= Bryan MacMahon =

Bryan MacMahon may refer to:

- Bryan MacMahon (writer) (1909–1998), Irish playwright, novelist and short story writer
- Bryan MacMahon (judge) (born 1941), Irish judge, son of above
