= St Michael's College, Listowel =

Boys' school in County Kerry, Ireland

Coordinates: 52.44749204°N 9.4762768°W

St. Michael's College
- Listowel, County Kerry; Ireland

Information
- Motto: Quis ut Deus (Latin: "Who is like unto God")
- Website: www.stmichaelscollege.ie

St Michael's College, is an all-boys secondary school serving the town of Listowel, and the greater north Kerry catchment area. The school is situated on the banks of the River Feale, and on the Cahirdown Road, Listowel.

== History ==
The school was founded by the Catholic Bishop of Kerry in 1879. The college was originally located in a town house in The Square, Listowel, but moved to the former fever hospital on the edge of the town, when that became available. With a student body of seventy mostly fee paying students, the college teachers were presided over by a president, who was a cleric up until 1989. Since, all principals/presidents have been lay persons. The school celebrated its centenary in 1979.

The school retains its original home, and the old building still holds classes, offices and laboratories. Two extension programs have taken place since 1983. The first included the addition of ten new classrooms, an assembly hall, offices, a new staffroom and science laboratories. In 2003, Taoiseach Bertie Ahern opened a new extension which contains a further five classrooms, woodwork and metalwork rooms and a chemistry demonstration room. Dressing rooms were added to the sports hall, and a new football pitch was inaugurated in 2009. In 2020 another extension was added which contained a new metalwork room and upgraded sports facilities. The sod was turned by Taoiseach Leo Varadkar

== Curriculum ==
The College runs a curriculum which follows a five-year cycle, with Junior Certificate for three years, and Leaving Certificate. Transition Year was introduced as an option in 2010.

== Sport ==
Apart from classes in Physical Education, sport it is not compulsory. The traditional college sport is Gaelic football. There is also a provision for athletics, badminton, hurling, soccer, rugby, golf and swimming. Teams are entered for school competitions. Other activities include debating, music, bridge, science and general knowledge quizzes, literary and maths competitions.

== Notable past pupils ==
- Gerard Barrett, writer, director and producer
- Jimmy Deenihan, Gaelic footballer, Teachta Dála, Minister for Arts, Heritage and Gaeltacht Affairs
- George Fitzmaurice, Abbey Theatre Playwright and author
- John B. Keane, poet, author, and playwright
- Edward Kissane (1886–1959), priest, scholar and president of St Patrick's College, Maynooth
- Bryan MacMahon, poet, author, playwright, and teacher
- Bryan MacMahon, Irish High Court judge
- Alfred O'Rahilly, academic, President of University College Cork and Teachta Dála (TD) for Cork City
- T. F. O'Rahilly, Celtic languages scholar
- Páidí Ó Sé, Gaelic Footballer and Kerry GAA manager
