= Tonaknock Cross =

- Crois Thóin an Chnoic (Irish)
- Killahan Cross
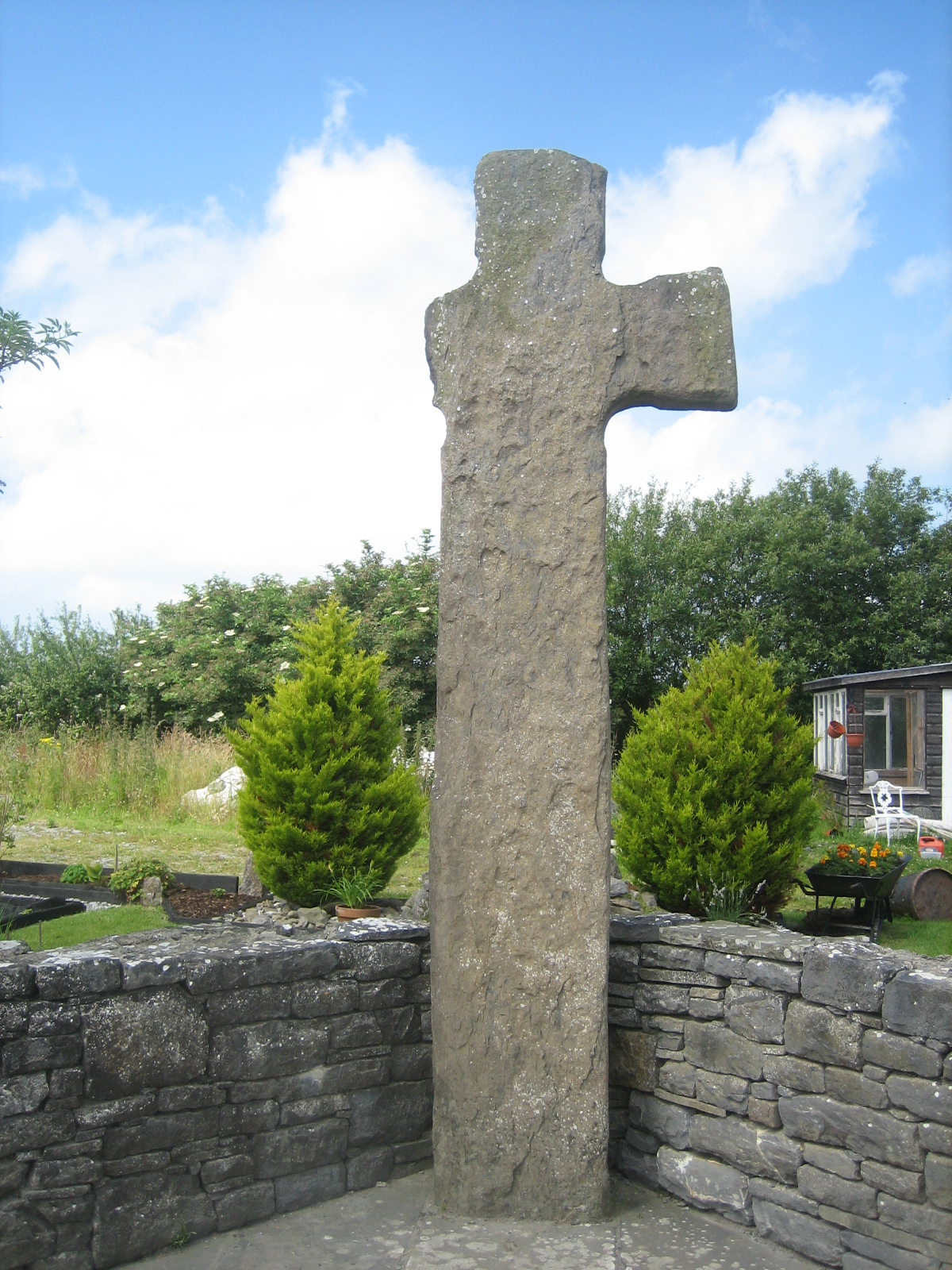

- Location within Ireland
- 52.383012°N 9.698287°W
- Type: high cross
- Location: Tonaknock, Abbeydorney, County Kerry, Ireland

History
- Built: c. 7th century AD

Designations
Designation
Designations
National monument of Ireland
- Official name: Tonaknock Cross
- Reference no.: 303

Tonaknock Cross is a high cross and National Monument located in County Kerry, Ireland.

== Location ==
Tonaknock Cross is located on the Ardfert–Lixnaw road.

== History ==
Tonaknock Abbey, a collegiate church of the Canons Regular, was established here in the 7th century; the cross was probably erected between then and the 9th century and represents an early stage in the development of the Irish high cross. Local legend says the south arm was broken by a cannonball during the 16th century Desmond Rebellions. It was found buried in a field and was re-erected.

== Description ==
The cross is 3.2 m (10 ft) high and only decoration seems to be small incised circles on the west head and face. It is believed to date from the 9th century.
