= Abbeydorney =

Village in County Kerry, Ireland

Abbeydorney Mainistir Ó dTorna
- Village
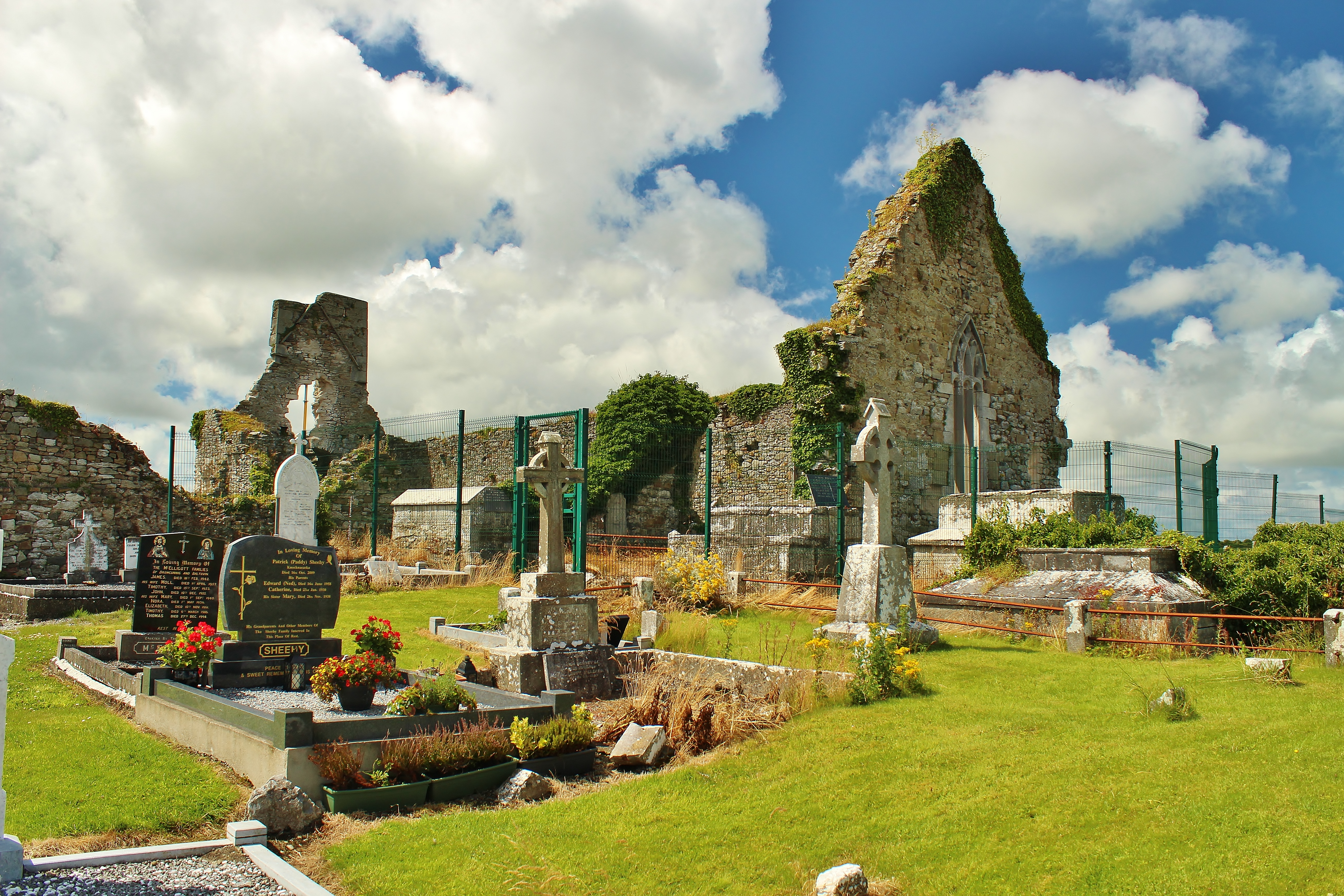
- Kyrie Eleison Abbey

- Location in Ireland
- Coordinates: 52°21′00″N 9°41′00″W
- Country: Ireland
- Province: Munster
- County: County Kerry
- Elevation: 72 m (236 ft)

Population (2016)
  - Total: 418
- Time zone: UTC+0 (WET)
  - Summer (DST): UTC-1 (IST (WEST))
- Irish Grid Reference: Q853233

Abbeydorney (Irish: Mainistir Ó dTorna, meaning 'monastery of the clan of Torna') is a village in County Kerry, Ireland. Located 9 kilometres (6 mi) north of the county town of Tralee, the village had a population of 418 as of the 2016 census of Ireland. Abbeydorney falls within the civil parish of O'Dorney, and is sometimes colloquially called by that name.

== History until 1900 ==
Bivallate and Multivallate ringforts in North Kerry and nearby Abbeydorney show that the area has been settled since the Bronze Age.

=== Abbey ===
The name of the village derives from the translation of the Irish Mainistir Ó dTorna – in English O'Dorney Abbey – which was the Cistercian Order Abbeydorney Abbey, established in 1154 and located north of the village. The abbey is often called Kyrie Eleison (which is Greek for Lord, have mercy). It was suppressed in 1537 during the reign of King Henry VIII of England.

=== Village ===
The village that developed around the abbey is of an agrarian nature and the institutions that have developed reflect this. In 1885, Abbeydorney GAA club was established, and in 1895 Abbeydorney Co-operative Dairy Society was formed. A courthouse for petty sessions was held fortnightly in Abbeydorney. The courthouse closed in 1919.

== History from 1900 ==
People from the village were involved in the Irish War of Independence and the Irish Civil War. Many also joined the Irish Volunteers.

=== War of Independence ===
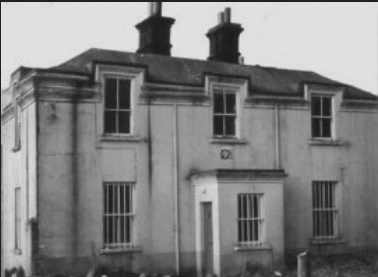
Abbeydorney RIC Barracks, demolished in 1981.

Abbeydorney was home to RIC barracks, which changed location at-least twice since the force was set up in the village.

On October 12, 1920, lorries of armed RIC men evacuated, robbed and torched the Abbeydorney Co-Operative Creamery. The manager of the creamery, Tim O'Donovan received a blow to the back of the head by a constable's rifle when he refused to give up the key to his safe.

On October 18, 1920, O'Donovan's house and that of his engine man, Patrick Tuomey was set alight by RIC constables in retaliation.

On November 25th, 1920 the burning of the creamery was brought up in the House of Commons, where Chief Secretary, Sir Hamar Greenwood said that, according to a report, the creamery was burned on October 12th but they did not know who had committed the destruction.

On October 31st, 1920 an RIC constable was shot dead in the village and another was seriously injured. The next day, people leaving mass were held up and searched. Most of the younger men had fled the village out of fear of being caught. That night, RIC Constables left the barracks with barrels of petrol and cordoned off all roads to the village. The houses of several people were burned:

- Eugene Moriarty, blacksmith
- Mrs Peggy Joe Lovett, publican
- John Lynn, building contractor
- Mike Whelan, shopkeeper
- Willie O'Rahilly, insurance agent
- Mrs. Griffin, music teacher (pleaded with raiders to allow her to preserve her furniture)
- Jeremiah O'Donovan, carpenter
- Mrs. Kearney had a hayshed on her farm burned down.

Many of these houses were rebuilt after the burning with financial aid from the American Committee for Relief in Ireland which was distributed by the Irish White Cross.

== Amenities ==
As of December 2023, Abbeydorney is home to a school, a community centre, two restaurants, a gym, a GAA Complex that also contains a pub, and a play-park. The village is also home to a doctor's practice and a physiotherapy clinic.

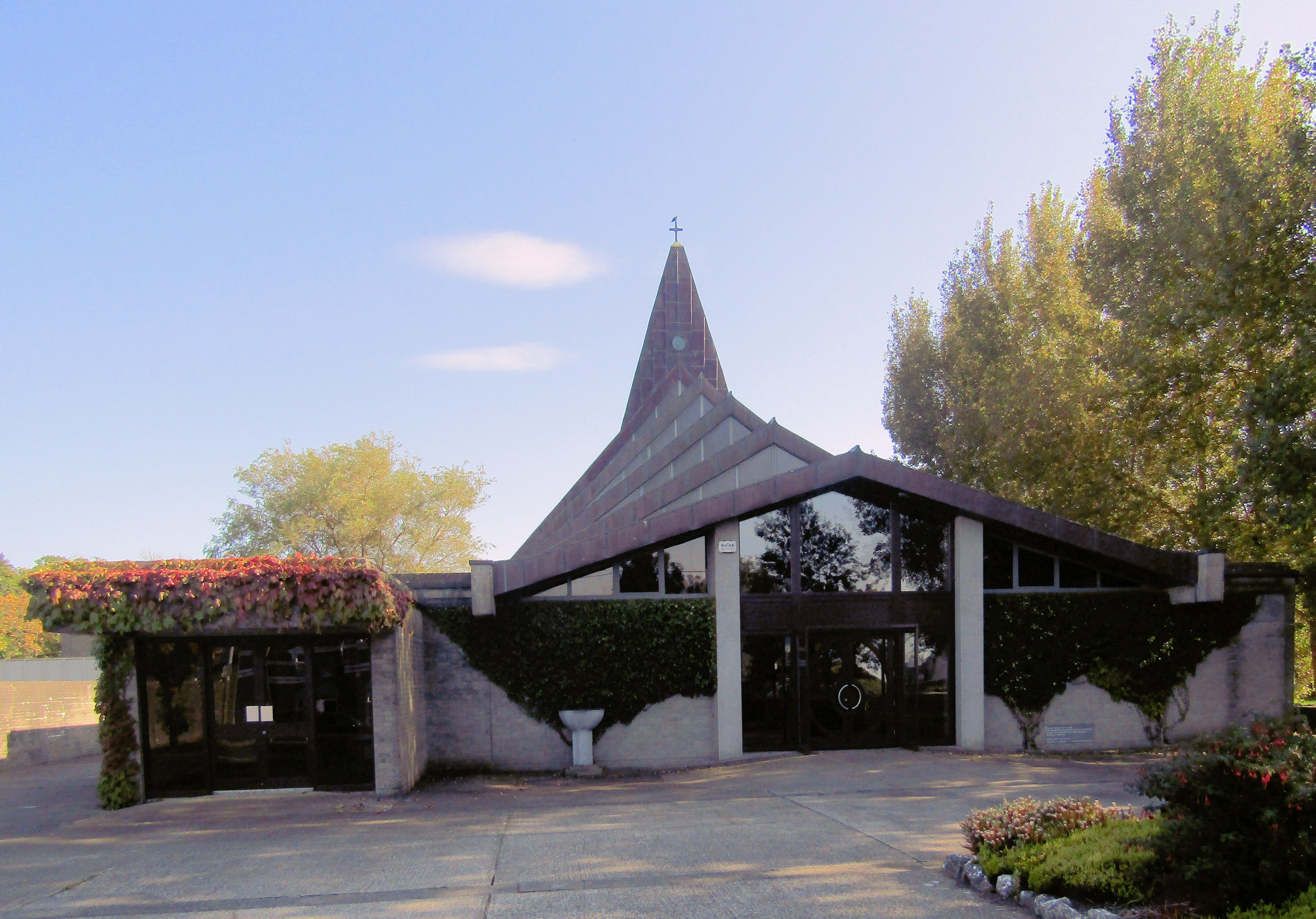
St. Bernard's Church, Abbeydorney

=== Church ===
St. Bernard's Church, a modern ecclesiastical Catholic church lies on the Bridge Road, next to the River Brick. It is built on the site of a former church which was demolished in 1966.

== Transport ==
=== Road ===
Abbeydorney is built around the junction of the R556 (between Tralee and Ballyduff), the R557 (from Abbeydorney to Listowel) and the L2002 Bridge Road, towards Ardfert, named for the former railway bridge it passes over.

The crossroads in Abbeydorney have long been a point of contingency, with buildings on the corner blocking sightlines or making it unclear that there is a junction ahead. In November of 2024, it was reported that there had been three incidents at the crossroads within the span of six weeks. In March of 2025, Kerry County Council revealed plans to carry out safety improvement works at the crossroads in order to prevent further accidents and to make the crossroads more pedestrian-friendly. The improvements, which had been carried out by September of 2026, included smart traffic lights, pedestrian crossings with a widened footpath and revised line markings.

Abbeydorney lies on the Bus Éireann 272 line, running from Tralee to Ballybunnion through Listowel. It stops in the village five times daily.

=== Rail ===
Abbeydorney railway station serving the village opened on 20 December 1880 on the line from Tralee to Limerick via Listowel. Passenger services were withdrawn on 4 February 1963, although the route through Abbeydorney continued to be used by freight trains for a while before the line to Listowel was finally closed altogether in 1977 and then to Tralee 1978. The station closed on 6 February 1978.

As part of the Great Southern Trail and the stretch of greenway proposed between Listowel and Tralee, the disused railway track running through Abbeydorney may be adapted into a greenway, connecting Abbeydorney to nearby towns and villages. Economic benefits provided by such greenways has been observed in other Irish villages such as nearby Fenit.

== Sport ==
=== Hurling ===
The local Abbeydorney hurling team have won five County Championships, the last in 2024, and in more recent times their minor teams have won the minor county championship in 1999 and again in 2008. Abbeydorney GAA is also one of the oldest teams in Kerry. It was founded in 1885

In 2024, Abbeydorney Hurling Team beat Ballyduff in the county final, qualifying to play Brickey Rangers GAA from Waterford in the AIB Munster Club Intermediate Hurling Championship Quarter-Final. They won this match by a point, but would lose their next match against Cashel King Cormacs from Tipperary.

=== Ladies Football ===
The Abbeydorney Ladies Football Club was the feeding ground for the great Kerry Ladies teams of the 1980s and 1990s. In more recent years they secured back-to-back All-Irelands. They won the Junior All-Ireland Club title in 2004 and followed that a year later in 2005 by winning the All-Ireland Intermediate Club title.

=== Camogie ===
Abbeydorney is home to an up-and-coming camogie team named Abbeykillix, serving the villages of Abbeydorney, Kilflynn and Lixnaw.

== Common surnames ==
According to Irish census of 1901 and 1911, common names in the area at the time included: Sullivan, Connor, Stack, Walsh, Shanahan, Buckley, Fitzgerald, Lawlor, Dowling, Glavin, McCarthy, Slattery, Brosnan, Hayes, Lynch, Moriarty, O'Connor, O'Leary, Lovett, Mahony, Maunsell, Murphy, Brennan, Cronin, Nolan, Sheehan, and Sheehy.

== Notable people ==
- Amelia Wilmot, member of Cumann na mBan and spy during the Irish War of Independence.

== See also ==
- List of towns and villages in Ireland
