= The Field (1990 film) =

1990 film by Jim Sheridan

- Theatrical release poster
- Directed by: Jim Sheridan
- Screenplay by: Jim Sheridan
- Based on: The Field by John B. Keane
- Produced by: Noel Pearson
- Starring: Richard Harris; John Hurt; Sean Bean; Brenda Fricker; Frances Tomelty; Tom Berenger
- Cinematography: Jack Conroy
- Edited by: J. Patrick Duffner
- Music by: Elmer Bernstein
- Production companies: Granada Television; Noel Pearson; Sovereign Pictures
- Distributed by: Avenue Pictures
- Release dates: 21 September 1990 (Republic of Ireland); 21 December 1990 (United States); 22 February 1991 (United Kingdom)
- Running time: 107 minutes
- Country: Ireland
- Language: English
- Budget: IR£5 million
- Box office: IR£1.6 million

The Field is a 1990 Irish drama film written and directed by Jim Sheridan and starring Richard Harris, John Hurt, Sean Bean, Brenda Fricker and Tom Berenger. It was adapted from John B. Keane's 1965 play of the same name. The film is set in the early 1930s and was shot almost entirely in the Connemara village of Leenaun. Harris received a Best Actor nomination for his role as Bull McCabe.

== Plot ==
Bull McCabe, an Irish farmer, dumps a dead donkey in a lake. It transpires that McCabe's son, Tadhg, killed the donkey after discovering it had broken into the field the family has rented for generations. The donkey's owner blames Bull McCabe for the death and demands "blood money".

McCabe has a deep attachment to the rented field, which his family has cultivated and improved, from barren to now very productive, over a number of generations. The field's owner is a widow who, around the time of the 10th anniversary of the death of her husband, decides to sell the field. She decides to sell the field by public auction rather than to McCabe directly. Unbeknownst to McCabe, Tadhg has been harassing the widow for years, causing her to believe that McCabe is behind the harassment in order to force her into a sale. On hearing there will be an auction McCabe goes to the village pub and announces that nobody would dare bid against him for "his" field.

McCabe has constant doubts about Tadhg's ability to safeguard the field. His older son, Seamie, died by suicide when he was 13. McCabe blames himself for the death, as he told Seamie the field could only support one family, and that Tadhg would have to emigrate when he grew up. McCabe and his wife have not spoken in the 18 years since the death.

Peter, an American whose ancestors are from the area, arrives in the village. He has plans to build a hydro-electric plant in the area and quarry stone for new roads. Central to his plans is McCabe's field. At the auction Peter repeatedly out-bids McCabe, forcing the price up to 80 pounds, 30 pounds more than what McCabe can afford. Seeing the bidding war the widow stops the auction and insists there would be a new auction, with a reserve price of 100 pounds. Knowing he cannot outbid Peter and seeing his cattle thrown off the field, McCabe goes to the rectory to confront Peter, and the parish priest who has been supporting him. McCabe now discovers Tadhg's actions, expelling him from the meeting, and goes on to explain his deep attachment to the field. This includes the death of his mother while saving hay.

Peter refuses to back down from his plans. In a desperate last attempt McCabe and Tadhg confront Peter at a waterfall he has just purchased, the night before the second auction. When Tadhg fails to defeat Peter in a fight, McCabe himself intervenes and beats both men in a rage. Peter is killed, and upon realising this, McCabe has a mental break. He confuses Peter with his dead son Seamie. Tadhg flees to the Irish Traveller woman he has fallen for. He tells her he has killed Peter, and they make plans to run off together. McCabe's acolyte Bird O'Donnell bids on behalf of McCabe and secures the field for 101 pounds at the second auction, unopposed.

A Traveller boy spots the dead donkey floating in the lake and a crane is brought in to recover it. It inadvertently recovers the corpse of Peter. At the same time Tadhg comes home to tell his father he is leaving with the Traveller and says he never wanted the field. The Parish priest arrives to confront McCabe about the discovery of Peter. Having lost his son and with the corpse discovered, McCabe goes insane and herds his cattle to the cliffs. Bird informs Tadhg that his father has gone mad. Tadhg rushes to stop his father but gets driven over the cliff by the herd of cattle and killed. Further maddened with grief, McCabe attempts to drive the waves back from his dead son, while Tadhg's mother and the Traveller sob on the clifftop.

== Cast ==
- Richard Harris as 'Bull' McCabe
- Sean Bean as Tadhg McCabe
- Tom Berenger as Peter - The 'Yank' American
- Frances Tomelty as Widow
- Brenda Fricker as Maggie McCabe
- John Hurt as 'The Bird' O'Donnell
- Ruth McCabe as Tinker Woman
- Jer O'Leary as Tinker Girl's Father
- Jenny Conroy as Katie - The Tinker Girl
- Joan Sheehy as 2nd Tinker Woman
- Sean McGinley as Father Chris Doran
- Malachy McCourt as Sergeant
- Frank McDonald as Quarryman
- Brendan Gleeson as Quarryman
- Tommy Walsh as standby extra

== Production ==
The screenplay went through several revisions from the early drafts; some of which were precipitated by changes to the cast. For example with the role going to Seán McGinley, the role of the town priest was expanded, and the character of William Dee, an English resident in the town, was replaced by a sympathetic Irish American man named Peter, who was portrayed by Tom Berenger.

The film was shot in counties Galway and Mayo.

== Reception ==
=== Box Office ===
The film made £1,168,613 in the UK.

=== Critical response ===
On Rotten Tomatoes, the film has an approval rating of 43% based on reviews from 14 critics.

Roger Ebert of the Chicago Sun-Times wrote: "The Field is a grim allegory of hard life on the land -- a symbolic play, transplanted uneasily to the greater realism of the film medium, where what we might accept on the stage now looks contrived and artificial." Vincent Canby of The New York Times wrote: "The Field is a movie that all too often reveals its origins as a play." Rita Kempley of The Washington Post wrote: "Sheridan seems out in left field here, undone by the sheer hokum of the material."

=== Awards and nominations ===
Award	Category	Nominee(s)	Result
Academy Awards	Best Actor	Richard Harris	Nominated
British Academy Film Awards	Best Actor in a Supporting Role	John Hurt	Nominated
Dallas–Fort Worth Film Critics Association Awards	Best Actor	Richard Harris	Nominated
Golden Globe Awards	Best Actor in a Motion Picture – Drama	Richard Harris	Nominated

=== Legacy ===
In 1996, An Post, the Irish Post Office, issued a set of postage stamps to commemorate the centenary of Irish cinema; the 32p stamp featured an image from The Field of actors Harris, Bean, and Hurt standing against the backdrop of Killary Harbour.

== Notes ==
- "John B Keane". doolee.com. Retrieved 17 March 2007.
