= R557 road =

R557 road may refer to:

- R557 road (Ireland)
- R557 road (South Africa)
