= Charles Wilmot =

Charles Wilmot may refer to:

- Charles Wilmot, 1st Viscount Wilmot (c. 1572–1644), English soldier active in Ireland
- Charles Wilmot, 3rd Earl of Rochester (1670/71 – 1681), British peer
