= Sive (play) =

1959 play by John B. Keane

- Written by: John B. Keane
- Characters: Liam Scuab; Mike Glavin; Mena Glavin; Carthalawn; Nanna Glavin; Thomasheen Seán Rua; Sive; Pats Bocock; Seán Dóta
- Original language: English
- Subject: Illegitimacy, marriage, poverty
- Genre: Tragedy, drama
- Setting: Rural County Kerry, 1960s

Premiere
- Date premiered: March 1959
- Place premiered: Walsh's Ballroom, Listowel, Ireland

Sive /ˈsaɪv/ is a play by the Irish writer John B. Keane, first performed in Listowel, County Kerry in 1959. Keane chose to use the name "Sive" for the play in honour of his sister, Shiela, using the Irish Gaelic form of the name.

The play is set in rural Ireland where a set of attitudes about the battle between the generations (the young orphan Sive takes her own life rather than marrying an old man). Poverty, exploitation, marriage, greed, and love are explored.

== Performance history ==
After it was rejected by the Abbey Theatre, The Listowel Drama Group produced the play. Sive was first performed in Christy's Ballroom, Listowel, County Kerry. The play was an overall success, but John B. Keane noted that some took offence to the melodramatic content of the play, calling it blasphemous and pornographic based on the appearance of Sive as a young girl.

In the first performances of the play, Nora Relihan played Mena Glavin, Margaret Dillon performed as Sive, and John B. Keane himself played Carthalawn.

The play is widely known throughout Ireland, and has been taught in the Irish school system.

== Plot ==
=== Act I ===
==== Scene I ====
The play opens in a rural kitchen in the south of Ireland during the 1950s. Nanna and Mena are engaged in an argument; Nanna criticises the unfavourable arrangement that occurred when Mena married her son, Mike. Sive returns home, and Mena reveals her resentment towards her because, at eighteen years old, Sive still attends school and does not contribute to the household. Sive’s relatives are absent—her father has left, and her mother is deceased. Meanwhile, the local matchmaker Thomasheen Seán Rua approaches Mena with a proposal that Sive be married to Seán Dóta, a wealthy elderly bachelor, offering the family a substantial sum of money. Mike expresses disapproval of the proposal. The scene is interrupted by the secret arrival of Liam Scuab, Sive’s suitor.

==== Scene II ====
Thomasheen introduces Seán Dóta to the household. Dóta initially appears timid and performs a song, but his behaviour becomes inappropriate and assertive when he asks Sive to accompany him to his cottage. Mike voices moral objections to the proposed marriage, which Thomasheen dismisses, asserting that people of their class lack understanding of love. Thomasheen recounts a personal story about his father’s suicide and explains how financial hardship prevented him from affording a funeral and a subsequent wedding, using this narrative to manipulate Mike’s anxieties about Liam.

==== Scene III ====
Two itinerant men, Pats and Carthalawn, visit and provide contrast between Nanna’s warm hospitality and the less generous attitudes of Mena and Thomasheen, who refuse their requests for food and money. The men perform a satirical song that conveys their sadness. Later, Mena explains to Sive the necessity of the proposed marriage, expressing frustration as poverty and desperation compel her support for the arrangement.

=== Act II ===
==== Scene I ====
Upon learning of the impending marriage, Liam attempts to visit Sive but is intercepted by Mike and Mena. Mena informs Sive that Liam is content with the wedding plans. Mike experiences a moral dilemma concerning the situation.

==== Scene II ====
Pats confides in Nanna about the shame associated with arranging a secret marriage between Sive and Liam. Mike discovers a letter outlining the marriage plan but mistakes it for a love letter. Thomasheen seizes the letter and burns it. Sive and Mena return from a day spent on wedding preparations while the men drink. During a subsequent visit by Pats and Carhalawn, Mena realises that Sive is missing. Liam enters carrying Sive’s lifeless body; she has drowned in the bog. Mike expresses concern for the family’s reputation, Mena reacts with hysteria, and Nanna remains by Sive’s side in silence.
