= R557 road (Ireland) =

Regional road in Ireland

Coordinates: 52.369838°N 9.636734°W

R557 road
- Bóthar R557

Route information
- Length: 17.0 km (10.6 mi)

Major junctions
- From: R556 Abbeydorney
- Passes through Lixnaw
- To: N69 Listowel (Coolnaleen Cross Roads)

Location
- Country: Ireland

Highway system
- Roads in Ireland; Motorways; Primary; Secondary; Regional

The R557 road is a regional road in Ireland, located in County Kerry.
