= Listowel Castle =

Castle in County Kerry, Ireland

Coordinates: 52°26′43″N 9°29′09″W

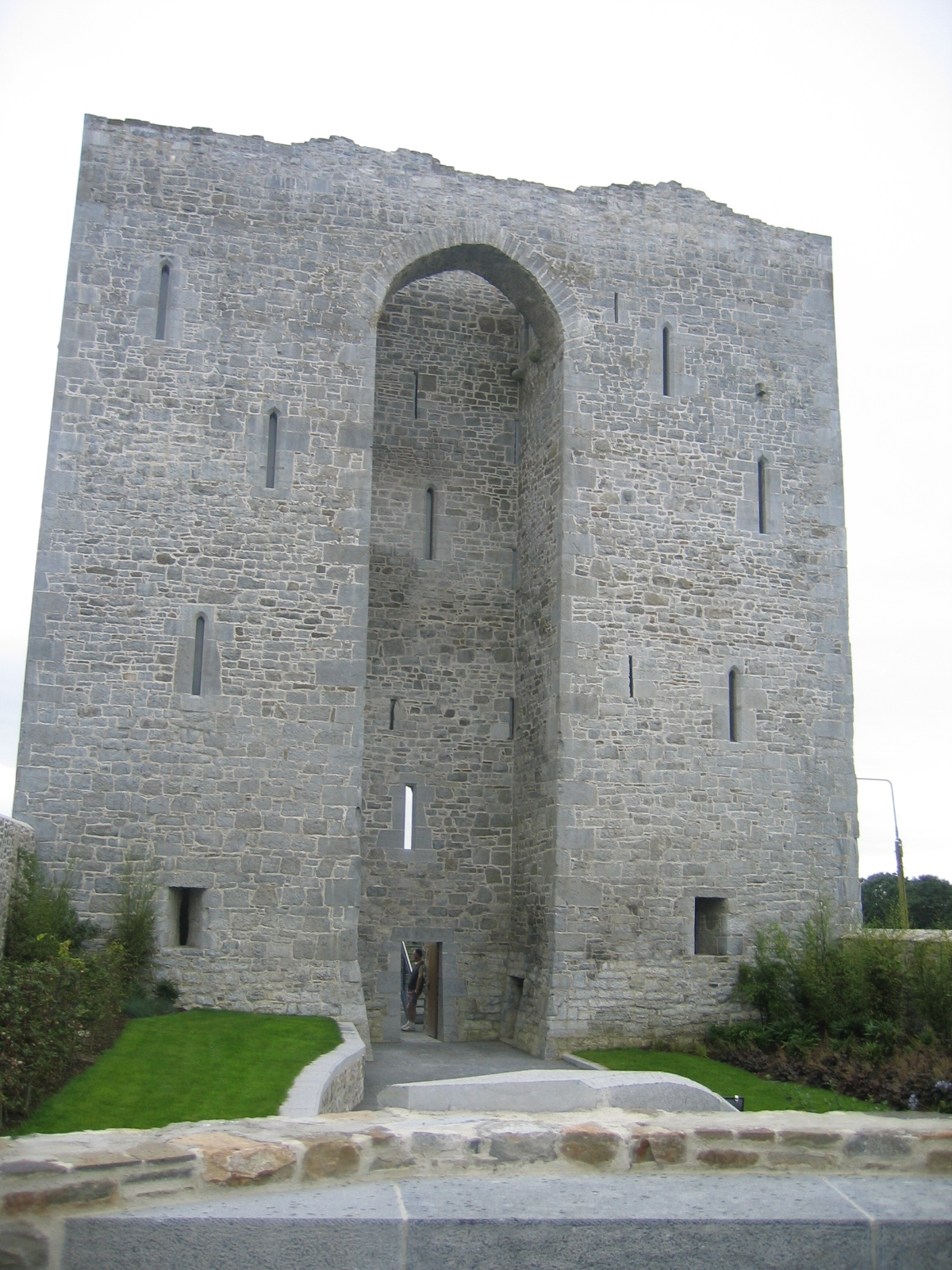
Listowel Castle

Listowel Castle, located near the town of Listowel, County Kerry in Ireland, was built in the 15th century. The castle is a noted example of Anglo-Norman architecture in County Kerry, and has been the subject of several restoration projects. It is now protected as a national monument, and is open to the public for tours on a daily basis.

== History ==
Built in the 15th century, Listowel Castle was the last bastion against Queen Elizabeth I in the First Desmond Rebellion, and was the last fortress of the Geraldines to be subdued. It fell, after 28 days siege, to Sir Charles Wilmot on 5 November 1568; he had the castle's garrison executed in the following days. Another Anglo-Norman castle at Woodford, Listowel, was built in the post-1600 period by the Knight of Kerry.

The castle became the property of the Hare family, the holders of the title of Earl of Listowel, after reverting away from the Fitzmaurices, Knights of Kerry.

In 2005, restoration works were commenced by the Office of Public Works. The stonework has been cleaned by a team of craftsmen, while the upper section, which had become particularly distressed with the passing of time, was restored and rendered waterproof. An external staircase, in keeping with the architecture of the structure, was erected to enable the public to access the upper stories.

== Structure ==
The remaining remnants of the castle include two of its original four towers, which are joined by a heavy curtain wall, and the unusual feature of an arch below the battlements. Archaeological excavations and records of the castle reveal that it was originally of similar form to Bunratty Castle, County Clare.

The Seanchaí Literary Centre, which is located in a Georgian town house, includes displays on the castle's history.

== Sources ==
- Heritage Ireland: Listowel Castle
