= Amelia Wilmot =

Irish revolutionary and spy

- Born: Amelia Canty; 1874; Lyracrumpane, Listowel, County Kerry
- Died: 1955 (aged 80–81); United Kingdom
- Notable work: revolutionary and spy

Amelia Wilmot (1874–1955), was a revolutionary and spy during the Irish War of Independence. She was a member of Cumann na mBan in County Kerry

== Biography ==
=== Early life ===
Amelia Canty was born in 1874 to John Canty, a blacksmith, in Lyracrumpane, near Listowel, County Kerry. She gained a basic education locally and lived at home until marriage.

In 1905 Canty married John Wilmot, originally from Knocknagoshel, County Kerry, then a Private in the 8th Hussars, in Aldershot in the United Kingdom. The couple had four children, though only the first was born outside Kerry. They returned to Kerry sometime before 1908. John Wilmot worked as a driver at a hotel in Castleisland for a few years before returning to the army for a year. He was called up in 1914 when the First World War began. Amelia Wilmot worked locally to supplement the small income her husband's service provided. She worked as a cook and housekeeper for the Royal Irish Constabulary in their Abbeydorney Barracks.

=== War of Independence ===
Wilmot was working in the barracks by 1916. When the war of Independence began in 1919 she began working for the North Kerry Flying Column supplying information on troop movements as well as smuggling arms and ammunition out of the barracks. She also provided information on what the RIC knew about the enemy's movements and plans for arrests. In January 1921 she went to work in the Listowel RIC Barracks and continued her subversive activities. This however brought her under suspicion and she was in danger. As a result, the local Flying column leader Denis Quille sent a letter to her threatening her unless she left "Listowel Barracks at once". The threat was taken seriously enough that Wilmot was provided with an armed escort to and from work by the RIC. Wilmot continued to provide arms and information until September 1921 when she was finally dismissed. Patrick McElligott, Comandant of the IRA, said that the local revolutionaries could not have continued their work without her information.

=== Life after the war ===
John Wilmot appears to have abandoned his family leaving his wife to raise the four children. She returned to working as a cook and housekeeper for the local police after the creation of the Irish Free State. When Wilmot could no longer work due to ill health she applied for and received a pension from the Irish State for her work during the war. Her daughter Julia had moved to the UK and in 1955 Wilmot died while living with her.
