= Teampaillin Bán =

Famine graveyard in County Kerry, Ireland

Coordinates: 52°27′04″N 9°29′50″W

An Teampall Bán more commonly known by its diminutive name Teampaillin Bán is a famine graveyard located off the Ballybunion road in Listowel, County Kerry. It is the burial ground of over 2,641 victims who died between February 1850 and March 1852 during the Great Famine.

== History ==
The Listowel Workhouse was filled with many destitute people who died every day from starvation and disease during the Great Famine. Between 2,500 and 3,500 people died in the Listowel workhouse during this period. As a result, a new burial ground was required to bury the high numbers of deceased inmates. The Poor Relief Extension Act permitted that any land which was detached from the workhouse grounds could be rented or purchased, and used as a cemetery for the deceased inmates of the workhouse. The Board of Guardians had the jurisdiction to rent and purchase land. On 26 December 1849, the Board of Guardians of the Listowel Workhouse agreed to purchase land for a cemetery of no more than three acres. In January 1850, the Guardians bought one acre of land from Lord Listowel’s tenant William Sandes of Greenville. As a result, the new burial ground which was called Teampaillin Bán replaced the Gale graveyard as the main burial site for the deceased inmates of the Listowel workhouse in February 1850.

== Listowel Workhouse ==
According to local folklore, Teampaillin Bán was the paupers’ burial ground. It was called the paupers’ graveyard because the term pauper was an epithet for the workhouse inmates. After the last rites were given to paupers in the workhouse, the bodies were transported to Teampaillin Bán by a horse and cart also known as the ‘Dead Car’ in folkloric tales. Burials were conducted every morning before 8 am and graves were dug at six feet deep. The relatives of deceased inmates had one or two days to claim the dead body before it was buried in an unmarked grave. The bodies were buried in mass pits rather than in individual graves to avoid the spread of disease as many feared that the dead bodies were contagious. Although most victims of the Great Famine were buried in unmarked graves, there were efforts made to bury some inmates in coffins. Coffins were made inside the gate of the workhouse and they had no mountings. Teampaillin Bán continued to be used as a burial ground until the 1940s. Therefore, some of the graves in Teampaillin Bán are marked with cut-stone gave markers. In 1944, the first standing monument in the graveyard was erected for James Baker. Between 1850 and 1940, a total of 3,500 people were buried at Teampaillin Bán.

== Funding and renovations ==
Before the late 1970s, Teampaillin Bán was inaccessible to visitors because it was overgrown with bushes, shrubs and brickwork. As a result, the chairman of Listowel’s Urban Council, Albert Kennedy, proposed the idea of renovating Teampaillin Bán to the council in 1975. In June 1977, the Urban District Council spent £2,100 on renovating the graveyard. A new pathway was built connecting the Ballybunion road to the graveyard, two plaques were designed by sculptor David Enright to mark the entryway of Teampaillin Bán and a new fence was built to protect the graveyard from vandalism and wandering cattle. An oratory was also built so that local people and visitors could pay their respects to the dead. Local community members such as the town’s engineer Bill Walsh and local charities such as FÁS helped with the renovations. On 30 October 1977, The Listowel Youth Club assisted the Teampaillian Bán Committee with the local church collection for the Teampaillin Bán restoration fund. In 1995, Teampaillin Bán was one of sixteen famine graveyards in Ireland to receive a grant of £1,000 from the Famine Commemoration Committee. The grant was given to Listowel County Council to cover the refurbishment costs of the graveyard in preparation for the 150th-anniversary of the Great Famine. Some of the refurbishments included improvements made to the paths and the Stations of the Cross in the oratory were also painted. In 1995, Teampaillin Bán was featured in The Great Famine, a BBC documentary that analysed the impact of the Great Famine on Ireland.
