= St. Bernard's Church Abbeydorney =

Church in Abbeydorney, County Kerry, Ireland

Coordinates: 52.3460°N 9.6882°W

St. Bernard's Church is a Roman Catholic church in Abbeydorney, Co. Kerry, Ireland. The building is a Modern Ecclesiastical work by Tralee-born architect Daniel J. Kennedy. It is on Kerry County Council's record of protected structures.

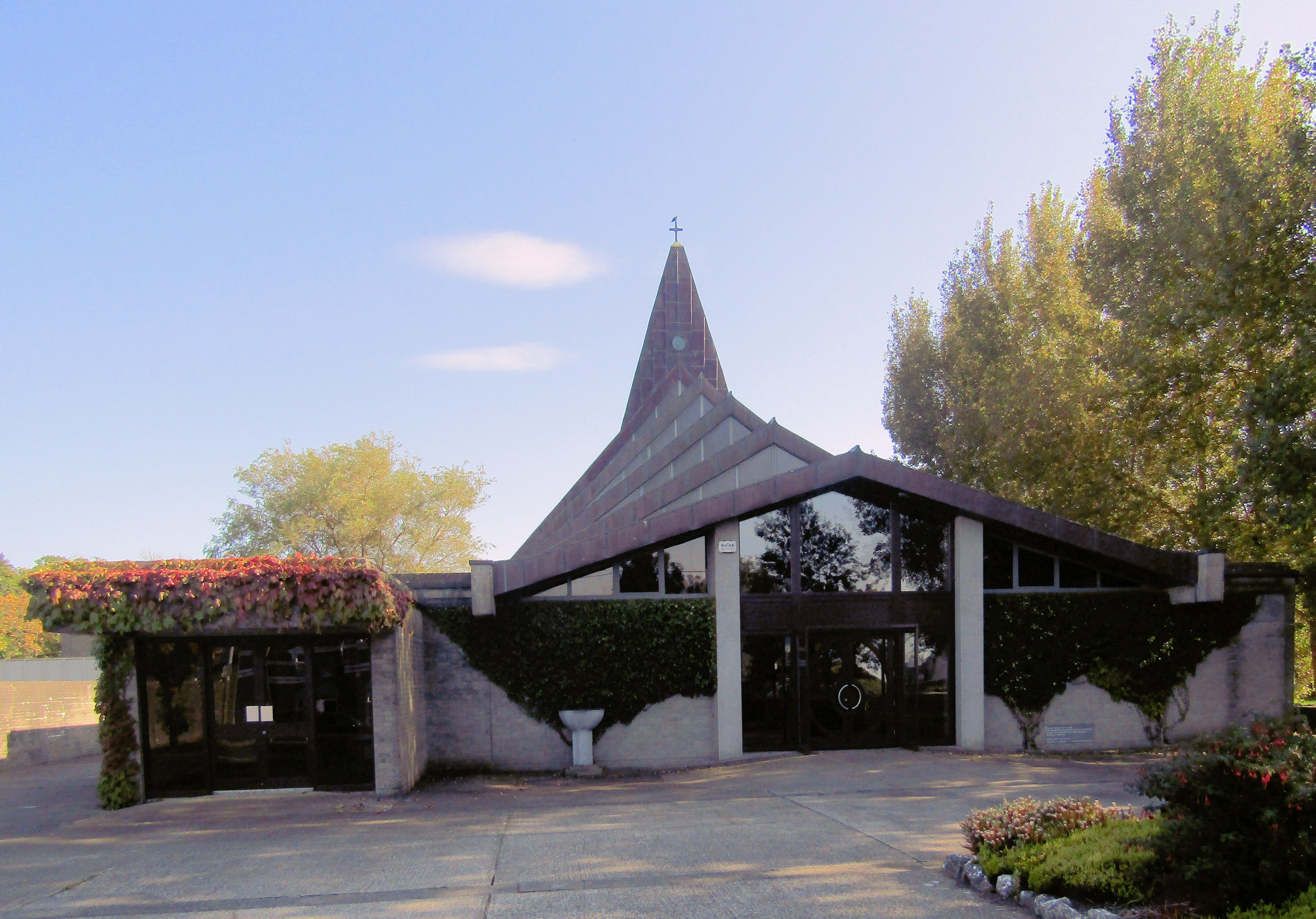
The church in September 2023

== Location ==
St. Bernard's is located on the Abbeydorney-Ardfert road, but the back entrance connects to the R556 and is the site of a former schoolhouse, according to a plaque. The church belongs to the parish of Abbeydorney-Kilflynn.

To the west of the church lies the River Brick and The Pens park.

== History ==
St. Bernard's was built on the site of an older church of the same name which was demolished in 1966, and stood for 150 years prior. Daniel J. Kennedy was commissioned to design a modern church for the village.

The church was completed in June 1968, and cost IR£80,000. It was built by Fitzgerald Bros. Only one antique is featured, which is the Gothic Revival organ from 1880. It was restored in 1997 and is still in use today. It came from St. Joseph's Convent on Portland Row in Dublin.

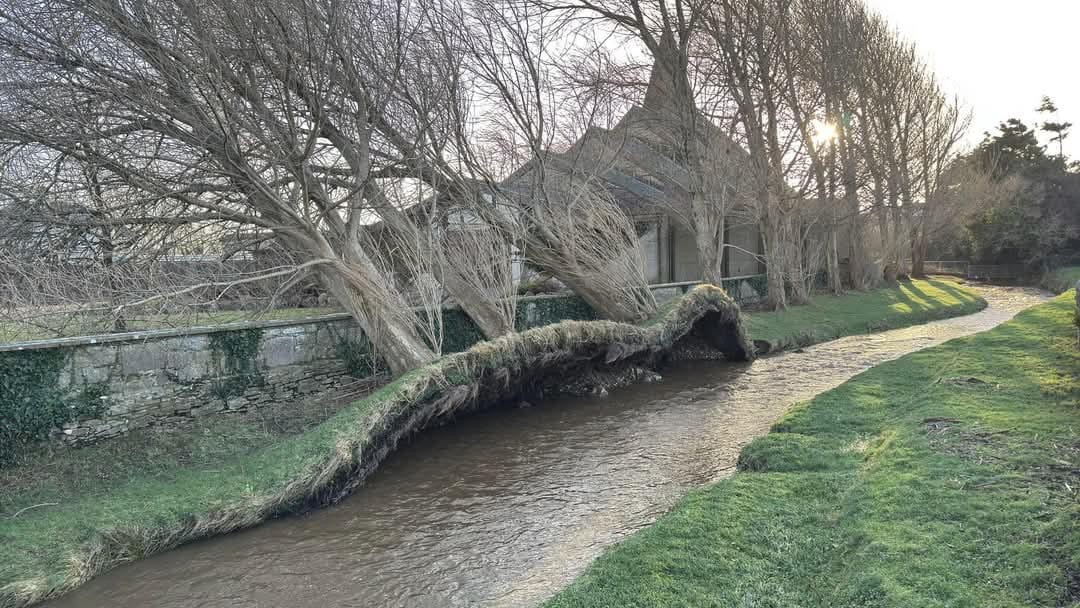
The side of the church in January 2025, following Storm Éowyn.

In 2025, during Storm Éowyn a treeline along the River Brick was uprooted, causing damage to a plaque and a memorial in the church yard.

== Architecture ==
The church is built on flat land. The walls are made of concrete brick and bands. The roof is made of five pitched overlapping copper-sheeted roofs rising towards the chancel, with a copper spire topping the highest section. The timber-and-steel roof is carried on reinforced concrete frames and concentrates light on the altar. A back entrance exists, both for accessibility and for vehicles such as hearses to drive to the front.

A grass lawn decorates the West side of the church, along the River Brick.
