= The Field (play) =

1965 play by John B. Keane

- Original language: English
- Written by: John B. Keane
- Characters: "Bull" McCabe; Tadhg McCabe; William Dee; Mick Flanagan; Maggie Butler; Maimie Flanagan "Bird" O'Donnell; Sergeant Leahy; Father Murphy; Leamy Flanagan; Dandy McCabe; Mrs. McCabe; The Bishop
- Genre: Rural drama
- Setting: Carraigthomond, A small village in southwest Ireland, early 1960s

Premiere
- Date: 1965
- Place: Olympia Theatre, Dublin

The Field is a play written by John B. Keane, first performed in 1965. It tells the story of the hardened Irish farmer "Bull" McCabe and his love for the land he rents. The play debuted at Dublin's Olympia Theatre in 1965, with Ray McAnally as "The Bull" and Eamon Keane as "The Bird" O'Donnell. The play was published in 1966 by Mercier Press. A new version with some changes was produced in 1987.

A film adaptation was released in 1990, directed by Jim Sheridan with Richard Harris in the lead role.

John B. Keane based the story on the 1958 murder of Moss Moore, a bachelor farmer living in Reamore, County Kerry. Dan Foley, a neighbour with whom Moore had a long-running dispute, was suspected of the murder, but the charges were denied by Foley's family. The character of William Dee, who has been living in England for many years, may be based on the nephew of William Dee (also called William Dee) who had been born in England in 1959. William Dee senior lived in the nearby village of Lisselton and was a friend and customer of JBK and so JBK would have been familiar with the emigration in the late 1950s to England of William Dee's brother Micheál and the birth of his son William there. The return of the character William Dee from England to Ireland in the play may therefore have been inspired by the possibility that the real William Dee might one day "come home" to the land of his parents.

== Plot ==
The Field is set in a small country village named Carraigthomond in southwest Ireland.

Rugged individualist Bull McCabe has spent five hard years of labour cultivating a small plot of rented land, nurturing it from barren rock into a fertile field. When the owner of the field decides to auction it, he believes that he has a claim to the land. The McCabes intimidate most of the townspeople out of bidding in the auction, to the chagrin of auctioneer Mick Flanagan, but Galwayman William Dee arrives from England, where he has lived for many years, with a plan to cover the field with concrete and extract gravel from the adjacent river. An encounter between William and the McCabes ends in William's death and a cover-up.

== Characters ==
- Thady "The Bull" McCabe - The play's main character and anti-hero, Bull is as strong as a cow - and just as powerful. Having grazed and rented Maggie Butler's field for five years, along with his son Tadhg, Bull believes he is the rightful owner.
- Tadhg McCabe - Bull's son and faithful companion, who too shares his father's passion of land.
- " The Bird" O'Donnell - A mischievous calf buyer and a regular at Flanagan's pub, Bird is an acquaintance of The McCabes.' Con Man.
- Mick Flanagan - The local publican and auctioneer, Mick is mendacious and sly and is another acquaintance of the McCabes, who attempts to help them secure the field.
- Maimie Flanagan - Mick's younger wife and the mother of his nine children. Maimie is flirtatious and charming and has a bitter, strained relationship with her husband, whilst maintaining a strong relationship with her eldest son Leamy.
- Maggie Butler - An elderly widow, who has rented her late husband's field to The McCabes for the past five years. Maggie is frail and destitute and wishes to put the field up for public auction, much to the McCabes' disgust.
- William Dee - A young Galway man, who has been living in England for twelve years. Considered an "outsider", William decides to bid against the Bull McCabe for Maggie Butler's field.
- Leamy Flanagan - Mick and Maimie's eldest son.
- Dandy McCabe - The Bull McCabe's first cousin, who, unlike Bull, is honest and jovial.
- Mrs. McCabe - Dandy's wife, to whom he has been married for twenty years.
- Tom Leahy - The local sergeant, investigating the death of a donkey.
- Fr Murphy - The local parish priest.

== Film version ==
Jim Sheridan directed a film version in 1990. Richard Harris received an Academy Award nomination for his portrayal.

Some characters in the film differed from the play but the film retained notable key characters, such as The Bull, The Bird, Tadhg, Mick Flanagan and the parish priest. Some events in the play were also changed in the film.
