= John B. Keane =

Irish playwright, novelist and essayist

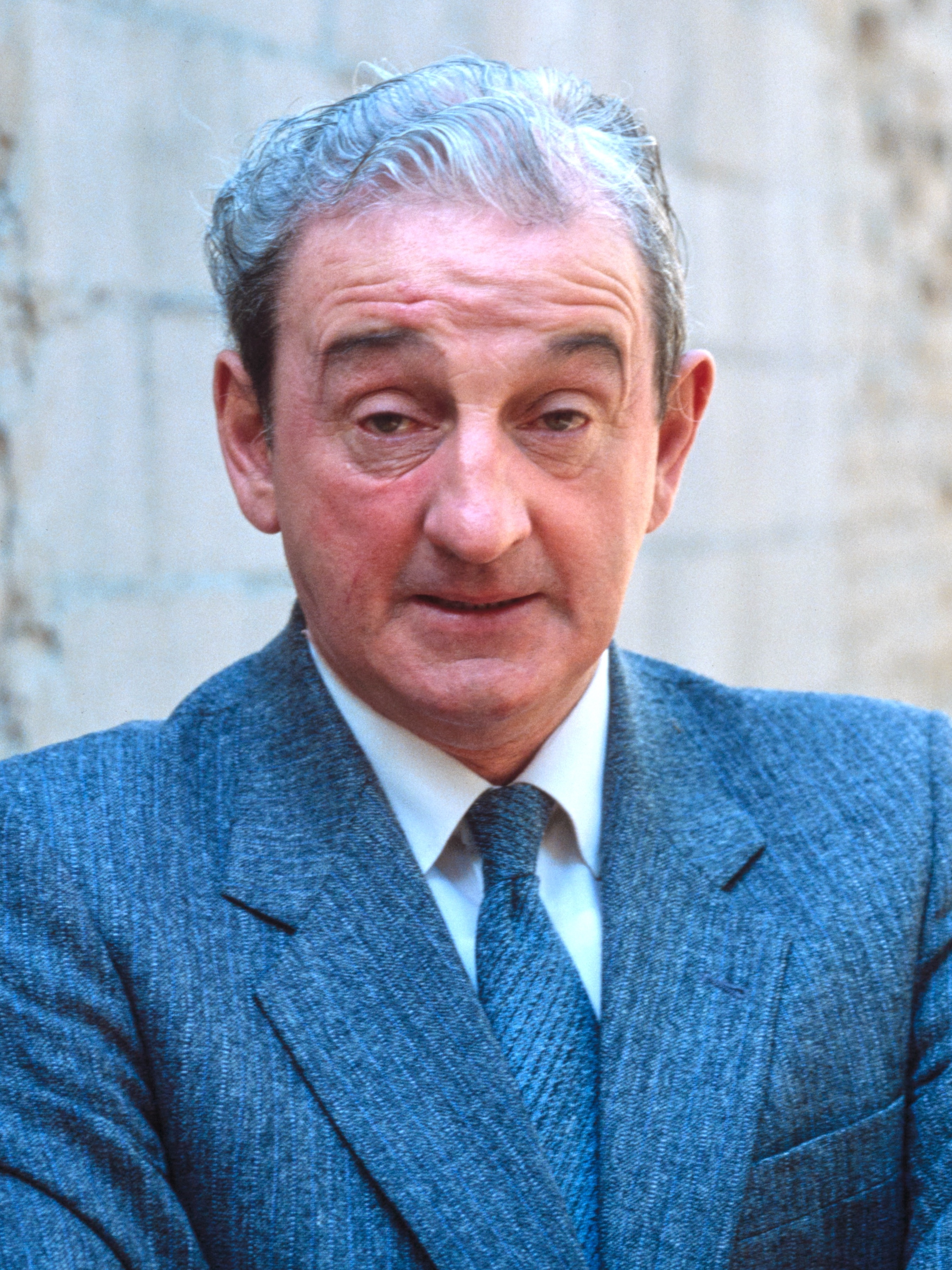
- Keane in 1983
- Born: John Brendan Keane; 21 July 1928; Listowel, County Kerry, Ireland
- Died: 30 May 2002 (aged 73); Listowel, County Kerry, Ireland
- Education: St Michael's College, Listowel
- Spouse: Mary O'Connor (m. 1960)
- Children: Billy; Conor; John; Joanna
- Writing career
- Notable works: The Field, Sive
- Notable awards: Honorary Life Member of the Royal Dublin Society

John Brendan Keane (21 July 1928 – 30 May 2002) was an Irish playwright, novelist and essayist from Listowel, County Kerry.

== Biography ==
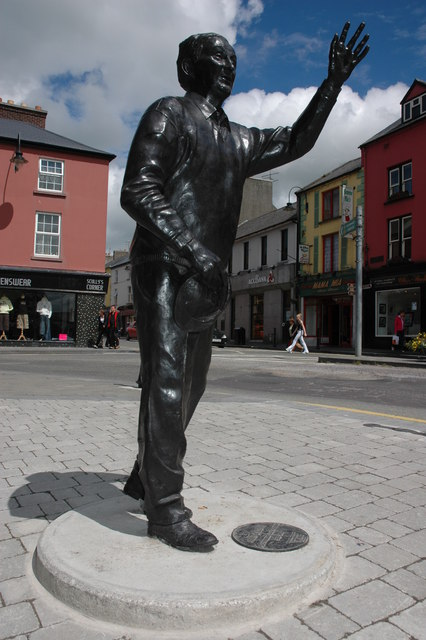
Statue of John B. Keane in Listowel, County Kerry.

A son of a national school teacher, William B. Keane, and his wife Hannah (née Purtill), Keane was educated at Listowel National School and then at St Michael's College, Listowel. He worked as a chemist's assistant for A. H. Jones who dabbled in buying antiques. Keane had various jobs in the UK between 1951 and 1955 working as a street cleaner, and a bar man, living in a variety of places including Northampton and London. It was while he was in Northampton that Keane was first published in an unnamed women's magazine for which he received £15.

After returning to Ireland from the United Kingdom, he became a pub owner in Listowel from 1955.

He married Mary O'Connor at Knocknagoshel Church on 5 January 1955 and had four children: Billy, Conor, John and Joanna.

He was an Honorary Life Member of the Royal Dublin Society from 1991, served as president of Irish PEN and was a founder member of the Society of Irish Playwrights as well as a member of Aosdána. Keane was named the patron of the Listowel Players after the Listowel Drama Group fractured. He remained a prominent member of the Fine Gael party throughout his life, never being shy of political debate.

His nephew is the investigative journalist Fergal Keane. His son John is a journalist with the Kilkenny People while his son, Billy regularly writes a column for the Irish Independent.

== Influences ==
Keane cited many literary influences including Bryan MacMahon and George Fitzmaurice, fellow Kerry writers and playwrights.

His personal influences were numerous but, most notably he thanked his father and his wife, Mary. Keane was grateful for his father's help with early editing, for allowing him access to his personal library, and for encouraging him to continue his work until he was successful.

He was also influenced by the local population and the patrons of his pub, on whom he based some of his characters.

== Awards and honours ==
- 1999 Irish PEN Award

== List of works ==
- Sive (1959)
- Many Young Men of Twenty (1961)
- Sharon's Grave (1960)
- The Highest House on the Mountain (1961)
- The Man From Clare (1962)
- The Year of the Hiker (1963)
- The Field (1965)
- Hut 42 (1968)
- The Rain at the End of the Summer (1968)
- Big Maggie (1969)
- Moll (1971)
- Letters of an Irish Parish Priest (1972)
- The One-Way Ticket (1972)
- Values (1973)
- The Crazy Wall (1973)
- The Change in Mame Fadden (1973)
- Letters of a Matchmaker (1975)
- Letters of a Country Postman (1977)
- Letters of an Irish Publican (1977)
- The Buds of Ballybunion (1979)
- The Chastitute (1981)
- Man of the Triple Name (1984)
- Owl Sandwiches (1985)
- The Bodhran Makers (1986)
- The Contractors (1988)
- The Ram of God and Other Stories (1992)
- Durango: A Novel (1992)
- A Warm Bed on a Cold Night and Other Stories (1997)
- The Teapots Are Out and other Eccentric Tales from Ireland (1997)
- Faoiseamh
- Pishogue
- No More in Dust
