= Lixnaw =

Village in County Kerry, Ireland

Lixnaw Irish: Leic Snámha
- Village
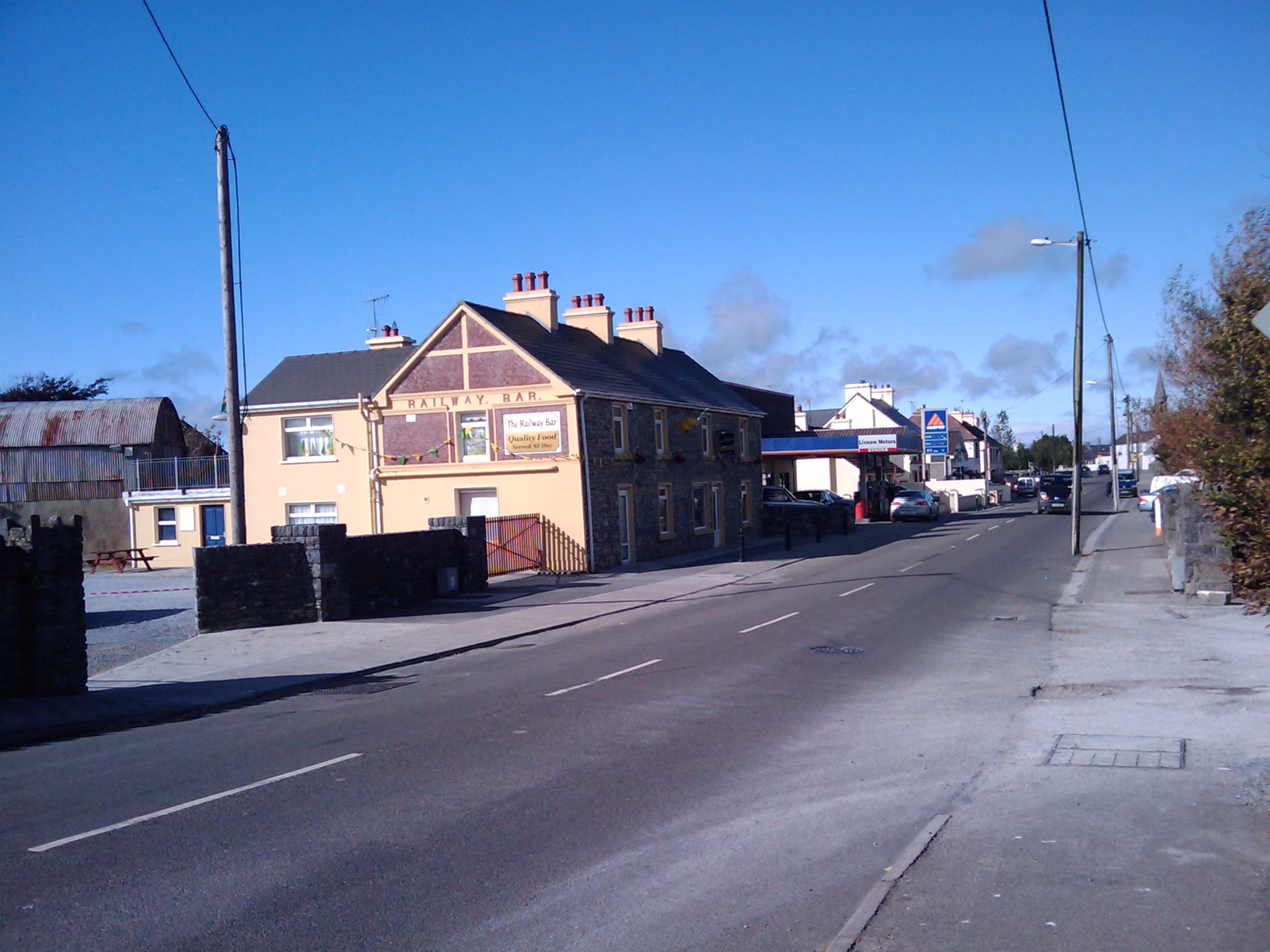
- Pub and petrol station in Lixnaw

- Location in Ireland
- Coordinates: 52°24′07″N 9°36′58″W
- Country: Ireland
- Province: Munster
- County: County Kerry

Population (2022)
  - Total: 758
- Time zone: UTC+0 (WET)
  - Summer (DST): UTC-1 (IST (WEST))

Lixnaw (Irish: Leic Snámha, meaning 'swimming flagstone') is a village in the north of County Kerry, Ireland. It is near the River Brick, 10 km (6 mi) southwest of Listowel and 16 km (10 mi) northeast of Tralee.

== History ==
Lixnaw was once the seat of the Fitzmaurice family, the Earls of Kerry. In 1320 Nicolas, the third baron of Lixnaw erected the Castle of Lixnaw, built the old bridge, and improved the village. In 1600, Charles Wilmot and his forces garrisoned the castle and established it as their centre of operations. It was subsequently retaken by Lord Kerry who entrusted its defence to his brother Gerald, who was eventually forced to surrender the castle due to a shortage of water. Today, nothing remains of the Castle of Lixnaw. An interesting point about the Earls of Kerry is that one of the descendants William Petty, 2nd Earl of Shelburne, who was born in Dublin but was largely reared in Lixnaw (except when he was in Eton), became British Prime Minister in 1782.

== Places of interest ==
=== Korean War Memorial ===
Erected to honour the Irish soldiers who died in the Korean War. A total of twenty-nine Irishmen died while serving under conscription in the US Army under the banner of the UN from 1950 to 1953. The monument takes the form of a stone arch, 12 feet (3.7 m) high and 17 feet (5.2 m) wide with three granite slabs on which all 35 names, addresses and dates of death are inscribed.

=== St. Michael's Church ===
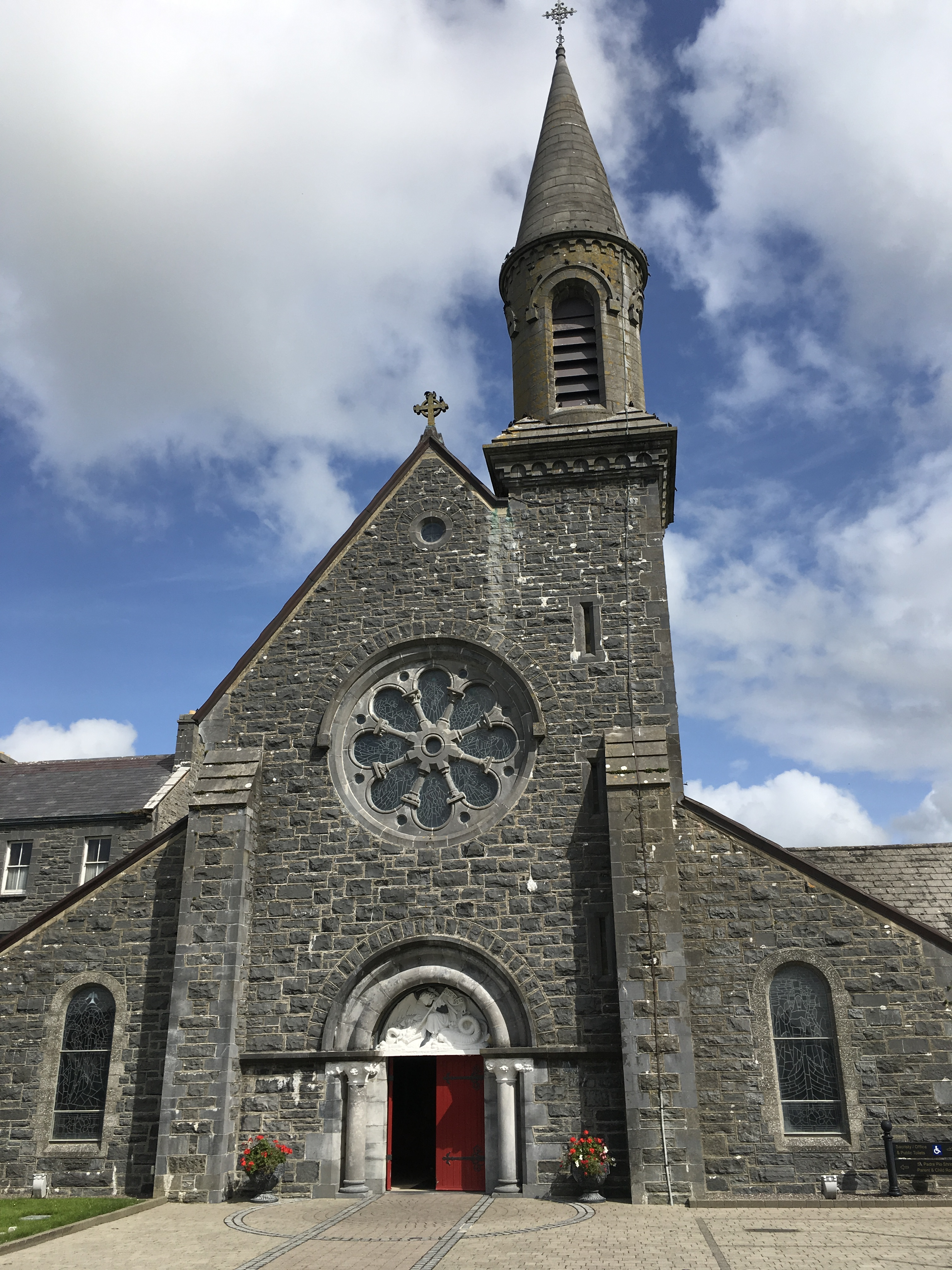
St. Michael's Church, Lixnaw

St. Michael's Church is a Roman Catholic church designed by Irish architect J. J. McCarthy, but more Norman than Celtic in design, due to having to flank the nave with aisles that open off it through round-arched arcades. It has a modernised interior.

=== Other local features ===
St. Michael's Holy Well features a statue depicting St. Michael defeating Satan. Tonaknock Cross is an early high cross which is located approximately 6 km away.

== Transport ==
The village is on the R557 road.

Bus Éireann route 272 stops several times a day, every day, serving Listowel and Tralee. There is also an occasional Local Link service to nearby villages and townlands.

Lixnaw railway station opened on 20 December 1880, closed for passenger traffic on 4 February 1963, closed for goods traffic on 2 December 1974 and finally closed altogether on 11 June 1983.

== Sport ==
The local GAA club, Lixnaw GAA, have won the Kerry Senior Hurling Championship on nine occasions, most recently in 2018. Well-known Lixnaw players include Paul Galvin and Éamonn Fitzmaurice.

== Natives ==
- Bishop David Moriarty (1814-1877), Roman Catholic prelate and orator

== See also ==
- List of towns and villages in Ireland
