= George Fitzmaurice (writer) =

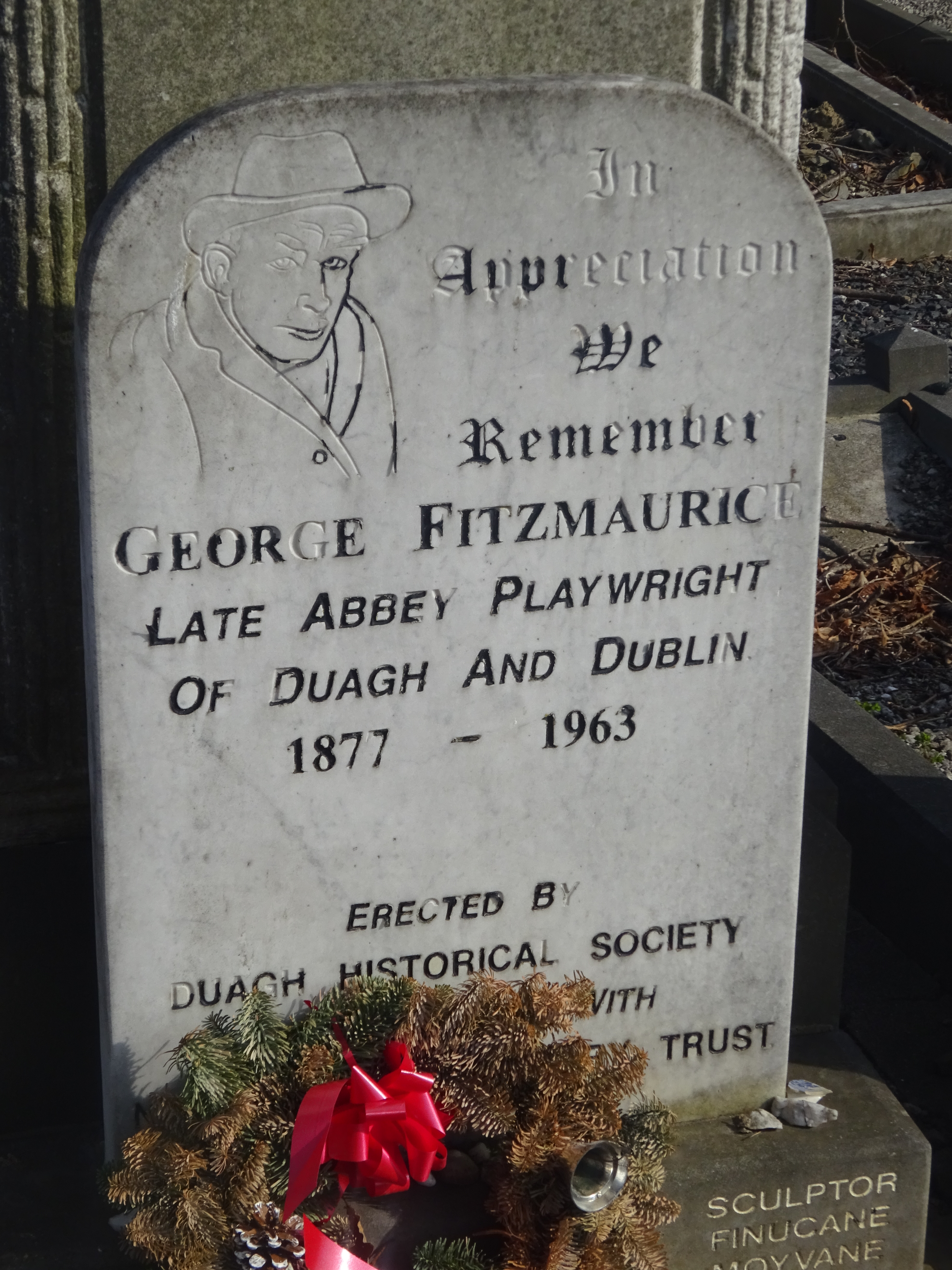
- Fitzmaurice tombstone, Mount Jerome Cemetery
- Born: 28 January 1877; Bedford House, Listowel, County Kerry, Ireland
- Died: 12 May 1963 (aged 86); 3 Harcourt Street, Dublin
- Resting place: Mount Jerome Cemetery
- Occupation: Playwright
- Writing career
- Language: English
- Genre: Theatre

George Fitzmaurice (28 January 1877 – 12 May 1963) was an Irish dramatist and short story writer, some of whose plays were broadcast on Radio Éireann.

== Early life ==
George Fitzmaurice was born at Bedford House, Listowel, County Kerry on 28 January 1877. He attended Duagh National School and later St. Michael's College, Listowel. He was brought up in the Protestant faith as his father was a Protestant clergyman and was the vicar of St. John's Church, Listowel. Fitzmaurice's father died when he was fourteen years old and the family fortune declined. Fitzmaurice took a job in Dublin as a clerk in The Congested Districts Board. In 1916 he enlisted in the British Army and returned to Dublin after the war and was diagnosed with neurasthenia, rendering him fearful of crowds. On his return to Dublin after the war, he took up a position working for the Land Commission.

== Family life ==
Fitzmaurice and his eleven siblings were the children of a mixed marriage. He and his brothers were brought up as Protestants and his sisters were brought up as Roman Catholics. His family home at Bedford, together with its extensive lands had to be given up as collateral in respect of a £60 debt owed to the local butcher. Neither Fitzmaurice nor any of his eleven siblings were to marry or have any offspring. He was the last Fitzmaurice of Duagh. There are no photographs of Fitzmaurice other than a sketch of him in later life.

== Career ==
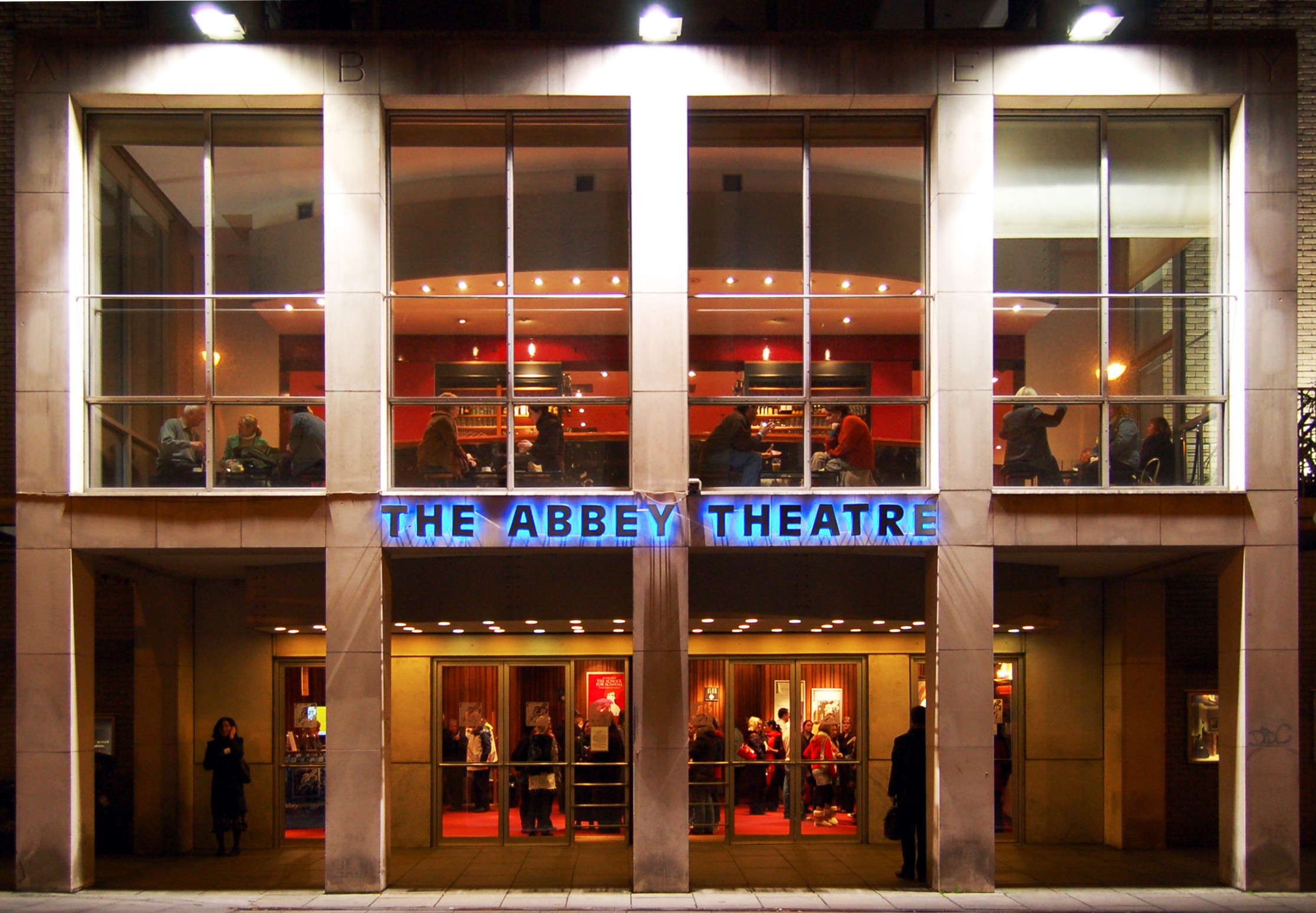
The Abbey Theatre

Fitzmaurice's first success was in 1907, with an Abbey Theatre production of his realistic comedy The Country Dressmaker which featured one of Fitzmaurice's most famous characters, Luke Quilter, "The man from the mountain". This character's appearance in the play proved to be a favourite with his audience, to the surprise of W.B. Yeats. The play's commercial success brought necessary income to the Abbey Theatre in 1907.

Fitzmaurice's second play was a dramatic fantasy called The Pie Dish. It was heavily rejected and slated by critics and considered blasphemous. This led to the rejection of another of his plays called The Dandy Dolls which is now understood as another of his best plays. It was produced in the Abbey Theatre in 1969, six years after Fitzmaurice died.

The Country Dressmaker was broadcast on Radio Éireann Players, during his lifetime, some of his dramatic works were produced by poet Austin Clarke in Lyric Theatre, Dublin. In 1923 his play Twixt by Giltinans and the Carmodys was also performed in the Abbey and eight more of his plays were printed in the literary journal The Dublin Magazine from 1924 to 1925.

== Later life and death ==
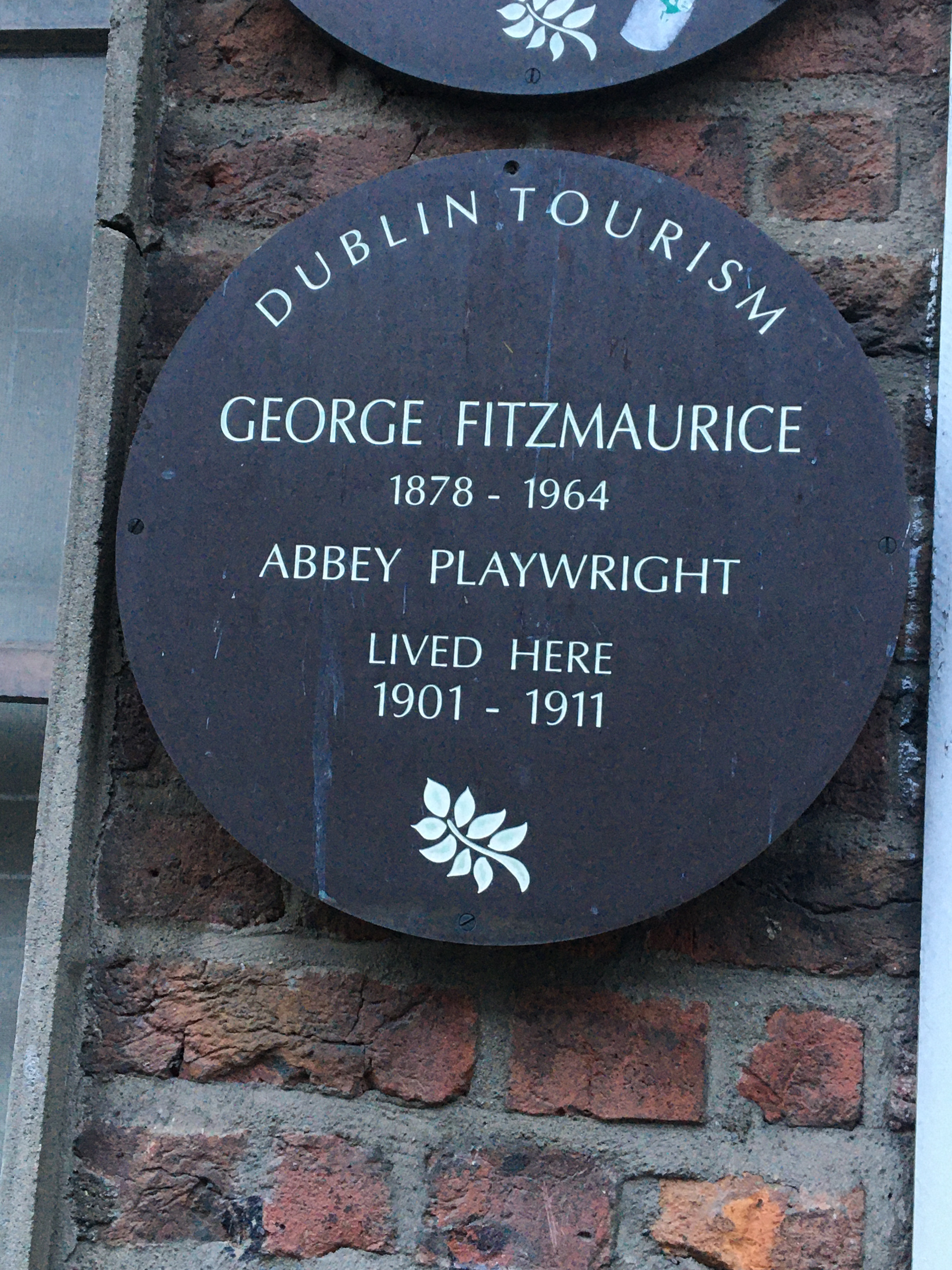
plaque to Fitzmaurice in Dublin

The effects of having fought in World War I led to him becoming "increasingly became reclusive as time passed”. With a fear of travelling and people or crowds, he spent his later years following "monotonous routines in Dublin". In 1963, Fitzmaurice died in poverty at his home at 3 Harcourt Street, and was buried in Mount Jerome cemetery.

In 1965, RTÉ reported that "the works of George Fitzmaurice are now undergoing something of a revival." A fellow Kerry playwright, John B Keane stated at the time that Fitzmaurice was increasingly being recognised as the great dramatist he truly was. He also describes his work as having "practical clarity of speech coupled with a great conciseness, and a tightness in his writing and in his construction". Michael Connor, the man who owned the Fitzmaurice property in Duagh recounted that he often saw Fitzmaurice in the town after his retirement from the civil service but by that time the dramatist had completely lost interest in seeing his own plays on the stage.

Slaughter recalls that "In Fitzmaurice’s room were no pictures of himself, few personal mementos, but he did have a copy of almost every play he had published, as well as the few in draft forms no one knew of. Besides his personal clothing, there was little else." Fitzmaurice died without leaving a will. In his native Duagh, The George Fitzmaurice Library was founded, and on 14 October 1995 a headstone that was sculpted by a local and commissioned by the Duagh Historical Society, was placed over Fitzmaurice's grave.

== Selected works ==
=== Plays ===
Similar to the plays of Synge, Fitzmaurice's plays are characterised by strong if not bitter realism mixed with outlandish modes of speech typical of the Irish people of that time.

- The Pie-Dish, 1908
- The Moonlighter, 1912
- The Dandy Dolls (written 1911, published 1914, first staged in 1945)
- The Magic Glasses, 1913
- The Country Dressmaker, 1914
- ’Twixt the Giltinans and the Carmodys, 1923.
