= R556 road (Ireland) =

Road in Ireland

R556 road
- Bóthar R556

Location
- Country: Ireland

Highway system
- Roads in Ireland; Motorways; Primary; Secondary; Regional

The R556 road is a regional road in Ireland, linking Tralee and Abbeydorney before joining up with the R551 at Glanerdalliv Bridge in County Kerry.

== Route ==
It starts in the centre of Tralee at the junction of Pembroke Street and Rock Street and continues to Abbeydorney and Ballinclogher Cross where it terminates upon meeting the R551 at Glanerdalliv Bridge. The R551 then continues to Ballyduff, Ballybunion, Ballylongford and Tarbert.

== See also ==
- Roads in Ireland
- National primary road
- National secondary road
