= Listowel =

Town in County Kerry, Ireland

Listowel Lios Tuathail (Irish)
- Town
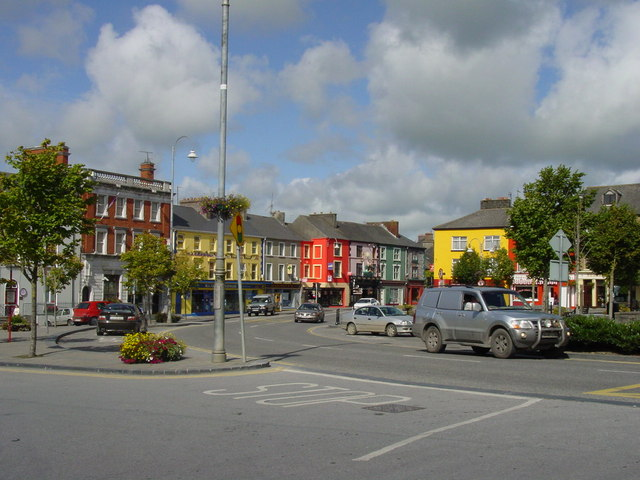
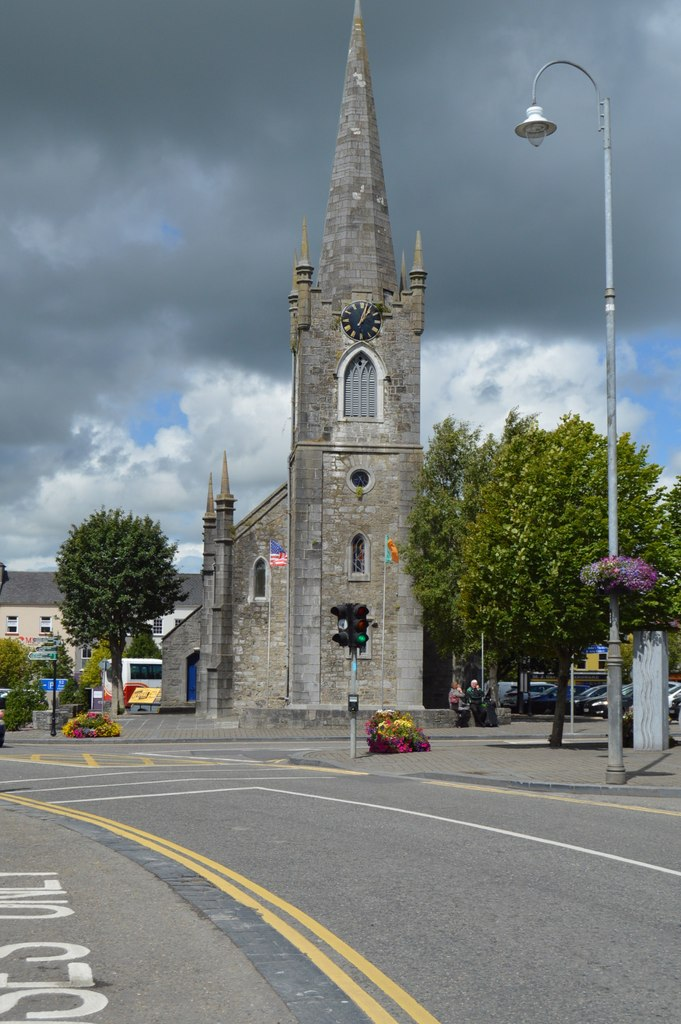
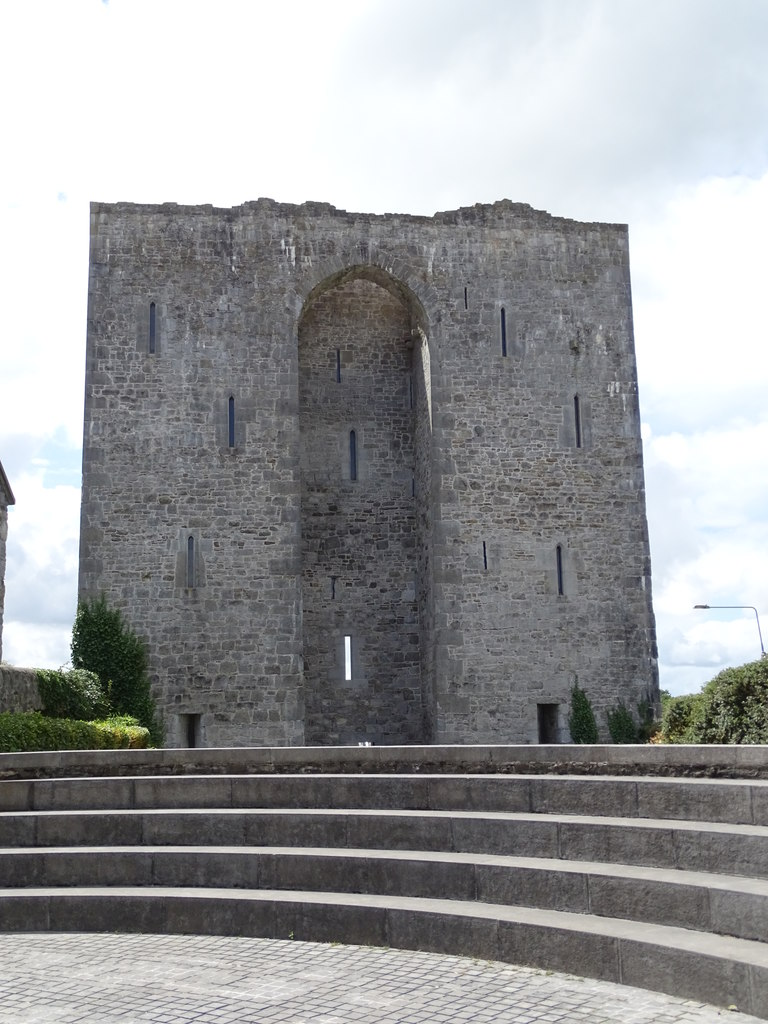
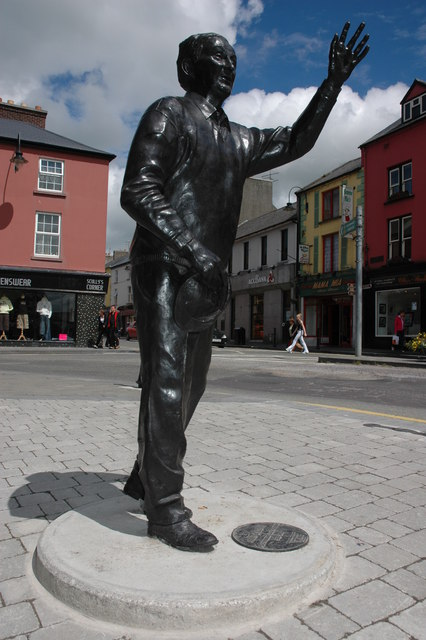
- Town square St John's Theatre Listowel Castle John B. Keane statue St Mary's Church

- Coat of arms

- Location in Ireland
- Coordinates: 52.447°N 9.486°W
- Country: Ireland
- Province: Munster
- County: County Kerry

Area
  - Total: 5.4 km^{2} (2.1 sq mi)
- Elevation: 27 m (89 ft)

Population (2022)
  - Total: 4,794
  - Rank: 92nd
  - Density: 890/km^{2} (2,300/sq mi)
- Time zone: UTC±0 (WET)
  - Summer (DST): UTC+1 (IST)
- Eircode routing key: V31
- Telephone area code: +353(0)68
- Irish Grid Reference: Q988338

Historical population
| Year | Pop. | ±% |
|---|---|---|
| 1831 | 2,289 | — |
| 1841 | 2,598 | +13.5% |
| 1851 | 2,134 | −17.9% |
| 1861 | 2,273 | +6.5% |
| 1871 | 2,199 | −3.3% |
| 1881 | 2,965 | +34.8% |
| 1891 | 3,566 | +20.3% |
| 1901 | 3,605 | +1.1% |
| 1911 | 3,409 | −5.4% |
| 1926 | 2,917 | −14.4% |
| 1936 | 3,098 | +6.2% |
| 1946 | 3,311 | +6.9% |
| 1951 | 3,149 | −4.9% |
| 1956 | 3,144 | −0.2% |
| 1961 | 2,859 | −9.1% |
| 1966 | 2,822 | −1.3% |
| 1971 | 3,021 | +7.1% |
| 1981 | 3,649 | +20.8% |
| 1986 | 3,693 | +1.2% |
| 1991 | 3,597 | −2.6% |
| 1996 | 3,656 | +1.6% |
| 2002 | 3,999 | +9.4% |
| 2006 | 4,338 | +8.5% |
| 2016 | 4,820 | +11.1% |
| 2022 | 4,794 | −0.5% |

Listowel (/ˈlɪstoʊl/ LISS-tohl; Irish: Lios Tuathail, meaning 'Tuathal's ringfort', pronounced [l̠ʲɪsˠ ˈt̪ˠuəhəlʲ]) is a heritage market town in County Kerry, Ireland. It is on the River Feale, 28 km (17 mi) from the county town, Tralee. The town of Listowel had a population of 4,794 according to the 2022 census, the third largest in the county. Listowel is also the name of a townland within the town and an encompassing civil parish.

The town has been described by the organisers of Listowel's writers' festival as the "Literary Capital of Ireland". A number of internationally known playwrights and authors have lived there, including Bryan MacMahon and John B. Keane.

== Location ==
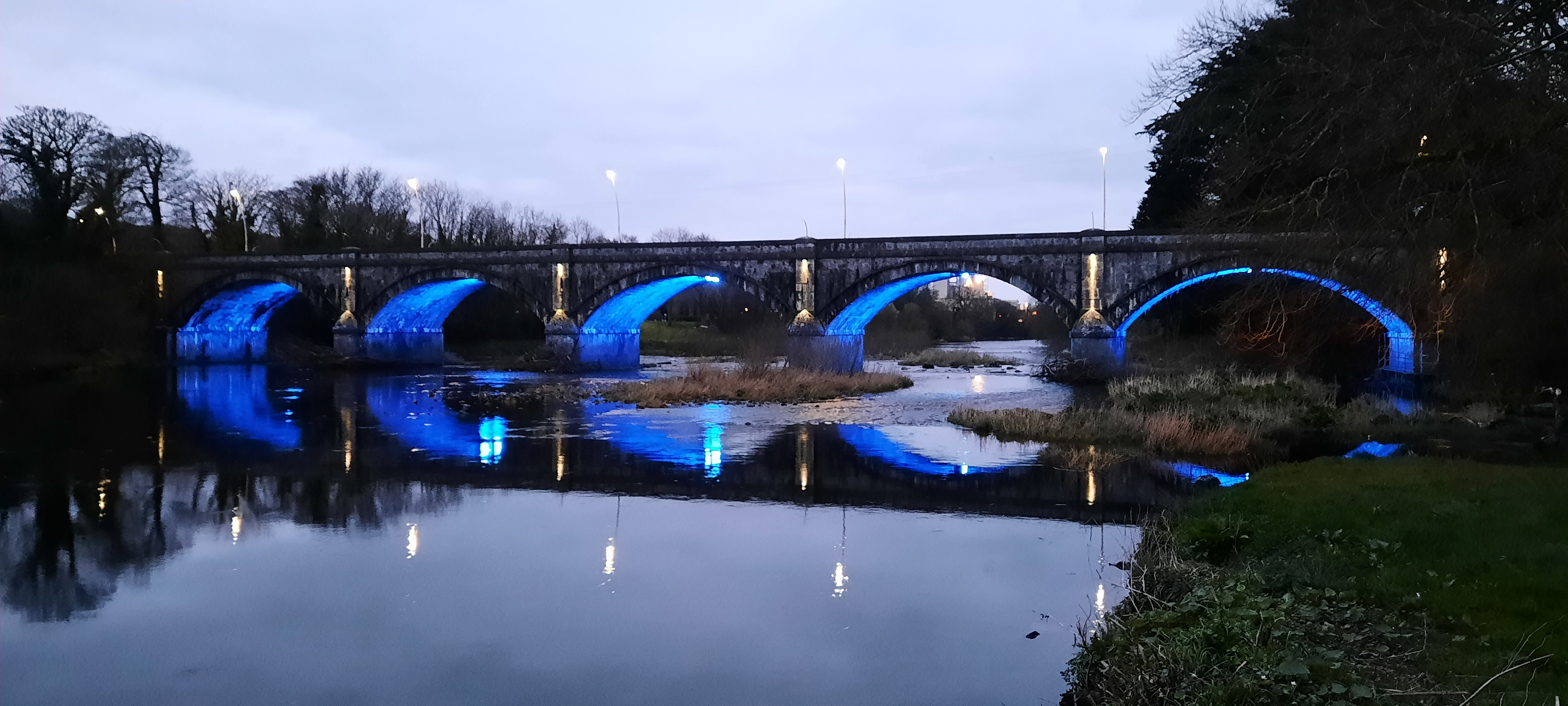
Bridge over the River Feale at Listowel, floodlit at dusk

Listowel is on the N69 Limerick – Foynes – Tralee road. Bus Éireann provides daily services to Tralee, Cork, and Limerick. The nearest railway station is Tralee. Listowel used to have its own railway station on a broad gauge line between Tralee and Limerick city; however, this was closed to passengers in 1963, to freight in 1978, and finally abandoned and lifted in 1988. The station building has been preserved as a private residence.

Listowel is located at the head of the North Kerry limestone plain. Positioned in the very heart of North Kerry, on the River Feale, its hinterland is an area of mainly dairy agricultural use. The barony of Iraghticonnor is to the north, with the barony of Clanmaurice to the south. Surrounding villages include Asdee, Ballybunion, Ballyduff, Ballylongford, Causeway, Duagh, Lisselton, Lixnaw, Moyvane, Finuge and Tarbert.

== History ==
In July 2000, Listowel was officially designated as one of Ireland's 26 "Heritage Towns" – in part because of modern environmental and renewal works, but also because of its architectural heritage and "historic importance".

=== Origin of the name ===
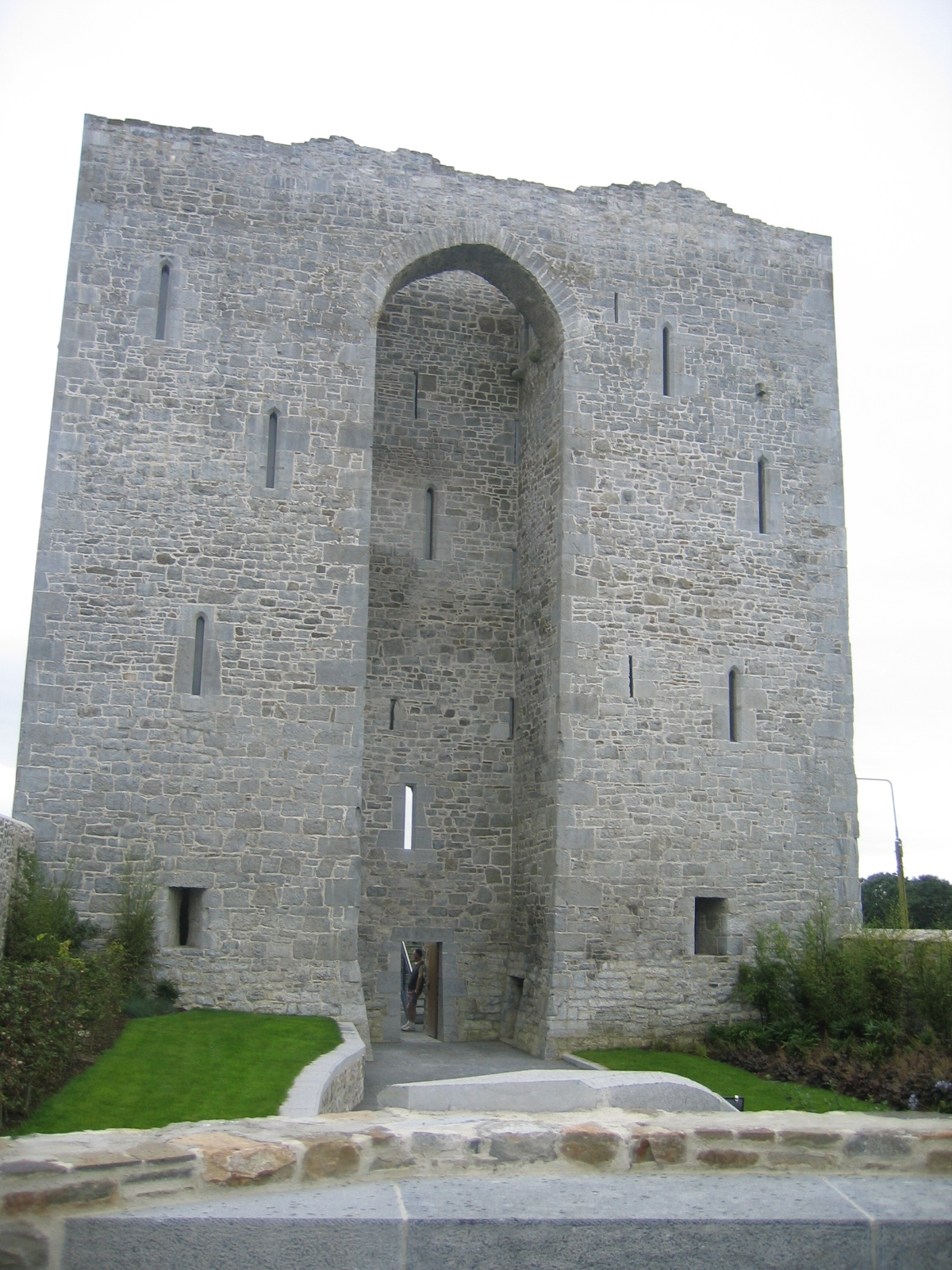
Listowel Castle

Listowel's history dates back to at least 1303 when it first appears in the Plea Roll where its name took the form of Lystothyl. By 1320 the town is referred to in ecclesiastical tax records, mis-written as Lismokill. In subsequent documents the name of the town is written variously as: Lissmoli, Listuoli, Lystuanyl, Lestovell, Lestowell, Lishtoghill, Listwohill and Listowhil. In the Annals of the Four Masters, in an entry dated 1582, the town first appears as Lios Tuathail, the currently accepted spelling of the Irish Gaelic form of the town's name. Thomas Dineley wrote the English form of the name as 'Listoel' in 1681. In the late eighteenth and early nineteenth century there were two versions of the name in use, Listowel and Listowell. From the late 19th century onward, the current spelling of Listowel was generally adopted. Since the foundation of the Irish State in 1922, the town's name has been referred to as Listowel in statute law, for example in the Statutory Instrument under the Local Government Reform Act 2014, when the Municipal District of Listowel was established as one of the six municipal districts in County Kerry.

=== Listowel Castle ===
The town developed around a fortress of the Fitzmaurice family, Listowel Castle, and its square. The castle, built in the 15th century, was the last bastion against Queen Elizabeth I in the Desmond campaign and was the last fortress of the Geraldines to be subdued. Later, it fell after 28 days' siege to Sir Charles Wilmot on 5 November 1600, who had the castle's garrison executed in the following days. The castle became the property of the Hare family, the holders of the title of Earl of Listowel, after reverting away from the Fitzmaurices, Knights of Kerry. It is now a national monument, and was subject to restoration by the Office of Public Works (OPW) from 2005. OPW tour guides are now based at the castle during the summer tourist season giving free tours of the castle.

Another smaller castle at Ballinruddery, Listowel, was built in the post-1600 period by the then Knight of Kerry.

The effect of the famine on Listowel are commemorated by a communal grave at Teampaillin Bán, on the outskirts of the town

=== Lartigue Monorailway ===
Listowel played a role in Irish railway history as it was the site of the world's first monorail operation. The Listowel and Ballybunion Railway was built to the Lartigue system, with a double-engined steam locomotive straddling an elevated rail. It officially opened on 29 February 1888, with public services beginning on 5 March 1888. It connected the town with Ballybunion. Coaches, with a compartment on either side of the rail, had to be kept balanced. If a cow was being brought to market, two calves would be sent also, to balance it on the other side. The calves would then be returned, one on either side of the rail. In 2003, a 1000 m long replica of the original monorailway was opened.

=== Listowel Mutiny ===
Listowel was the site of a noted mutiny which occurred during the Irish War of Independence. On 17 June 1920, members of the Royal Irish Constabulary at Listowel police station refused to obey the commanding officer's orders that they be relocated to police outposts outside of the town. The Black and Tans had occupied the town barracks, forcing the redeployment, something which was both dangerous and hopeless in the face of huge local hostility to the men in question. Police commissioner Colonel Smythe wished that the RIC constables would operate with the army in countering the IRA's operations in the more rural areas. He suggested while negotiating with the constables that they would be given the power to shoot any suspect on sight. Led by Constable Jeremiah Mee, they refused, both from a point of personal safety and possibly also from a sense of sympathy with their country men struggling against the British forces. The officers were discharged after the mutiny. The episode became known as the Listowel mutiny.

=== Earl of Listowel ===
The title of Earl of Listowel is associated with the Hare family. The current incumbent Lord Listowel is Francis Michael Hare, one of the 92 hereditary peers elected to the British House of Lords.

Holders of the title have included William Hare, 5th Earl of Listowel, who was a Labour politician and served as the last Secretary of State for India and Burma. Another member of the family was the Conservative politician John Hare, 1st Viscount Blakenham. He was the third son of the fourth Earl.

== Economy ==
Dairy production has historically been a significant employer in the area. Originally formed in Listowel in 1972 as North Kerry Milk Products, the Kerry Group subsequently grew to become a "global player in the agri-food sector". Formed in the 1970s, when small dairies in Ireland started to merge so as to be able to compete with larger companies within the European Economic Community, several dairies in County Kerry followed suit. By January 1974, the organisation was trading as Kerry Co-operative Creameries Ltd (Kerry Co-op). Between 1974 and 1979, Kerry Co-Op expanded its milk business and the Listowel-based co-op acquired previously independent dairies in Killarney, Limerick, Cork, Galway and Moate. Subsequently headquartered in Tralee, the Kerry Group was employing approximately 290 people at its manufacturing plant in Listowel by 2017.

== Education ==
Listowel is serviced by many primary, post-primary and post-leaving certificate education facilities. Children between five and twelve are facilitated by Presentation Primary School for girls, Scoil Realta na Maidne, for boys, and Gaelscoil Lios Tuathail, which is a mixed school. The town has two Catholic secondary schools, Presentation Secondary School, Listowel and St. Michael's College. The town is also served by Listowel Community College, a mixed post-primary and post-leaving certificate school and Coláiste na Ríochta, a mixed post-primary school. The town hosts Learning Initiative of North Kerry.

== Festivals and events ==
=== Listowel Races ===
The origin of Listowel races can be traced back to an annual gathering at Ballyeigh, Ballybunion, about nine miles from Listowel. This event, which dates to the early nineteenth century, consisted of a variety of games, horse-racing and a pre-arranged faction fight which concluded the event. Due to disturbances surrounding these fights, the meeting at Ballyeigh was suspended and racing transferred to Listowel, where the first meeting took place in 1858. The racecourse is located beside the River Feale, and two of the three entrances to the course are accessed by bridge across the river. The racecourse is called "the island" by the locals due to this fact. Traditionally it was a meeting where farmers came to spend/gamble the money they made from the harvest but it has since grown into something larger and more wide-ranging.

The Listowel track consists of a 1-mile, 2 furlong mile oval left-handed track with National Hunt fences and hurdles. The hurdle course is adjustable after each day's racing to give new ground. Listowel's racecourse is within walking distance of the town centre.

=== Listowel Writers' Week ===
Founded in 1970, Listowel is home to Ireland's oldest literary festival. North Kerry is the birthplace of many of Ireland's most prominent writers, including John B Keane, Bryan Mac Mahon, Brendan Kennelly, Seamus Wilmot, Gabriel Fitzmaurice, George Fitzmaurice, Maurice Walsh and Robert Leslie Boland. The Writers' Week Festival was established to celebrate those writers and to provide an opportunity for other Irish writers to develop their talents and meet new audiences.

The concept of the Literary Workshop was first introduced at Writers' Week in 1971 by Bryan MacMahon. At the event, writers share their skills in poetry, fiction, theatre, and screen – with workshops in song writing, comic writing and storytelling also subsequently added. Writers' Week also provides a programme of literary events including lectures, readings, workshops, book launches, seminars, theatre, literary and historical tours, art exhibitions, music and dance.

Competitions are also held, together with a series of literary awards. The total prize fund of €35,000 includes the Kerry Group Novel of the Year and The Pigott Poetry Prize.

Participants have included: Nobel Laureate and Booker Prize-winner J. M. Coetzee, Nobel Laureate Seamus Heaney, Booker Prize winners Kazuo Ishiguro, John Banville, James Kelman and Anne Enright, Poets Laureate Ted Hughes, Carol Ann Duffy, and Andrew Motion, playwrights Tom Murphy, Brian Friel, Roddy Doyle, Frank McGuinness and Hugh Leonard, poets Michael Hartnett, Leland Bardwell, John Montague, Yevgeny Yevtushenko, Nuala Ní Dhomhnaill, Roger McGough, Rita Ann Higgins and Kate Cruise O'Brien, and other novelists and writers including Blake Morrison, Chris Whyte, Lionel Shriver, Colm Tóibín, Jennifer Johnston, John McGahern, Joseph O'Neill, Sebastian Barry, Joseph O'Connor, Hugo Hamilton, Edna O'Brien, Douglas Kennedy, Patrick McGrath, William Trevor, Colum McCann, Gerard Donovan, Frank McCourt, Irvine Welsh, Robyn Rowland, Andrew Lindsay, Michael Cunningham, Jane Urquhart, Anatoly Kudryavitsky, Cees Nooteboom, Michael Dibdin, Abdel Bari Atwan, Clive James, Melvyn Bragg, Alain De Botton, Lloyd Jones, Robert Fisk, Jung Chang, Terry Jones, Gabriel Byrne, and Graham Norton.

John B. Keane of Listowel wrote:

Beautiful Listowel, serenaded night and day by the gentle waters of the River Feale.
Listowel where it is easier to write than not to write,
Where first love never dies, and the tall streets hide the loveliness,
The heartbreak and the moods, great and small,
Of all the gentle souls of a great and good community.
Sweet, incomparable hometown that shaped and made me.

=== Listowel Food Fair ===
The Listowel food Fair has been running annually since 1995. The festival promotes local artisan food products, and attracts celebrity chefs, nutritionists and artisan food entrepreneurs.

=== Fleadh Cheoil na hÉireann ===
Listowel has played host to several editions of Fleadh Cheoil na hÉireann, hosting the event more than any other venue since its foundation in 1951. The Fleadh was held in Listowel on 14 occasions between 1970 and 2002. The level of organisation brought to the hosting of the event, by the Listowel branch of Comhaltas Ceoltóirí Éireann, was credited with modernising the event and laying down a template which several successor host towns have followed. This included ensuring the festival generated a profit to fund future events.

View of Listowel, the River Feale, and racetrack.

== Political representation ==
At Irish local government level, the town of Listowel is located in the Municipal District of Listowel, which is named after the town. This is one of the six municipal districts in County Kerry, each of which also acts as a local electoral area (LEA) for the purpose of returning members to the local authority. The Listowel LEA currently elects six of the 33 members of Kerry County Council. In the 2019 Kerry County Council election, six councillors were elected from the Listowel LEA, three representing the Fine Gael party, two representing Sinn Féin, one representing Fianna Fáil and one independent councillor. Under the Local Government Reform Act 2014, as well as being members of Kerry County Council, the six Listowel LEA councillors are also members of Listowel Municipal District Council. As a division of a local authority, a Municipal District can exercise certain powers of the local authority.

At national level, Listowel is part of the five seat of the Kerry Dáil constituency, which returns five TDs to Dáil Éireann. For European Parliament elections, Listowel is located in the Ireland South constituency, which elects five of Ireland's fourteen MEPs.

== Sport ==
Listowel Emmets is a Gaelic Athletic Association (GAA) club which supports the traditional Irish sport of Gaelic football, plus music, dance and the Irish language. The club has a tradition of GAA involvement and achievement since June 1885 when Listowel GAA (The Feale Amateurs) was established as a GAA branch. In 1956 Emmets GAA Club was formed and in the following year the senior, intermediate and minor North Kerry League titles were won. In 1979, the Listowel Emmets GAA pitch next to St. Michaels College was closed for redevelopment; it re-opened again in 1981, and was renamed in honour of Frank J Sheehy who was appointed as chairman to the County Board in 1953.

Listowel Celtic is the local soccer club, playing in the Premier A division of the Kerry District League. Listowel also has clubs involved in tennis, athletics, rugby, basketball, badminton and cricket. Listowel also hosts a 24hr running race; the Listowel Endurance Festival.

== Architecture ==
Listowel's architectural features include the four-arch bridge traversing the River Feale at the entrance to the town. Dating from 1829, according to local tradition this bridge (referred to locally as the "Big Bridge") replaced a smaller wooden structure, which had been destroyed in floods.

Local plasterer and builder Pat McAuliffe (1846–1921) used stucco or external plaster to decorate the façades of townhouses and shops in the town and surrounding area. A native of Listowel, McAuliffe created a number of plasterwork works, including "The Maid of Erin", which depicts a romantic image of Mother Ireland surrounded by a harp, a wolfhound and other symbols of Ireland. The Maid was at the centre of a controversy in 1999 when a new owner decided to "cover her dignity" and painted a dress on her famous bosom. A debate ensued and he was persuaded to return her to her original semi-nude state.

Maid of Erin

Plaster relief

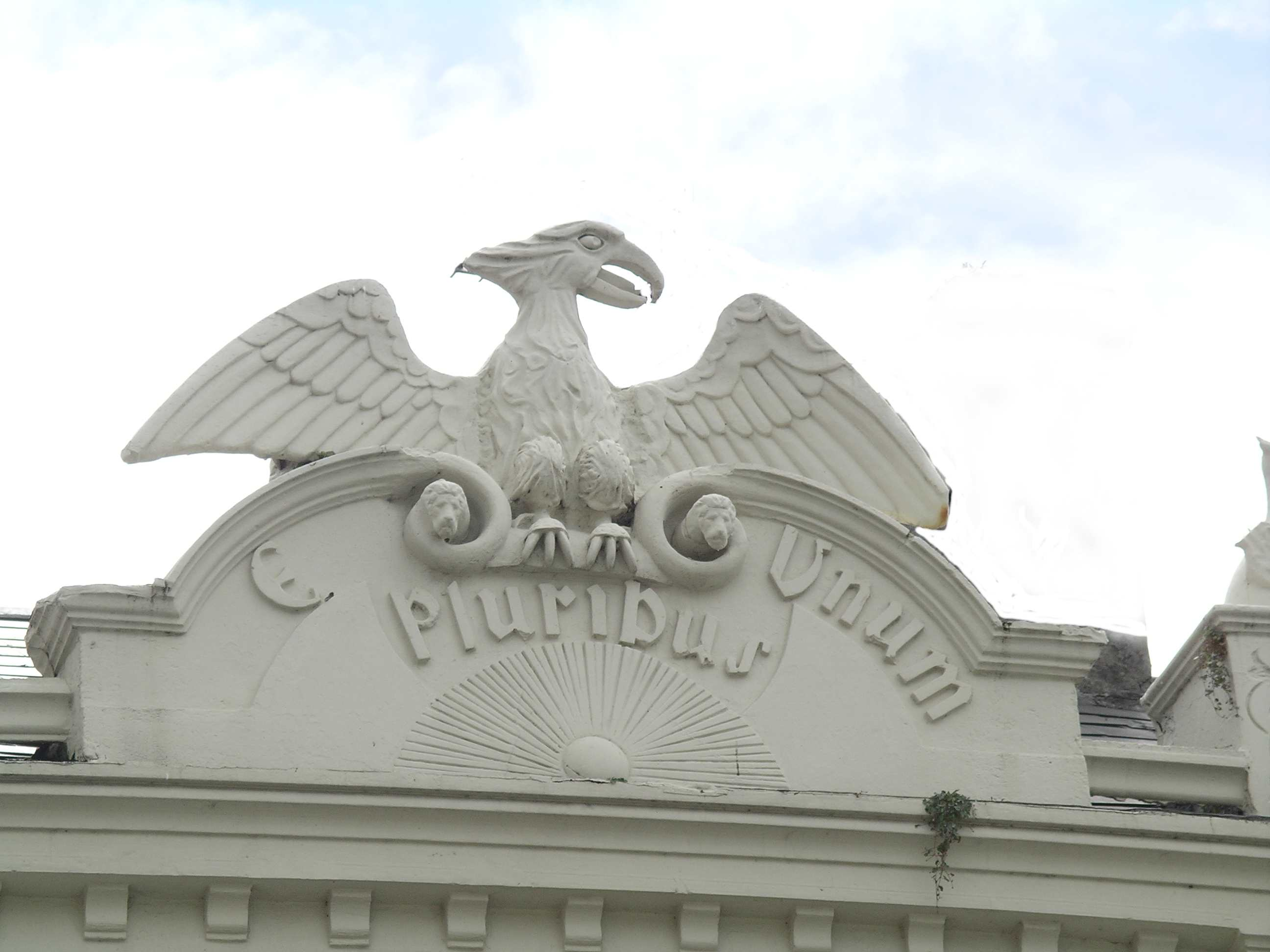
Emporium

== Notable people ==
=== Art and academics ===
- Gerard Barrett, writer and director
- George Fitzmaurice, writer (1877–1963)
- Eamon Keane, actor and writer
- John B. Keane, playwright, novelist and essayist
- Brendan Kennelly, poet and novelist from Ballylongford near Listowel
- Bryan MacMahon, playwright and novelist
- John Moriarty, writer and academic
- T. F. O'Rahilly language scholar
- Alfred O'Rahilly, president of UCC
- Cecile O'Rahilly, academic
- Maurice Walsh, author of The Quiet Man
- Robert Grenville Gayer-Anderson (1881–1945), surgeon, soldier, colonial administrator who is known for his collection of antiquities.

=== Military, politics and public service ===
- John Connors, Victoria Cross recipient
- Jimmy Deenihan, former Gaelic footballer, TD, Minister for Arts, Heritage and the Gaeltacht, and senator 1983–2016, went to school in Listowel
- Michael Kennelly, senator since 2025
- Field Marshal The 1st Earl Kitchener, senior-ranking colonial administrator and British Army commander, born in Ballylongford. Lord Kitchener served as the British Secretary of State for War from August 1914 until June 1916, during the First World War.
- Gerard Lynch, former TD and senator
- Bryan MacMahon, former High Court judge
- Ned O'Sullivan, senator 2007–2025
- Catherine Pierse, Director of Public Prosecutions (2021-present).
- Michael J. Stack, member of the United States House of Representatives
- Amelia Wilmot, member of Cumann na mBan and spy during the Irish War of Independence.

=== Sport ===
- Brendan Guiney, footballer, All-Ireland medal holder
- Noel Kennelly, footballer, All-Ireland medal holder
- Tadhg Kennelly, footballer, All-Ireland medal holder, AFL medal holder
- Tim Kennelly, footballer, 5 senior All-Ireland, winning captain 1979, dual All-Star
- Garry McMahon, footballer, singer-songwriter, poet, and writer
- Jerry Kiernan, long-distance runner and Irish Olympian
- Stephen Stack, footballer, 2 senior All-Ireland medals

== Related communities ==
- Listowel, Ontario, Canada (founded as Mapleton in 1852, renamed after Listowel, County Kerry in June 1856)
- Downpatrick, Northern Ireland (sister city since 1981)
- Shawnee, Kansas, United States, (sister city since 1985)
- Panissières, Auvergne-Rhône-Alpes, France (sister city since 1992)
- Los Gatos, California, United States, (sister city since 1994)

== See also ==
- List of towns and villages in County Kerry
