= Bryan MacMahon (writer) =

Irish writer (1909–1998)

- Born: 29 September 1909
- Died: 12 February 1998 (aged 88); Beaumont Hospital, Dublin
- Occupation: Writer

Bryan Michael MacMahon (29 September 1909 – 13 February 1998) was an Irish playwright, novelist, short story and children's book writer from Listowel, County Kerry. A schoolteacher by training, his works include The Lion Tamer, Patsy-o and his Wonderful Pets, The Honey Spike and The Red Petticoat. He wrote an autobiography, The Master, and his works include an English translation of Peig, the Irish-language autobiography of Peig Sayers.

== Early life and education ==
MacMahon was born on 29 September 1909 to parents Patrick and Joanna MacMahon, in Listowel, County Kerry. He was one of four children, his father was a clerk in a law office, a butter-buyer and exporter, and his mother was a schoolteacher. His father was also a member of the Gaelic League. He had a traditional country up-bringing, which he illustrated in the first chapters of The Storyman (1994). He learned his love for the Irish language from his grandmother, who was a native Irish speaker. His grandfather was weighmaster in charge of the market and Bryan assisted him often. He was educated in Scoil Réalta na Maidine, Lios Tuathail, and then St Michael's College, Listowel, where he was influenced by the writer Seamus Wilmot, who encouraged him in his passion for writing. Like his mother, he also had a passion for teaching. He attended St. Patrick's Teacher Training College in Drumcondra, County Dublin. After this, he taught in Donore Avenue, off South Circular Road in Dublin. Due to family pressures, he resigned from his teaching post in Dublin in 1931 and returned to Listowel, where he lived for the remainder of his life.

He became principal teacher of Scoil Réalta na Maidine and taught there for 44 years. During the Second World War, MacMahon worked in factories in England. He wrote about this experience in his 'Plain People of England' column for The Bell magazine. He opened a book shop in his wife Kitty's name on the main street of Listowel.

== Family ==
MacMahon married his wife Kathleen "Kitty" Ryan in 1936. Kathleen was born on 14 June 1911 in Cashel, County Tipperary, to parents James Ryan and Ellen Ryan (née O'Connor). MacMahon and Ryan were married in the Roman Catholic Church of Cashel on 4 November 1936. They had five sons, including Bryan, a judge of the Irish High Court, and Garry, who played Gaelic football for the Kerry senior inter-county team from 1958 to 1962 and went on to practice law. One of his other sons, Owen, is a solicitor with PG MacMahon Solicitors.

== Later life ==
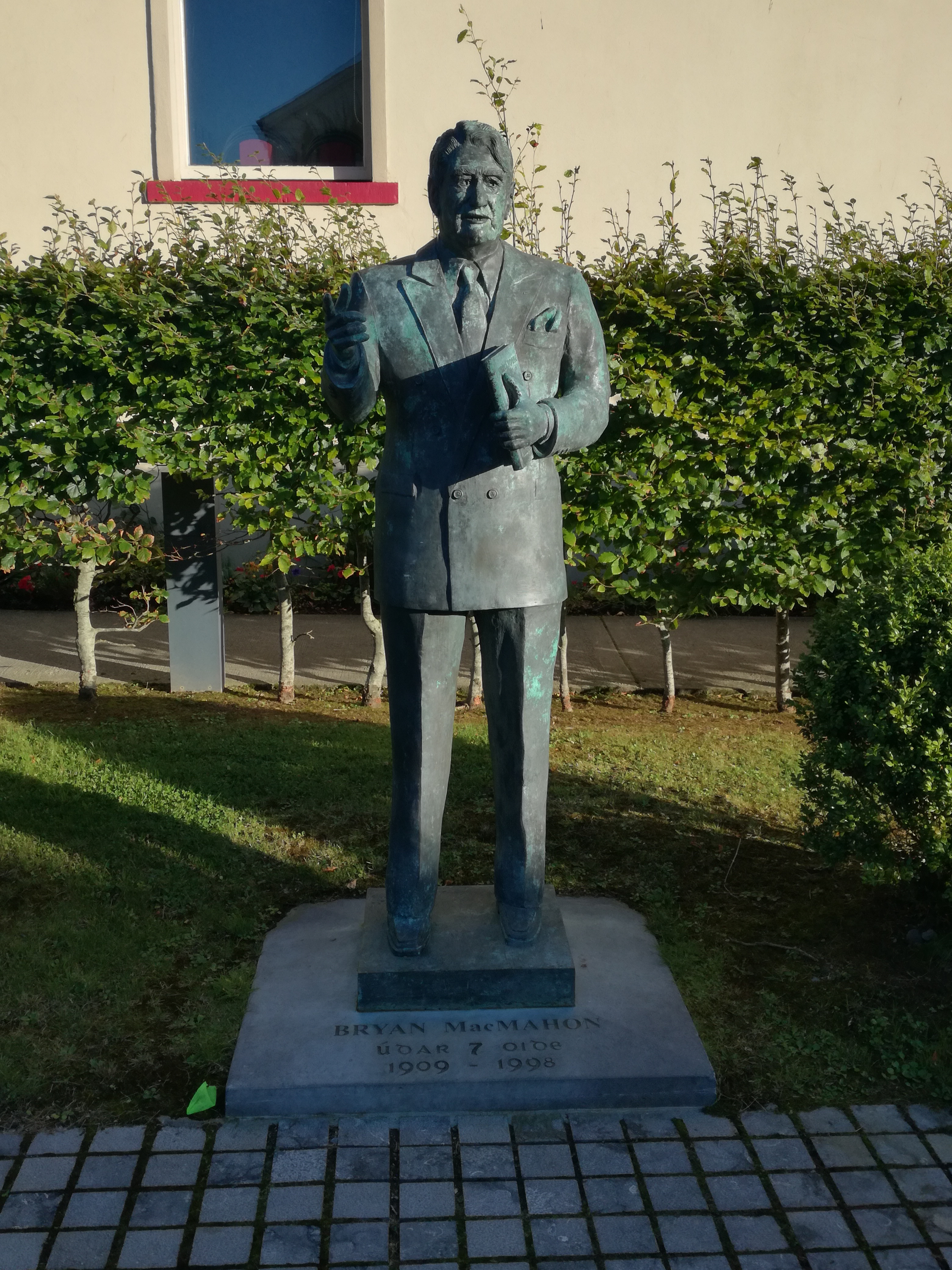
Bryan MacMahon's statue in Listowel

During his later years, MacMahon paid more attention to the media while continuing to publish. Together with John B. Keane as well as other Irish playwrights, he founded Listowel Writers' Week in 1970, an international literacy festival based in MacMahon's home town of Listowel. In 1989, MacMahon featured on The Late Late Show, with Gay Byrne. MacMahon published his first autobiography, The Master, in 1992, which documented his career in teaching. The book went on to win the 1993 The American Ireland Literary Award. MacMahon released a second autobiography in 1994, The Storyman, which focused primarily on his career as a writer.

Throughout his career, MacMahon was awarded many accolades for his contributions to Irish literature including the Kerryman of the Year award in 1987. He also was awarded American Ireland Fund Literary Award 1993 and the award of the degree of LID from the National University of Ireland in recognition of his work. MacMahon was a member of the Aosdána. MacMahon's final book, a collection of fictional conversations between men and women, is entitled A Final Fling, and was published in 1998. MacMahon died on the 13 February 1998, in Beaumont Hospital, Dublin. After his death, his colleague John B. Keane said: "The streets have lost their star. He was a giant and a gentleman, and we were lucky to have had him for so long."
