= Charles Wilmot, 1st Viscount Wilmot =

English politician and peer

Charles Wilmot, 1st Viscount Wilmot of Athlone (c. 1572 – 1644) was an English soldier active in Ireland.

== Life ==
He was the son of Edward Wilmot of Culham (otherwise of Newent, Gloucestershire and Witney, Oxfordshire) and Elizabeth Stafford. On 6 July 1587 he matriculated at Magdalen College, Oxford, aged 16, but left the university without a degree, and took service in the Irish wars, perhaps in attendance on his neighbour, Sir Thomas Norris, who was also a member of Magdalen College.

In 1592, he became a captain, and early in 1595 he was sent to Newry; in the same year he was also in command of sixty foot at Carrickfergus. In 1597 Norris, now President of Munster, made Wilmot sergeant-major of the forces in that province; he was promoted colonel in 1598. He was knighted by Robert Devereux, 2nd Earl of Essex at Dublin on 5 August 1599, and on the 16th was sent with instructions to the council of Munster for its government during Norris's illness.

On 23 June 1600, Charles Blount, 8th Baron Mountjoy directed George Carew to swear in Wilmot as a member of the Munster council, and during the next two years he took a prominent part in the closing stages of the Nine Years' War.

In July 1600, Wilmot was left by Carew in command of Carrigafoyle Castle on the River Shannon; shortly afterwards he was given command of a force of 1,050-foot and fifty horse, with which in October he defeated Thomas Fitzmaurice, 18th Baron Kerry, and in November captured Listowel Castle after sixteen days' siege. Florence Maccarthy Reagh is said to have urged Wilmot's assassination at this time, but Wilmot was reportedly forewarned by Florence's wife.

On 8 December 1600, he was granted the office of constable of Castle Maine, and, in July 1601, was appointed governor of County Cork. On 5 March 1602, he took Rahinnane Castle. In July 1602 Carew left Munster, suggesting Wilmot's appointment as vice-president; Robert Cecil, however, wrote that the queen would not "accept Wilmot or any such", but Wilmot became commander-in-chief of the forces during Carew's absence, and in September 1602 was made governor of Kerry; in the same month he captured 'Mocrumpe,' and throughout the winter was engaged in clearing Kerry of the rebels.

In the last week of December and during the first week of January 1602–03, he inflicted a series of reverses on the Irish in Beare and Bantry, completely over-running the country. In February he turned north-west, again captured Lixnaw, and subdued the Dingle peninsula, effecting a junction with Carew over the Mangerton pass.

In the following March, Wilmot was associated with Sir George Thornton in the government of Munster during Carew's absence. Cork, however, refused to acknowledge his authority and proclaim James I, and shut its gates against him. Wilmot sat down before it, and turned his guns on the inhabitants to prevent their demolishing the forts erected against the Spanish. He refused, however, to attack the city, and waited until Carew's return, when its submission was arranged. Wilmot now settled down as governor of Kerry.

In 1606, he was again acting with Thornton as joint-commissioner for the government of Munster, and in November 1607 was granted a pension and sworn of the Irish privy council. On 20 May 1611, he was granted in reversion the marshalship of Ireland, but surrendered it on 24 August 1617. He sat in the English House of Commons for Launceston from 5 April to 17 June 1614. On 3 June 1616 he was appointed President of Connaught, the seat of his government being Athlone; and, on 4 January 1621, he was created Viscount Wilmot of Athlone in the peerage of Ireland. Among the rewards for his services were grants of, among other lands, the abbey of Carrickfergus in 1614.

While president of Connaught Wilmot embarked on a scheme for rebuilding Athlone; and in 1621 Sir Charles Coote accused him of leasing and alienating crown lands and reserving the profits to himself; these charges were referred to commissioners, but Wilmot's defence was accepted for the time being, and on 7 November 1625 he received a pardon.

Charles I also renewed his appointment as president of Connaught, and in October 1627 selected him as commander of a relief expedition to be sent to the Isle of Rhé. His fleet was, however, delayed at Plymouth, first by want of supplies, and then by storms, which damaged the ships and drove them back into port. Meanwhile, the English at La Rochelle had been compelled to retreat, and Wilmot returned to Ireland, where he was appointed, on 6 November 1629, general and commander-in-chief of the forces.

On 11 September 1630, Roger Jones, 1st Viscount Ranelagh was associated with him in the presidency of Connaught, and, on 6 August 1631, he was one of the commissioners appointed to govern Dublin and Leinster during the absence of the lords justices.

In 1631, when it was resolved to supersede the lords justices of Ireland by the nomination of a lord deputy, Wilmot had hopes of being selected for the post. Thomas Wentworth's appointment he resented as a slight, and the new lord-deputy's inquisition into financial abuses soon brought him into collision with Wilmot.

In September 1634, proceedings at Athlone were again called in question; a commission of inquiry was issued early in 1635, and the Irish law officers instituted suits against Wilmot before the castle chamber on the ground of misdemeanour and in the court of exchequer for recovery of the crown lands he had alienated. Wilmot, in revenge, abetted Barr's petition against Wentworth, but, on 3 October 1635, was forced to submit, and, on 13 July 1636, sought the lord-deputy's favour. Wentworth insisted on restitution of the crown lands, but ineffectively, before his recall from Ireland.

Wilmot's age prevented his serving against the Irish Rebellion of 1641, but he retained his joint-presidency of Connaught till his death, probably in the early part of 1644. He was alive on 29 June 1643, but dead before April 1644, when his son Henry and Sir Charles Coote were appointed joint-presidents of Connaught. His will dated 21 May 1643 refers to a house near Charing Cross adjoining Scotland Yard.

== Family ==
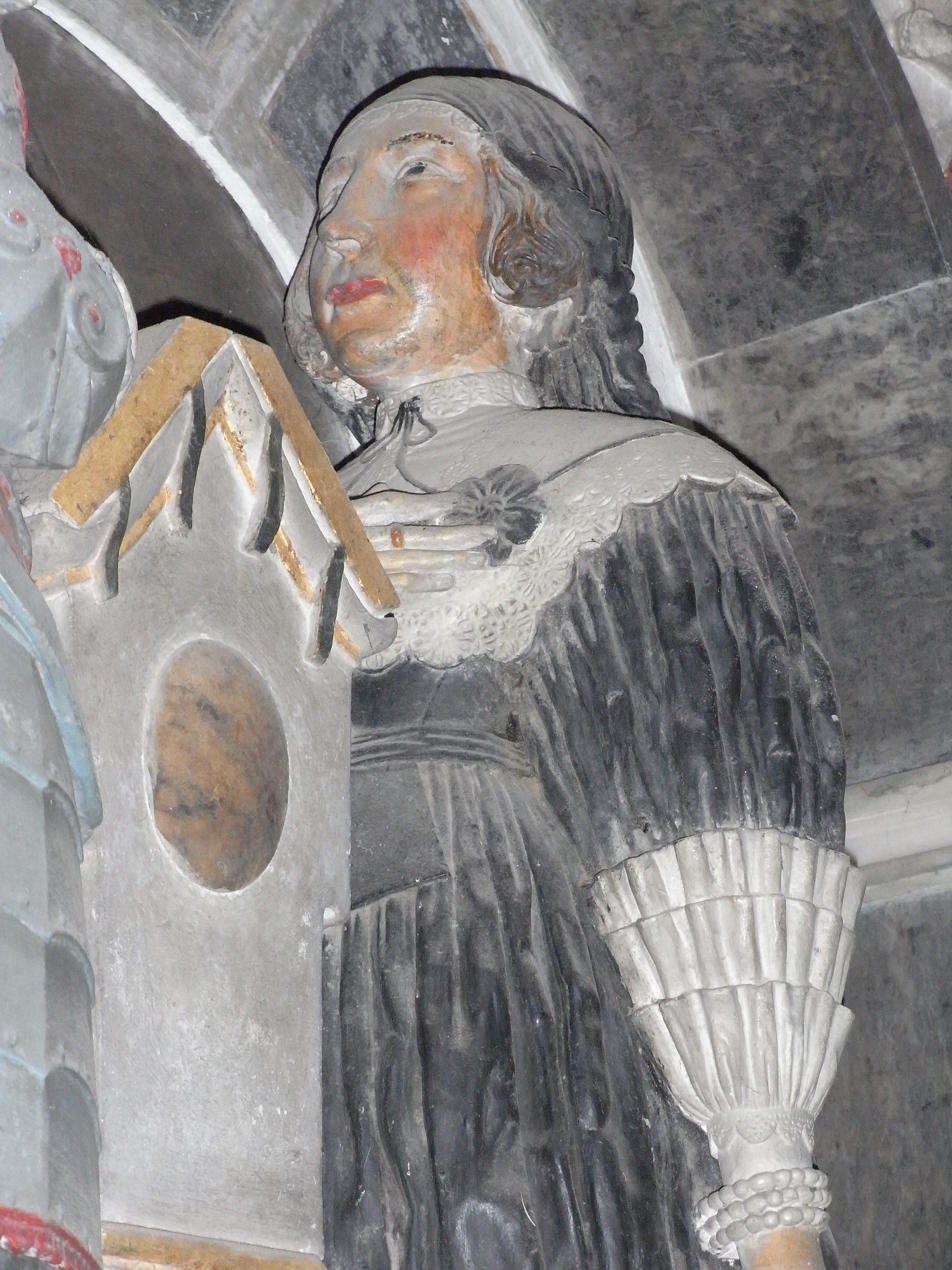
Elizabeth Wilmot (1612–1635), statue from mural monument, Burlescombe Church, Devon. Incised inscription below: "To the memory of Elizabeth Ayshford wife of Arthur Ayshford eldest sonne of Henry Ayshford Esquier only daughter of the right honourable Charles Lord Wilmot Viscount of Atllone (i.e. Athlone) late general of his majesties forces in the kingdome of Ireland now a privy counceller both of England Ireland.(sic) She dyed the 23th (sic) yeare of her age Anno D(omi)ni 1635 June 13.o"

Wilmot married, first, about 1605, Sarah, fourth daughter of Sir Henry Anderson, sheriff of London in 1601–2; by her, buried on 8 December 1615, he had issue: three sons. Their children were:

1. Arthur Wilmot (born before 1610, died 31 October/1 November 1632); married Penelope, daughter of Sir Moyses Hill of Hillsborough, Provost Marshal of Ulster, and Alice MacDonnell. Penelope died in 1694, having made two further marriages, to Sir William Brooke and Hon. Edward Russell. By her third husband she was the mother of the leading Whig statesman Edward Russell, 1st Earl of Orford.
2. Charles Wilmot (baptised 3 March 1610/1, and died unmarried, before 21 August 1633).
3. Elizabeth Wilmot (1612–1635). She was baptised on 25 May 1612. She married Arthur Ayshford, of Ayshford Manor, Burlescombe, Devon, eldest son of Henry Ayshford, Esquire. She died aged 23, and is sculpted with her husband on an ornate mural monument in Burlescombe Church, near Tiverton, Devon.
4. Henry Wilmot, 1st Earl of Rochester (baptised 26 October 1613 – 24 February 1658) married first on 28 August 1633 to Frances Morton daughter of Sir George Morton of Milborne St. Andrews, and second to Anne St John, daughter of Sir John St John, 1st Baronet.

Wilmot married, secondly, Mary, daughter of Sir Henry Colley of Castle Carbury and widow of Garret Moore, 1st Viscount Moore, who died in 1627; she survived till 3 June 1654, being buried on 3 July with her first husband in St. Peter's Roman Catholic Church, Drogheda; her correspondence with the parliamentarians during the Irish wars gave James Butler, 1st Duke of Ormonde some trouble. There were no children born from the marriage.

== Moresources ==
- British History Online Accessed 14 October 2007
- Oswald Barron, 'The Wild Wilmots', The Ancestor XI (1904), 2–4 20–21.
- "Wilmot, Charles" . Dictionary of National Biography. London: Smith, Elder & Co. 1885–1900.

Government offices
Preceded by The Earl of Clanricarde	Lord President of Connaught; 1616–1644	Succeeded by The Viscount Wilmot; Sir Charles Coote
Peerage of Ireland
New creation	Viscount Wilmot; 1616–1644	Succeeded by Henry Wilmot
