= Bryan MacMahon (judge) =

Irish High Court judge (born 1941)

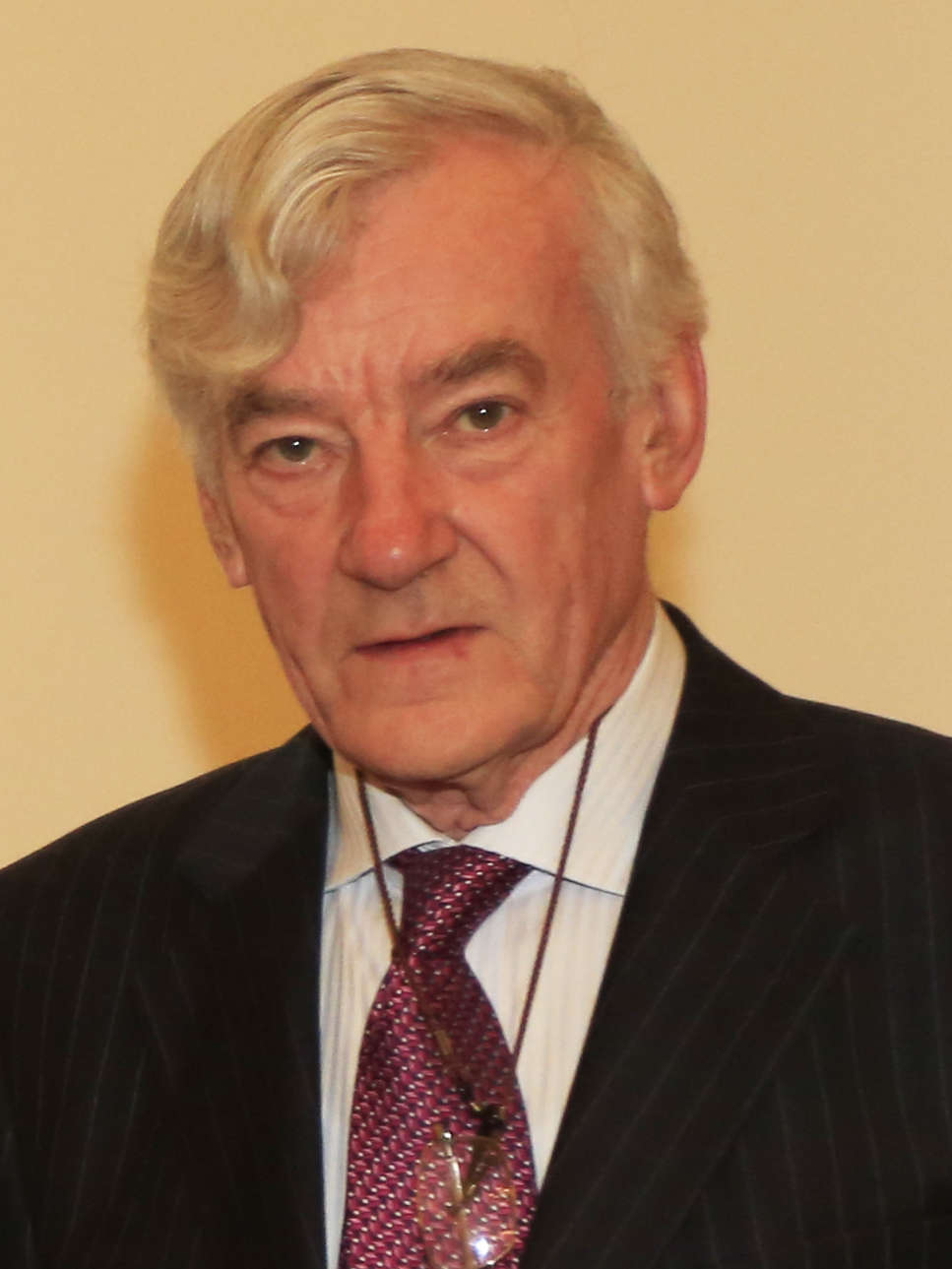

Judge of the High Court
- In office 1 August 2007 – 8 April 2011
- Nominated by: Government of Ireland
- Appointed by: Mary McAleese

Judge of the Circuit Court
- In office 11 June 1999 – 1 August 2007
- Nominated by: Government of Ireland
- Appointed by: Mary Robinson

Personal details
- Born: 10 April 1941 (age 85) Listowel, County Kerry, Ireland
- Spouse: Mary O'Neill (m. 1974)
- Relations: Bryan MacMahon (Father); Martin O’Neill (Brother-in-law)
- Children: 4
- Education: University College Dublin; Harvard University

Bryan M. E. MacMahon (born 10 April 1941) is a retired Irish judge who served as a Judge of the High Court from 2007 to 2011 and a Judge of the Circuit Court from 1999 to 2007. He is the author of textbooks on Irish law.

He is the son of short story writer Bryan MacMahon, and a native of Listowel, County Kerry.

== Legal career ==
McMahon received his BCL and LLB degrees from University College of Dublin; subsequently, having been awarded the Harvard Fellowship, he undertook further postgraduate study at Harvard Law School. He returned to Ireland in 1967 to take up a post as a Statutory Lecturer in the Law Faculty, University College Cork (UCC). During his time at UCC, MacMahon went on to become Professor of Law and Head of the Department of Law.

In 1987, McMahon joined the law firm of Houlihan and McMahon, in Ennis, County Clare, as a senior partner. While continuing to practise law, he simultaneously held a part-time Chair of Law at the NUI Galway.

== Judicial career ==
In 1999, he was appointed Circuit Court judge. In 2007, he was promoted to the High Court in recognition of his status as a leading Irish jurist. A noted and often cited scholar, he is deemed to be an authority on the bench in relation to tortious matters in Ireland.

He was appointed adjunct professor of the Faculty of Law at University College Cork in 2004.

McMahon is also Chair of the Irish Universities Quality Board and the National Archives Advisory Council.

He retired from the bench on 8 April 2011, having served for 12 years, 4 of which were as a judge of the High Court. He subsequently served as Chairman of the Referendum Commission on Judges' pay which made recommendations to Government regarding the 29th Amendment to the Constitution.

== Other roles ==
In 2005, McMahon (a lifelong theatre fan) was appointed chairman of the board of the Abbey Theatre by Minister for Arts, Sport and Tourism John O'Donoghue. The Abbey was the venue often used to showcase many plays written by McMahon's father.

== Personal life ==
MacMahon lives in Kells, County Meath. He is married to Mary O'Neill, the sister of a well renowned football club manager Martin O'Neill having managed teams such as Aston Villa.

== Legal textbooks ==
MacMahon has co-authored many legal textbooks including:

- Law of Torts, co-authored with William Binchy (Butterworths: 1980, 1989, 3rd Edition 2000);
- Casebook on Irish Law of Torts, also co-authored with William Binchy, (Butterworths 1983, 2nd Edition 1991);
- European Community Law in Ireland, co-authored with Finbarr Murphy (Butterworths: 1989).
