= 2013 Kerry Senior Football Championship =

Gaelic football competition

- Dates: 8 June - 30 November 2013
- Teams: 20
- Sponsor: Garvey's SuperValu
- Champions: Dr. Crokes (10th title); Ambrose O'Donovan (captain); Noel O'Leary (manager); Vince Casey (manager)
- Runners-up: Austin Stacks; Denis McElligott (captain); Stephen Stack (manager)
- Relegated: Finuge

Tournament statistics
- Matches played: 30
- Goals scored: 62 (2.07 per match)
- Points scored: 703 (23.43 per match)
- Top scorer(s): Shane Carroll (2-26)

The 2013 Kerry Senior Football Championship was the 113th staging of the Kerry Senior Football Championship since its establishment by the Kerry County Board in 1889. The championship ran from 8 June to 30 November 2013.

Dr. Crokes entered the championship as the defending champions in search of a fourth successive title.

The final was played on 20 October 2013 at FitzGerald Stadium in Killarney, between Dr. Crokes and Austin Stacks in what was their third meeting in the final. Dr. Crokes won the match by 4-16 to 0-12 to claim their 19th championship title overall and a fourth title in succession.

Shane Carroll was the championship's top scorer with 2-26.

== Team changes ==
=== To Championship ===
Promoted from the Kerry Intermediate Football Championship

- Finuge

=== From Championship ===
Relegated to the Kerry Intermediate Football Championship

- Gneeveguilla

== Results ==
=== Round 1 ===
8 June 2013 Round 1	South Kerry	2-17 - 1-11	East Kerry	FitzGerald Stadium
	D O'Sullivan 1-4, P O'Donoghue 1-2, B Sheehan 0-4, A Walsh 0-3, N Fitzgerald 0-1, I Galvin 0-1, B O'Dwyer 0-1, K Young 0-1.		L Murphy 0-6, M Murphy 1-0, F Coffey 0-2, D Ahern 0-1, S Foley 0-1, DJ O'Connor 0-1.

9 June 2013 Round 1	Dingle	1-16 - 1-08	Kenmare	Templenoe Grounds
	M Geaney 1-6, D Ryan 0-3, M Flaherty 0-2, JB Brosnan 0-1, J O'Sullivan 0-1, J Sheehy 0-1, M Evans 0-1, C Bambury 0-1.		S O'Brien 1-6, S O'Leary 0-1, J Spillane 0-1.

8 June 2013 Round 1	Kerins O'Rahilly's	0-11 - 2-06	Laune Rangers	Strand Road
	BJ Keane 0-4, BJ Walsh 0-3, D Quill 0-3, K O'Mahony 0-1.		MF Russell 1-4, S Daly 1-0, J Sheehan 0-1, G Mahony 0-1.

8 June 2013 Round 1	Dr. Crokes	2-18 - 0-07	Killarney Legion	FitzGerald Stadium
	K O'Leary 1-5, J Doolan 1-4, C Cooper 0-5, A O'Sullivan 0-2, S Myers 0-1, A O'Donovan 0-1.		J O'Donoghue 0-2, D O'Sullivan 0-2, J Lyne 0-1, B Maguire 0-1, D Pyne 0-1.

9 June 2013 Round 1	Feale Rangers	0-19 - 1-15 (aet)	Mid Kerry	O'Rahilly Park
	C Cox 0-10, B Murphy 0-2, P Quille 0-2, D Walsh 0-1, K Quirke 0-1, A Maher 0-1, N O'Connor 0-1, B Whelan 0-1.		S O'Sullivan 0-6, G O'Grady 0-6, A Cahillane 1-0, G Sayers 0-1, D O'Sullivan 0-1, D Walsh 0-1.

9 June 2013 Round 1	Rathmore	1-12 - 0-14	West Kerry	Rathbeg Grounds
	M O'Riordan 0-7, MA Kelleher 1-0, J Buckley 0-2, B O'Keeffe 0-1, A O'Mahony 0-1, P Reen 0-1.		A Fitzgerald 0-7, S Hennessy 0-2, SM Ó Conchúir 0-2, C Ó Gealbháin 0-1, J Hickson 0-1, M Ó Sé 0-1.

9 June 2013 Round 1	St. Kieran's	0-20 - 0-11	Kilcummin	Brosna Grounds
	E Walsh 0-6, T Hickey 0-4, P O'Connor 0-3, EJ O'Donoghue 0-3, J Walsh 0-3, M Finnegan 0-1.		DJ Fleming 0-5, S McSweeney 0-2, S Brosnan 0-1, K Gorman 0-1, N Duggan 0-1, K McCarthy 0-1.

9 June 2013 Round 1	Austin Stacks	1-12 - 0-07	Shannon Rangers	O'Rahilly Park
	S Carroll 0-6, D O'Brien 1-1, S O'Callaghan 0-2, M Collins 0-2, D Bohane 0-1.		P Kennelly 0-4, G O'Sullivan 0-1, T Joy 0-1, C Mulvihill 0-1.

9 June 2013 Round 1	Milltown/Castlemaine	3-14 - 2-13 (aet)	St. Brendan's	Páirc de Búrca
	I Twiss 2-8, JB Hassett 1-0, P Wrenn 0-1, C Moriarty 0-1, M Mangan 0-1, D Kelliher 0-1, C Kerins 0-1, P Carroll 0-1.		D O'Callaghan 0-8, D Culloty 2-0, B Poff 0-2, I Parker 0-2, J Dowling 0-1.

9 June 2013 Round 1	St. Michaels/Foilmore	1-11 - 1-05	Finuge	Ballinskelligs Grounds
	E O'Connor 1-5, B Kelly 0-3, B Galvin 0-1, DJ Moran 0-1, Darragh O'Sullivan 0-1.		P Galvin 1-3, P Corridan 0-1, E Galvin 0-1.

=== Round 2 ===
15 June 2013 Round 2	St. Brendan's	1-10 - 0-11 (aet)	Finuge	Blennerville Grounds
	J Moriarty 1-4, D Wallace 0-1, M Griffin 0-1, A O'Donoghue 0-1, J Egan 0-1, D O'Callaghan 0-1, D Carmody 0-1.		P Galvin 0-6, M Corridan 0-1, J Flaherty 0-1, E Galvin 0-1, R Heffernan 0-1, J Corridan 0-1.

15 June 2013 Round 2	Kenmare	2-11 - 1-18	East Kerry	Templenoe Grounds
	S O'Brien 1-7, T Doyle 1-0, S O'Leary 0-2, K Spillane 0-1, K O'Sullivan 0-1.		L Murphy 0-9, DJ O'Connor 0-5, JP Brosnan 1-0, MS O'Donoghue 0-2, D Ahern 0-1, J O'Donoghue 0-1.

15 June 2013 Round 2	West Kerry	0-12 - 1-07	Shannon Rangers	O'Rahilly Park
	SM Ó Conchúir 0-4, A Fitgerald 0-3, S Hennessy 0-2, T Ó Sé 0-1, E Hickson 0-1, J Crean 0-1.		B O'Grady 1-0, K Mulvihill 0-2, G O'Sullivan 0-2, PJ Connelly 0-2, P Kennelly 0-1.

16 June 2013 Round 2	Kerins O'Rahilly's	0-15 - 1-07	Kilcummin	Strand Road
	BJ Keane 0-7, BJ Walsh 0-3, J Savage 0-2, J Ferguson 0-1, K Walsh 0-1, K O'Mahony 0-1.		DJ Fleming 0-4, K Murphy 1-0, J Sheehan 0-1, K Teahon 0-1, C O'Leary 0-1.

16 June 2013 Round 2	Killarney Legion	2-08 - 0-11	Mid Kerry	Dirren Grounds
	J O'Donoghue 1-4, D O'Sullivan 1-2, C Keane 0-2.		G O'Grady 0-6, D O'Sullivan 0-2, D Walsh 0-1, L Carey 0-1, G Sayers 0-1.

=== Relegation playoff ===
30 November 2013 Playoff	Kilcummin	0-13 - 0-08	Finuge	Strand Road
	I Devane 0-4, DJ Fleming 0-3, K Murphy 0-2, K McCarthy 0-1, G O'Leary 0-1, Sweeney 0-1, J O'Sullivan 0-1.		M Corridan 0-2, P Corridan 0-2, F Fitzmaurice 0-1,

=== Round 3 ===
13 July 2013 Round 3	St. Kieran's	2-13 - 1-12	West Kerry	Páirc an Aghasaigh
	E Walsh 0-5, EJ O'Donoghue 1-1, A Breen 1-1, T Hickey 0-3, S O'Connor 0-1, J Walsh 0-1, P O'Connor 0-1.		A Fitzgerald 1-4, SM Ó Conchúir 0-3, S Hennessy 0-2, D Ó Súilleabháin 0-2, E Kennedy 0-1.

13 July 2013 Round 3	Feale Rangers	1-13 - 0-13	Dingle	Páirc an Aghasaigh
	P Curtin 1-4, C Cox 0-7, N O'Connor 0-2.		M Evans 0-7, B Kelliher 0-3, C Bambury 0-1, J O'Sullivan 0-1, M Geaney 0-1.

14 July 2013 Round 3	Milltown/Castlemaine	1-11 - 0-09	Laune Rangers	Páirc de Búrca
	S Murphy 1-1, C Moriarty 0-3, I Twiss 0-3, M Burke 0-1, P Wren 0-1, D Kelliher 0-1, D Twiss 0-1.		MF Russell 0-6, S McSweeney 0-2, K Flynn 0-1.

14 July 2013 Round 3	Dr. Crokes	3-13 - 1-15	East Kerry	Fitzgerald Stadium
	C Cooper 1-6, B Looney 1-2, K O'Leary 1-1, S Foley 0-1, D Casey 0-1, A O'Sullivan 0-1, G O'Shea 0-1.		L Murphy 1-8, DJ O'Connor 0-3, J Sherwood 0-1, M O'Donoghue 0-1, R O'Carroll 0-1, F Coffey 0-1.

14 July 2013 Round 3	Austin Stacks	2-16 - 1-05	St. Michaels/Foilmore	Con Keating Park
	S Carroll 1-4, W Guthrie 1-0, C O'Connell 0-2, P O'Donoghue 0-2, D Mannix 0-2, D Long 0-2, D Mcelligott 0-1, B Shanahan 0-1, K Donaghy 0-1, P McCarthy 0-1.		E O'Connor 0-4, B Smith 1-0, P King 0-1.

14 July 2013 Round 3	St. Brendan's	1-17 - 2-07	Killarney Legion	FitzGerald Stadium
	D Culloty 1-1, J Moriarty 0-4, D Carmody 0-4, D O'Callaghan 0-3, J Dowling 0-2, A O'Donoghue 0-1, M Brennan 0-1, D Wallace 0-1.		D O'Sullivan 1-2, D McCarthy 1-1, C Keane 0-2, S Keane 0-1, S McCarthy 0-1.

14 July 2013 Round 3	Kerins O'Rahilly's	2-09 - 1-10	South Kerry	Con Keating Park
	J Savage 1-3, K O'Mahony 1-0, D Quill 0-3, BJ Walsh 0-3.		B Sheehan 0-5, T Curran 1-0, A Walsh 0-3, P O'Donoghue 0-2.

- Rathmore received a bye in this round.

=== Quarter-finals ===
21 September 2013 Quarter-final	Kerins O'Rahilly's	1-15 - 0-12	Milltown/Castlemaine	FitzGerald Stadium
	BJ Keane 0-5, BJ Walsh 1-1, D Quill 0-4, J Savage 0-2, D Moran 0-1, J Ferguson 0-1, K O'Mahony 0-1.		D Twiss 0-7, I Twiss 0-2, M Mangan 0-1, P Carroll 0-1, D Kelleher 0-1.

28 September 2013 Quarter-final	Dr. Crokes	3-16 - 0-09	Rathmore	FitzGerald Stadium
	D Casey 1-2, A O'Sullivan 1-2, C Cooper 0-4, A O'Donovan 1-0, B Looney 0-3, C Brady 0-2, K O'Leary 0-1, J Doolan 0-1, G O'Shea 0-1.		J Moynihan 0-2, D O'Sullivan 0-2, S Ryan 0-2, M Reen 0-1, J O'Keeffe 0-1.

29 September 2013 Quarter-final	Austin Stacks	2-12 - 1-10	St. Kieran's	Austin Stack Park
	S Carroll 1-5, D Long 1-3, G Horan 0-1, M Collins 0-1, K Donaghy 0-1, P McCarthy 0-1.		E Walsh 1-6, EJ O'Donoghue 0-2, S Scanlon 0-1, J Walsh 0-1.

29 September 2013 Quarter-final	Feale Rangers	3-12 - 0-15 (aet)	St. Brendan's	Austin Stack Park
	C Cox 0-10, P Curtin 1-0, D Walsh 1-0, D Sheehy 1-0, P Quille 0-1, D McCarthy 0-1.		D Carmody 0-5, D O'Callaghan 0-3, L Mulligan 0-3, M Griffin 0-1, K Hurley 0-1, K Fitzgerald 0-1, M Ferris 0-1.

=== Semi-finals ===
6 October 2013 Semi-final	Dr. Crokes	0-14 - 0-04	Kerins O'Rahilly's	Austin Stack Park
	B Looney 0-4, D Casey 0-3, C Cooper 0-3, K O'Leary 0-2, K Ward 0-1, E Brosnan 0-1.		K Walshe 0-1, D Quill 0-1, BJ Keane 0-1, J Savage 0-1.

6 October 2013 Semi-final	Austin Stacks	3-12 - 0-03	Feale Rangers	Austin Stack Park
	S Carroll 0-6, P McCarthy 1-1, R Shanahan 1-0, D O'Brien 1-0, P O'Donoghue 0-1, M Collins 0-1, D Long 0-1, S Callaghan 0-1, D Mannix 0-1.		C Cox 0-3.

=== Final ===
20 October 2013 Final	Dr. Crokes	4-16 - 0-12	Austin Stacks	Fitzgerald Stadium
	C Cooper 1-4 (2fs), K O'Leary 1-4, D Casey 1-2 (1f), C Brady 1-1, J Buckley 0-2, B Looney, K Ward, J Doolan 0-1 each.	Report	S Carroll 0-5 (4fs), B Shanahan 0-2, P O'Donoghue, S Callaghan, F McNamara, D Mannix, G Horan 0-1 each.

== Championship statistics ==
=== Top scorers ===
Overall

Rank	Player	Club	Tally	Total	Matches	Average
1	Shane Carroll	Austin Stacks	2-26	32	5	6.40
2	Conor Cox	Feale Rangers	0-30	30	4	7.50
3	Colm Cooper	Dr. Crokes	2-22	28	5	5.60
4	Liam Murphy	East Kerry	1-23	26	3	8.66
5	Kieran O'Leary	Dr. Crokes	1-23	26	5	5.20
6	Edmund Walsh	St. Kieran's	1-17	20	3	6.66
7	Ian Twiss	Milltown/Castlemaine	2-13	19	3	6.33
7	Stephen O'Brien	Kenmare	2-13	19	2	9.50
9	Barry John Keane	Kerins O'Rahilly's	0-17	17	4	4.25
10	David O'Callaghan	St. Brendan's	0-15	15	4	3.75

In a single game

Rank	Player	Club	Tally	Total	Opposition
1	Ian Twiss	Milltown/Castlemaine	2-08	14	St. Brendan's
2	Liam Murphy	East Kerry	1-08	11	Dr. Crokes
3	Stephen O'Brien	Kenmare	1-07	10	East Kerry
3	Conor Cox	Feale Rangers	0-10	10	Mid Kerry
3	Conor Cox	Feale Rangers	0-10	10	St. Brendan's
6	Michael Geaney	Dingle	1-06	9	Kenmare
6	Stephen O'Brien	Kenmare	1-06	9	Dingle
6	Colm Cooper	Dr. Crokes	1-06	9	East Kerry
6	Edmund Walsh	St. Kieran's	1-06	9	Austin Stacks
6	Liam Murphy	East Kerry	0-09	9	Kenmare

=== Miscellaneous ===
- Dr. Crokes became the first club since John Mitchels in 1962 to win four titles in-a-row.
- Finuge made their first appearance at senior level.
