= 2012 Kerry Senior Football Championship =

Gaelic football competition

- Dates: 16 June - 28 October 2012
- Teams: 20
- Sponsor: Garvey's SuperValu
- Champions: Dr. Crokes (9th title); Kieran O'Leary (captain); Noel O'Leary (manager)
- Runners-up: Dingle; Brendan Kelliher (captain); Murt Moriarty (manager)
- Relegated: Gneeveguilla

Tournament statistics
- Matches played: 30
- Goals scored: 62 (2.07 per match)
- Points scored: 686 (22.87 per match)
- Top scorer(s): Colm Cooper (5-21)

The 2012 Kerry Senior Football Championship was the 112th staging of the Kerry Senior Football Championship since its establishment by the Kerry County Board in 1889. The championship ran from 16 June to 28 October 2012.

Dr. Crokes entered the championship as the defending champions in search of a third successive title.

The final was played on 28 October 2012 at FitzGerald Stadium in Killarney, between Dr. Crokes and Dingle in what was their first ever meeting in the final. Dr. Crokes won the match by 2–13 to 0–8 to claim their ninth championship title overall and a third title in succession.

Colm Cooper was the championship's top scorer with 5-21.

== Team changes ==
=== To Championship ===
Promoted from the Kerry Intermediate Football Championship

- Milltown/Castlemaine

=== From Championship ===
Relegated to the Kerry Intermediate Football Championship

- Ardfert

== Results ==
=== Round 1 ===
16 June 2012 Round 1	Kenmare	0-16 - 0-15 (aet)	St. Brendan's	Austin Stack Park
	P O'Connor 0-8, T Morley 0-2, MT O'Sullivan 0-2, S O'Leary 0-1, M Crowley 0-1, S Cremin 0-1, J Spillane 0-1.		D O'Callaghan 0-7, M Griffin 0-4, A O'Donoghue 0-2, B Costello 0-1, D Wallace 0-1.

12 June 2012 Round 1	Austin Stacks	1-14 - 1-11 (aet)	St. Kieran's	Austin Stack Park
	D Long 0-4, D Clifford 1-0, K Donaghy 0-2, M Collins 0-2, S Carroll 0-2, D Bohane 0-1, S O'Callaghan 0-1, D Mannix 0-1, D O'Brien 0-1.		T McGoldrick 1-5, E Walsh 0-2, J Walsh 0-1, S Scanlon 0-1, T Hickey 0-1, P Reidy 0-1.

16 June 2012 Round 1	Milltown/Castlemaine	0-11 - 0-10	East Kerry	J. P. O'Sullivan Park
	C Moriarty 0-2, S Murphy 0-2, D Kelliher 0-2, C Kerins 0-2, J O'Connor 0-1, D Twiss 0-1, P Carroll 0-1.		J O'Donoghue 0-5, M O'Donoghue 0-3, J Sherwood 0-1, D Aherne 0-1.

16 June 2013 Round 1	St. Michaels/Foilmore	0-08 - 5-13	Dr Crokes	Ballinskelligs Grounds
	E O'Connor 0-4, J Clifford 0-3, S Fogarty 0-1.		C Cooper 4-6, G O'Shea 1-2, B Looney 0-3, K O'Leary 0-1, J Doolan 0-1.

16 June 2012 Round 1	Laune Rangers	2-16 - 0-12	Shannon Rangers	J. P. O'Sullivan Park
	MF Russell 0-9, J O'Connor 1-3, G Mahony 1-0, C O'Shea 0-2, C Riordan 0-1, P Sheehan 0-1.		M Boyle 0-4, G O'Sullivan 0-4, J King 0-2, T Joy 0-1, E Mangan 0-1.

17 June 2012 Round 1	Rathmore	0-10 - 1-10	South Kerry	Rathbeg Grounds
	M O'Riordan 0-3, G O'Keeffe 0-2, D O'Sullivan 0-1, J Moynihan 0-1, A O'Mahony 0-1, P Reen 0-1, A Lawlor 0-1.		T Curran 1-2, Declan O'Sullivan 0-2, P O'Donoghue 0-2, D Daly 0-2, A O'Sullivan 0-1, N O'Shea 0-1.

17 June 2013 Round 1	Killarney Legion	1-14 - 1-07	Mid Kerry	FitzGerald Stadium
	J O'Donoghue 0-6, T Moriarty 1-2, C Keane 0-4, D O'Sullivan 0-1, D Sheehan 0-1.		L Sheehan 1-2, G Sayers 0-4, C McGillycuddy 0-1.

17 June 2012 Round 1	Feale Rangers	0-13 - 0-10	West Kerry	Páirc an Aghasaigh
	P Curtin 0-5, D Walsh 0-2, M O'Connor 0-2, N Kennelly 0-2, A Maher 0-1, C Cox 0-1.		J Hickson 0-4, J Crean 0-3, S Hennessy 0-2, JB Spillane 0-1.

17 June 2012 Round 1	Kerins O'Rahilly's	1-12 - 2-08	Kilcummin	FitzGerald Stadium
	BJ Keane 1-3, D Quill 0-5, JC O'Connor 0-1, R Molloy 0-1, J Savage 0-1, D Flaherty 0-1.		J Fleming 1-5, I Devane 1-0, M McCarthy 0-1, C O'Leary 0-1, K Gorman 0-1.

17 June 2012 Round 1	Dingle	1-15 - 0-09	Gneeveguilla	Páirc an Aghasaigh
	D Geaney 1-4, P Geaney 0-4, J Sheehy 0-2, G Curran 0-1, P Devane 0-1, D Devane 0-1, M Geaney 0-1, B O'Connell 0-1.		M MUrphy 0-3, JP Brosnan 0-2, L Murphy 0-1, R McAuliffe 0-1, P O'Connor 0-1, P Doyle 0-1.

=== Round 2 ===
22 June 2012 Round 2	St. Michaels/Foilmore	3-12 - 1-17 (aet)	St. Brendan's	Blennerville Grounds
	E O'Connor 1-3, R O'Connor 1-1, J Clifford 1-1, B Kelly 0-2, B Galvin 0-1, A O'Connell 0-1, S Fogarty 0-1, D O'Sullivan 0-1, D Kelly 0-1		D O'Callaghan 0-6, M Brennan 1-1, D Culloty 0-3, J Moriarty 0-2, A O'Donoghue 0-2, C Fitzgerald 0-2, L Poff 0-1.

23 June 2012 Round 2	Rathmore	0-12 - 0-06	Mid Kerry	Beaufort Grounds
	J Moynihan 0-3, D O'Sullivan 0-3, P Reen 0-1, M O'Riordan 0-1, M Reen 0-1, J O'Sullivan 0-1, G O'Keeffe 0-1, B O'Keeffe 0-1.		G Sayers 0-2, C McGillycuddy 0-1, Darran O'Sullivan 0-1, F Courtney 0-1, T O'Sullivan 0-1.

23 June 2012 Round 2	Kilcummin	0-16 - 0-14	Shannon Rangers	Tarbert Grounds
	DJ Fleming 0-5, K Murphy 0-4, M McCarthy 0-2, K Gorman 0-1, S McSweeney 0-1, G O'Leary 0-1, C O'Leary 0-1, J Devane 0-1.		G O'Sullivan 0-4, M Boyle 0-4, E Mangan 0-3, PJ Connoly 0-2, PJ Connolly 0-2, T Joy 0-1.

24 June 2012 Round 2	St. Kieran's	1-17 - 1-16 (aet)	West Kerry	Ballymacelligott Grounds
	E Walsh 1-6, T McGoldrick 0-6, A Breen 0-2, T Hickey 0-1, EJ O'Donoghue 0-1, P O'Connor 0-1.		C O'Sullivan 0-9, J Crean 1-1, J Hickson 0-3, T Ó Sé 0-1, E Mac Gearailt 0-1, T Cavanagh 0-1.

24 June 2013 Round 2	East Kerry	0-18 - 0-07	Gneeveguilla	FitzGerald Stadium
	M O'Donoghue 0-7, N O'Mahony 0-5, D Ahern 0-2, J O'Donoghue 0-2, C O'Shea 0-1, J O'Leary 0-1.		L Murphy 0-3, P Cremin 0-1, D O'Connor 0-1, P O'Connor 0-1, JP Brosnan 0-1.

=== Round 3 ===
1 September 2012 Round 3	South Kerry	0-07 - 1-09	Austin Stacks	Con Keating Park
	B Sheehan 0-3, Declan O'Sullivan 0-2, Daniel O'Sullivan 0-1, B O'Sullivan 0-1.		D O'Brien 1-3, P McCarthy 0-1, P O'Donoghue 0-1, K Donaghy 0-1, S Carroll 0-1, S O'Callaghan 0-1, D Mannix 0-1.

1 September 2012 Round 3	Laune Rangers	2-09 - 0-08	Milltown/Castlemaine	J. P. O'Sullivan Park
	K Doona 1-1, MF Russell 0-4, S McSweeney 1-0, P Joy 0-3, L Hassett 0-1.		D Twiss 0-3, I Twiss 0-2, M Mangan 0-1, C Moriarty 0-1, J Flynn 0-1.

8 September 2012 Round 3	Kilcummin	0-11 - 5-05	Dingle	Kilcummin Grounds
	DJ Fleming 0-5, B Kealy 0-1, S McSweeney 0-1, K Gorman 0-1, M McCarthy 0-1, D O'Leary 0-1, K McCarthy 0-1.		B O'Connor 3-0, P Geaney 1-4, M Evans 1-0, CB Moriarty 0-1.

8 September 2012 Round 3	St. Kieran's	2-11 - 0-14	Kerins O'Rahilly's	Ballymacelligott Grounds
	A Breen 2-1, E Walsh 0-3, T McGoldrick 0-2, J Walsh 0-2, EJ O'Donoghue 0-2, T Hickey 0-1.		B Keane 0-9, BJ Walsh 0-3, M Quirke 0-1, K O'Mahony 0-1.

9 September 2012 Round 3	Rathmore	1-12 - 2-05	Killarney Legion	FitzGerald Stadium
	J Buckley 1-3, M O'Riordan 0-6, G O'Keeffe 0-1, M Reen 0-1, B O'Keeffe 0-1.		C Keane 1-3, T Moriarty 1-0, K Slattery 0-1, J O'Donoghue 0-1,.

9 September 2012 Round 3	Dr. Crokes	1-15 - 1-09	East Kerry	FitzGerald Stadium
	B Looney 0-4, K O'Leary 1-0, C Cooper 0-3, D Casey 0-2, J Buckley 0-2, A Kenneally 0-1, J Doolan 0-1, A O'Donovan 0-1, L Quinn 0-1.		M O'Donoghue 0-4, J Sherwood 1-0, J O'Donoghue 0-2, N O'Mahony 0-1, C O'Shea 0-1, M Daly 0-1.

8 September 2012 Round 3	St. Michaels/Foilmore	1-12 - 0-15 (aet)	Kenmare	Gortmore Grounds
	J Clifford 1-1, E O'Connor 0-2, R O'Connor 0-2, D Kelly 0-2, B Kelly 0-2, S Fogarty 0-2, M Griffin 0-1.		L O'Shea 0-5, S O'Brien 0-4, DJ Brennan 0-3, A O'Sullivan 0-1, MT O'Sullivan 0-1, G Crowley 0-1.

22 September 2012 Round 3 replay	Kenmare	2-15 - 3-08	St. Michaels/Foilmore	Templenoe Grounds
	M Crowley 2-0, P O'Connor 0-4, S O'Brien 0-3, A Spillane 0-3, L O'Shea 0-2, C Brosnan 0-1, J Spillane 0-1, B Crowley 0-1.		E O'Connor 0-5, J Clifford 1-1, Dara O'Sullivan 1-0, M McCarthy 1-0, B Kelly 0-1, S O'Connor 0-1.

- Feale Rangers received a bye in this round.

=== Quarter-finals ===
29 September 2012 Quarter-final	Laune Rangers	3-13 - 2-04	Rathmore	FitzGerald Stadium
	MF Russell 1-5, K Doona 1-1, G O'Mahony 1-0, T McGillycuddy 0-2, S McSweeney 0-2, P Joy 0-2, P Crowley 0-1.		E Lawlor 1-2, J Buckley 1-0, M O'Riordan 0-2.

29 September 2012 Quarter-final	Dingle	2-11 - 1-13	Feale Rangers	Austin Stack Park
	B O'Connor 2-0, P Geaney 0-6, J Sheehy 0-2, D Geaney 0-1, B Kelliher 0-1, P Devane 0-1, R Begley 0-1.		C Cox 1-8, P Curtin 0-3, N Kennelly 0-2.

29 September 2012 Quarter-final	St. Kieran's	1-21 - 2-12	Kenmare	Fitzgerald Stadium
	EJ O'Donoghue 1-5, E Walsh 0-3, T McGoldrick 0-3, M Hickey 0-2, J Walsh 0-2, T Hickey 0-2, J Buckley 0-1, A Breen 0-1, M Coakley 0-1, S Scanlon 0-1.		S O'Brien 1-2, P O'Connor 0-4, L O'Shea 1-0, DJ Brennan 0-2 M Crowley 0-2, A O'Sullivan 0-1, S O'Leary 0-1.

30 September 2012 Quarter-final	Dr. Crokes	1-13 - 0-08	Austin Stacks	Austin Stack Park
	C Cooper 1-4, B Looney 0-3, J Doolan 0-3, D Casey 0-1, K O'Leary 0-1, G O'Shea 0-1.		D Mannix 0-3, S O'Carroll 0-2, D O'Brien 0-2, K Donaghy 0-1.

=== Semi-finals ===
14 October 2012 Semi-final	Dr. Crokes	0-14 - 1-03	Laune Rangers	Austin Stack Park
	C Cooper 0-5, D Casey 0-4, K O'Leary 0-2, C Brady 0-1, E Brosnan 0-1, G O'Shea 0-1.		S McSweeney 1-0, P Joy 0-2, MF Russell 0-1.

14 October 2012 Semi-final	Dingle	4-05 - 0-14	St. Kieran's	Austin Stack Park
	P Geaney 1-4, M Geaney 1-0, D Geaney 1-0, B O'Connor 1-0, J Sheehy 0-1.		E Walsh 0-4, J Walsh 0-3, T McGoldrick 0-1, M Coakley 0-1, EJ O'Donoghue 0-1, T Hickey 0-1, S Scanlon 0-1, P O'Connor 0-1, P Reidy 0-1.

=== Final ===
28 October 2012 Final	Dr. Crokes	2-13 - 0-08	Dingle	Fitzgerald Stadium
	B Looney 1-3, C Brady 1-0, C Cooper 0-3, K O'Leary 0-2, A O'Donovan 0-1, L Quinn 0-1, J Doolan 0-1, D Casey 0-1, G O'Shea 0-1.		P Geaney 0-4, M Geaney 0-2, J Sheehy 0-1, D Geaney 0-1.

== Championship statistics ==
=== Top scorers ===
Overall

Rank	Player	Club	Tally	Total	Matches	Average
1	Colm Cooper	Dr. Crokes	5-21	36	5	7.20
2	Paul Geaney	Dingle	2-22	28	5	5.60
3	Mike Frank Russell	Laune Rangers	1-19	22	4	5.50
4	Edmund Walsh	St. Kieran's	1-18	21	5	4.20
5	Tom McGoldrick	St. Kieran's	1-17	20	5	4.00
6	Billy O'Connor	Dingle	6-01	19	5	3.80
7	D. J. Fleming	Kilcummin	1-15	18	3	6.00
8	Éanna O'Connor	Kilcummin	1-14	17	4	4.25
9	Brian Looney	Dr. Crokes	1-13	16	5	3.20
9	Paul O'Connor	Kenmare	0-16	16	4	4.00

In a single game

Rank	Player	Club	Tally	Total	Opposition
1	Colm Cooper	Dr. Crokes	4-06	18	St Michael's/Foilmore
2	Conor Cox	Feale Rangers	1-08	11	Dingle
3	Billy O'Connor	Dingle	3-00	9	Kilcummin
3	Edmund Walsh	St. Kieran's	1-06	9	West Kerry
3	Mike Frank Russell	Laune Rangers	0-09	9	Shannon Rangers
3	Cathal O'Sullivan	West Kerry	0-09	9	St. Kieran's
3	Barry John Keane	Kerins O'Rahilly's	0-09	9	St. Kieran's
8	Tom McGoldrick	St. Kieran's	1-05	8	Austin Stacks
8	D. J. Fleming	Kilcummin	1-05	8	Kerins O'Rahilly's
8	Mike Frank Russell	Laune Rangers	1-05	8	Rathmore
8	E. J. O'Donoghue	St. Kieran's	1-05	8	Kenmare
8	Paul O'Connor	Kenmare	0-08	8	St. Brendan's

=== Miscellaneous ===
- Dr. Crokes became the first team since South Kerry between 2004–06 to win three titles in-a-row.
- Dingle qualified for the final for the first time since 1948.
