= Colm Cooper =

Kerry Gaelic footballer

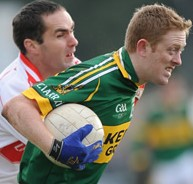

Personal information
- Nickname: The Gooch
- Born: 3 June 1983 (age 43) Killarney, County Kerry, Ireland
- Occupation: Bank official (AIB)
- Height: 1.83 m (6 ft 0 in)

Sport
- Sport: Gaelic Football
- Position: Right corner-forward
Club
- Years: Club
- 2000–present: Dr Crokes
Club titles
- Kerry titles: 8
- Munster titles: 6
- All-Ireland Titles: 1
Inter-county*
Years	County	Apps (scores)
2002–2017	Kerry	85 (23–283)
Inter-county titles
- Munster titles: 9
- All-Irelands: 5
- NFL: 4
- All Stars: 8
- *Inter County team apps and scores correct as of 16:45, 4 April 2017.

Colm "the Gooch" Cooper (born 3 June 1983) is an Irish Gaelic footballer whose league and championship career at senior level with the Kerry county team spanned fifteen years from 2002 to 2017.

Born in Killarney, County Kerry, The Gooch Cooper was born into a strong Gaelic football family. His father, Mike Cooper, had a strong involvement with the Dr Crokes club, serving as a minor and junior selector. Colm's nephew Mark was a part of the 2018 All Ireland winning Kerry Minor team, a competition he couldn't win.

Cooper played competitive Gaelic football as a student at St Brendan's College; however, his tenure coincided with a downturn in fortunes for the college. He first appeared for the Dr. Crokes club at underage levels, before making his debut with the senior team in 2000. An All-Ireland medal winners with the club in 2017, Cooper has also won five Munster medals and six county senior championship medals.

Cooper made his debut on the inter-county scene at the age of seventeen when he was selected for the Kerry minor team in 2000. He enjoyed one championship season with the minor team, culminating with the winning of a Munster medal in 2001. Cooper subsequently joined the Kerry under-21 team, winning a Munster medal in 2002. By this stage he had also joined the Kerry senior team, making his debut during the 2002 league. Over the course of the next fifteen years, Cooper won five All-Ireland medals, beginning with a lone triumph in 2004, back-to-back championships in 2006 and 2007, a fourth title in 2009 and a final championship as a non-playing substitute in 2014 due to injury. He also won nine Munster medals, three National Football League medals and was named Texaco Footballer of the Year in 2004. He played his last game for Kerry against Dublin in August 2016 before announcing his retirement from inter-county football on 4 April 2017.

After being chosen on the Munster inter-provincial team for the first time in 2002, Cooper was also included on the team in 2004. He ended his career without a Railway Cup medal.

Cooper was first selected for the Ireland international rules football team in 2005, however, he declined to be included on subsequent squads for the competition.

Cooper released his autobiography called Gooch The Autobiography in October 2017. On 27 October 2017, Cooper became the first GAA player to have a testimonial dinner which was held at the Intercontinental Hotel in Ballsbridge.

== Playing career ==
=== Club ===
Cooper helped Dr Crokes win the 2000 Kerry Senior Football Championship at the age of 17, beating An Ghaeltacht in the final.

Dr Crokes reached the Kerry Senior county final again in 2005 and 2006, but were defeated on both occasions by South Kingdom. However, South Kingdom are a divisional side and not a club so Dr Crokes qualified to represent the Kerry in the Munster Senior Club Football Championship. In 2006 Dr Crokes won the Munster Club Championship, beating The Nire of Waterford in the final. They advanced to the All-Ireland Senior Club Football Championship after beating Moorefield of Kildare after a replay in the semi-final, and faced Crossmaglen of Armagh in the 2007 All-Ireland Club final. The game finished in a draw. Crossmaglen won the replay to claim their fourth All-Ireland title. In 2010 Cooper played against Austin Stacks in Tralee in the Championship final finally giving Dr Crokes the title after the three losses in finals. Cooper and Crokes were back again the year after to win back to back county titles. They secured the Kerry title in 2011, 2012 and 2013 to make it five in a row.

In February 2014, Cooper suffered a cruciate ligament rupture in the All-Ireland Club Championship semi-final against Castlebar Mitchels which kept him out of action for the remainder of 2014. On 27 November 2016, Cooper won his fifth Munster club title beating the Nire in the final by 3-15 to 0-6 with Cooper scoring two points. Dr Crokes went on to reach the 2017 All-Ireland Senior Club Football Final on 17 March 2017 and won the game against Slaughtneil by 1-9 to 1-7 at Croke Park. Cooper scored 1-2 in the final and claimed his first All-Ireland Senior Club Football Championship title.

=== Inter-county ===
Cooper was first called up to the Kingdom team in 2002 and made his National Football League debut against Laois. He continued his rise in that year's Championship, making his debut against Limerick on 12 May en route to the 2002 All-Ireland final, where they faced Armagh. Armagh defeated Kerry in the final by 1-12 to 0-14 with Cooper scoring a point. Cooper was awarded his first All Star award in 2002.

In 2003 Kerry won a Munster Senior Football Championship, but were knocked out of the All-Ireland Championship by Tyrone at the semi-final stage losing by 0-13 to 0-6.

2004 proved to be a good year for Cooper. Kerry won the 2004 National League, with victory over Galway in the final on 2 May. They also defended their Munster title, before going on to win the All-Ireland Championship – beating Mayo in the final by 1-20 to 2-9. Cooper scored 1–05 in the final, including a goal where he caught a ball and ran at the Mayo defence before slotting the ball low to the net. Cooper received his second All Star in 2004 and was named the Texaco Footballer of the Year.

Kerry won their third consecutive Munster Championship in 2005, beating old rivals Cork in the decider. Kerry reached an All-Ireland final, this time against Tyrone. After a bright start, Cooper was injured in a clash with Tyrone goalkeeper Pascal McConnell which limited his involvement. Tyrone won the game 1–16 to 2–10. Cooper won a third All Star award in 2005.

In the 2006 Championship Cork defeated Kerry in the Munster final. Kerry advanced to the All-Ireland final, where they once again met Mayo. Kerry won the game by 13 points and Cooper was again one of Kerry's main contributors scoring 1–02. He was the Kerry captain for part of that year, although the other captain Declan O'Sullivan was restored as captain for the All-Ireland final. After winning the game, the Sam Maguire Cup was lifted by both O' Sullivan and Cooper.

In 2007 Cooper played with Kerry regaining their Munster Championship title after an enthralling game against Cork, which Kerry won 1–15 to 1–13. Having been quiet for long spells, he burst into life and in a five-minute period scored 1–02. After beating Dublin by two points in the semi-final, Kerry progressed to face their bitter rivals Cork in the first ever all-Munster All-Ireland final. Kerry comfortably beat Cork 3–13 to 1–09, to become the first team to retain the title since Cork themselves 17 years before. Cooper got the goal that put Kerry in the driving seat, rising to fist the ball over the onrushing Alan Quirke. Cooper finished the game with 1-05. He received his fourth All Star and was nominated as one of three contenders for 2007 Footballer of the Year. He was also named on the GPA Team of the Year.

Kerry reached the 2008 National League final, but were beaten by Derry on a 2-13 to 2-9 scoreline. Cork beat Kerry in the 2008 Munster final. Kerry nevertheless advanced to the 2008 All-Ireland final, to face Tyrone for the third time in six years. Tyrone once again came out on top winning by four points. Cooper scored six points in the final and won his fifth All Star award that year and was once again named on the GPA Team of the Year.

In 2009, Cooper was dropped from the starting Kerry 15 for the qualifier game against Antrim on 26 July, due to a breach of team discipline. Cooper came on against Antrim and made an immediate impact notching 4 frees in another win for Kerry. Kerry progressed to face Dublin in the quarter final on 3 August, a Dublin side who had won their fifth Leinster Championships in a row. Within a minute Cooper had Kerry in front with a goal and were 1–13 to 0–03 ahead at the break. The game ended with Kerry on top and Cooper silently announcing his return to form with a haul of 1–08. Cooper and Kerry brushed Meath aside in a low-key semi-final before they faced against Cork in the final. Kerry won the final 0–16 to 1–09, with Cooper scoring six points and winning his fourth All Ireland Medal.

In April 2010, Cooper sustained a serious eye injury in an NFL Division 1 win over Monaghan. He tore a duct in one of his eyes: doctors in Kerry expressed concern about his condition. He collided with Monaghan defender Darren Hughes after seven minutes and required treatment on and off the field. However, he returned to the Kerry team for the championship. After winning the Munster Championship, beating Limerick in the final, Kerry progressed to the All-Ireland quarter final, facing historic rivals Down but lost by 1-16 to 1-10 with Cooper scoring seven points in the game.

The 2011 championship ended in final day disappointment for Cooper. Kerry, in control of the final having been 4 points up in the closing minutes, succumbed to rivals Dublin, who outscored Kerry by 1–3 to 1 point in the final stages to win the cup for the first time since 1995.

The 2012 championship saw Kerry lose to Cork in the Munster semi-final but go on to play Donegal in the All-Ireland quarter-final on 5 August. Kerry lost the game by 1-12 to 1-10 with Cooper scoring four points.

Kerry won the Munster Championship in 2013 with Cooper getting 1-3 in the final on 7 July at Fitzgerald Stadium. Kerry defeated Cavan in the All-Ireland quarter-finals before losing to Dublin in the semi-final by 3-18 to 3-11 with Cooper scoring four points in the game.

In February 2014, Cooper suffered a cruciate ligament rupture in the All-Ireland Club Championship semi-final against Castlebar Mitchels which kept him out of action for most of 2014. He was named as a substitute for Kerry in the 2014 All-Ireland Final against Donegal which Kerry went on to win by 2-9 to 0-12.

Cooper won his eight Munster Championship medal on 18 July 2015 when Kerry defeated Cork in the final by 1-11 to 1-6 after a replay. They defeated Kildare in the All-Ireland quarter-finals by 7-16 to 0-10 with Cooper getting 2-3 before defeating Tyrone in the semi-final by 0-18 to 1-11, Cooper getting two points. In the final against Dublin on 20 September, Cooper scored didn't get on the score sheet as Kerry lost by 0-9 to 0-12 in very wet conditions.

In 2016, Kerry reached the Munster Final again and played Tipperary, winning by 3-17 to 2-10. Cooper went off injured in the first half of the game with a collarbone injury. He missed the quarter final win against Clare but returned for the epic semi-final against Dublin on 28 August. Dublin won by 0-22 to 2-14 after coming back from conceding two first half goals. Cooper scored five points in what would turn out to be his last game for Kerry.

On the 4 April 2017, Cooper announced his retirement from inter county football at the age of 33. In 85 Championship games for Kerry he scored 23 goals and 283 points, and in 60 league games he scored 12 goals and 165 points.

=== International rules ===
Cooper has represented Ireland in the International Rules Series, in 2005. However, he has declined any invitation to represent Ireland in the hybrid game since, as he claims not to have enjoyed the experience; 2005 was a year when the series was marred by violence and intimidation.

=== Province ===
Cooper played for Munster in the Railway Cup in 2002 and 2004.

== Career statistics ==
=== Club ===
Team	Season	Kerr		Munster		All-Ireland		Total	
Team	Season	Apps	Score	Apps	Score	Apps	Score	Apps	Score
Dr. Crokes	2000–01	4	1-01	—		—		4	1-01
Dr. Crokes	2001–02	3	0-05	—		—		3	0-05
Dr. Crokes	2002–03	3	0-06	—		—		3	0-06
Dr. Crokes	2003–04	2	1-11	—		—		2	1-11
Dr. Crokes	2004–05	3	3-21	—		—		3	3-21
Dr. Crokes	2005–06	5	5-19	—		—		5	5-19
Dr. Crokes	2006–06	4	2-11	2	3-05	5	3-18	11	8-34
Dr. Crokes	2007–08	3	1-14	—		—		3	1-14
Dr. Crokes	2008–09	3	2-10	—		—		3	2-10
Dr. Crokes	2009–10	5	4-10	—		—		5	4-10
Dr. Crokes	2010–11	5	4-27	3	2-08	—		8	6-35
Dr. Crokes	2011–12	5	2-10	3	2-11	1	0-03	9	4-24
Dr. Crokes	2012–13	5	5-21	3	1-12	2	0-06	10	6-39
Dr. Crokes	2013–14	5	2-22	3	1-07	1	0-02	9	3-31
Dr. Crokes	2014–15	0	0-00	—		—		0	0-00
Dr. Crokes	2015–16	3	2-09	—		—		3	2-09
Dr. Crokes	2016–17	5	1-18	3	1-08	2	1-03	10	3-29
Dr. Crokes	2017–18	5	4-14	2	0-12	—		7	4-26
Dr. Crokes	2018–19	5	0-09	3	0-04	2	0-01	10	0-14
Career total		73	39-238	22	10-67	13	4-33	108	53-338

== Honours ==
Dr Crokes

- All-Ireland Senior Club Football Championship (1): 2016-17
- Munster Senior Club Football Championship (5): 2006, 2011, 2012, 2013, 2016
- Kerry Senior Football Championship (8): 2000, 2010, 2011, 2012, 2013, 2016, 2017, 2018

Kerry

- All-Ireland Senior Football Championship (5): 2004, 2006, 2007, 2009, 2014
- Munster Senior Football Championship (9): 2003, 2004, 2005, 2007, 2010, 2011 (c), 2013 (c), 2015, 2016
- National Football League Division 1 (3): 2004, 2006, 2009
- National Football League Division 2 (1): 2002
- Munster Under-21 Football Championship (1): 2002
- Munster Minor Football Championship (1): 2001

AIB Kerry

- All Ireland Interfirm Senior Football Championship (1): 2007
- Munster Interfirm Senior Football Championship (3): 2004, 2005, 2007
- Kerry Interfirm Senior Football Championship (4) 2004, 2005, 2007, 2008

Individual

- All Stars Awards (8) 2002, 2004, 2005, 2007, 2008, 2010, 2011, 2013.
- Texaco Footballer of the Year (1) 2004
- The Munster Football team of the last 25 years
