= 2011 Kerry Senior Football Championship =

Gaelic football competition

- Dates: 10 June - 30 October 2011
- Teams: 20
- Sponsor: Garvey's SuperValu
- Champions: Dr. Crokes (8th title); Luke Quinn (captain); Harry O'Neill (manager)
- Runners-up: Mid Kerry; Colm Kerins (captain); Tim Coffey (manager)
- Relegated: Ardfert

Tournament statistics
- Matches played: 31
- Goals scored: 50 (1.61 per match)
- Points scored: 641 (20.68 per match)
- Top scorer(s): David Geaney (1-23)

The 2011 Kerry Senior Football Championship was the 111th staging of the Kerry Senior Football Championship since its establishment by the Kerry County Board in 1889. The draw for the opening round fixtures took place on 9 April 2011. The championship ran from 10 June to 30 October 2011.

Dr. Crokes entered the championship as the defending champions.

The final was played on 30 October 2011 at FitzGerald Stadium in Killarney, between Dr. Crokes and Mid Kerry in what was their first ever meeting in the final. Dr. Crokes won the match by 2-08 to 0-09 to claim their eighth championship title overall and a second title in succession.

Dingle's David Geaney was the championship's top scorer with 1-23.

== Team changes ==
=== To Championship ===
Promoted from the Kerry Intermediate Football Championship

- Gneeveguilla

=== From Championship ===
Relegated to the Kerry Intermediate Football Championship

- Spa

== Results ==
=== Round 1 ===
10 June 2011 Round 1	Feale Rangers	1-11 - 1-06	Kilcummin	Frank Sheehy Park
	N Kennelly 1-3, C Cox 0-3, D Walsh 0-2, P Galvin 0-2, P Curtin 0-1.		C O'Leary 1-3, J O'Sullivan 0-2, I Devane 0-1.

11 June 2011 Round 1	Mid Kerry	0-12 - 0-08	Dingle	Coughlan Park
	D O'Sullivan 0-6, G O'Grady 0-3, G Sayers 0-1, S O'Sullivan 0-1, J Flynn 0-1.		D Geaney 0-7, M Geaney 0-1.

11 June 2011 Round 1	St. Kieran's	1-08 - 1-07	Kenmare	Scartaglin Grounds
	P O'Connor 1-0, M Coakley 0-2, T McGoldrick 0-2, J Walsh 0-1, E Sugrue 0-1, P Fitzgerald 0-1, J Buckley 0-1.		F O'Sullivan 1-0, P O'Connor 0-2, D Crowley 0-1, M Crowley 0-1, DJ Brennan 0-1, A O'Leary 0-1, MT O'Sullivan 0-1.

12 June 2011 Round 1	Killarney Legion	0-11 - 1-04	St. Brendan's	Legion Grounds
	J O'Donoghue 0-7, N Shevlin 0-2, S McCarthy 0-1, K Slattery 0-1.		M Brennan 1-0, D O'Callaghan 0-2, M Griffin 0-1, C Fitzgerald 0-1.

12 June 2011 Round 1	South Kerry	2-16 - 0-12	Shannon Rangers	Con Keating Park
	B Sheehan 1-7, D Daly 1-2, D O'Sullivan 0-2, G O'Driscoll 0-2, S O'Sullivan 0-1, M O'Connor 0-1, S O'Dwyer 0-1.		P Kennelly 0-7, P Costello 0-2, S Enright 0-1, A Langan 0-1, E Mangan 0-1.

12 June 2011 Round 1	Gneeveguilla	1-10 - 1-16	Dr. Crokes	Gneeveguilla Grounds
	L Murphy 0-7, PJ Murphy 1-0, G Moynihan 0-1, D Murphy 0-1, MS Murphy 0-1.		C Cooper 1-4, B Looney 0-4, K O'Leary 0-3, J Buckley 0-2, Doolan 0-2, A Kennelly 0-1.

12 June 2011 Round 1	St Michael's/Foilmore	0-09 - 0-10	Kerins O'Rahilly's	Con Keating Park
	R O'Connor 0-5, P O'Sullivan 0-3, K McCarthy 0-1.		D Quill 0-6, BJ Walsh 0-3, BJ Keane 0-1.

12 June 2011 Round 1	Austin Stacks	0-13 - 0-07	Ardfert	Austin Stack Park
	G O'Connell 0-4, D Long 0-3, K Donaghy 0-2, P McCarthy 0-1, P O'Donoghue 0-1, D O'Brien 0-1, S O'Callaghan 0-1.		D Wallace 0-5, S Griffin 0-1, T Moloney 0-1.

12 June 2011 Round 1	Laune Rangers	2-09 - 1-16	East Kerry	Coughlan Park
	MF Russell 1-5, C O'Dwyer 1-1, S Foley 0-2, P Crowley 0-1.		M O'Donoghue 1-6, N O'Mahony 0-5, C Cronin 0-2, J Sherwood 0-2, D Ahern 0-1.

12 June 2011 Round 1	Rathmore	1-08 - 0-08	West Kerry	Rathbeg Grounds
	G O'Keeffe 1-0, M O'Riordan 0-2, A O'Mahony 0-1, M Reen 0-1, J Buckley 0-1, J Moynihan 0-1, P Reen 0-1, Eoghan Lawlor 0-1.		SM Ó Conchúir 0-3, D O'Sullivan 0-2, T Ó Sé 0-1, J Hickson 0-1, L Maunsell 0-1.

=== Round 2 ===
18 June 2011 Round 2	Laune Rangers	0-15 - 0-12	Kenmare	J. P. O'Sullivan Park
	F Russell 0-9, K Doona 0-2, S McSweeney 0-2, S Foley 0-2.		MT O'Sullivan 0-7, DJ Brennan 0-2, M Hallissey 0-1, S O'Leary 0-1, C Hallissey 0-1.

18 June 2011 Round 2	West Kerry	0-15 - 1-07	St. Brendan's	Paddy Kennedy Memorial Park
	A Fitzgerald 0-6, D O'Sullivan 0-3, SM Ó Conchúir 0-2, T Ó Sé 0-1, E Hickson 0-1, J Hickson 0-1, C O'Mahony 0-1.		M Griffin 1-1, D O'Callaghan 0-3, C Fitgerald 0-1, P Hurley 0-1, S Brennan 0-1.

18 June 2011 Round 2	Shannon Rangers	1-14 - 1-07	St Michael's/Foilmore	Tarbert Grounds
	M Boyle 1-2, P Kennelly 0-5, E Mangan 0-2, K Mulvihill 0-2, J Wren 0-1, A Lanigan 0-1, D Wren 0-1.		P O'Sullivan 1-1, R O'Connor 0-3, M Thiemann 0-3.

19 June 2011 Round 2	Kilcummin	2-11 - 1-11	Ardfert	Kilcummin Grounds
	I Devane 2-2, J O'Sullivan 0-5, G O'Leary 0-2, K Gorman 0-1, S McSweeney 0-1.		Damien Wallace 0-7, JP Leen 1-1, J Egan 0-2, S Wallace 0-1.

19 June 2011 Round 2	Gneeveguilla	1-09 - 2-09	Dingle	Gneeveguilla Grounds
	Donie O'Connor 1-0, MS Murphy 0-2, L Murphy 0-2, G Moynihan 0-2, PJ Murphy 0-1, F McAuliffe 0-1, D Murphy 0-1.		D Geaney 1-3, P Murphy 1-1, P Geaney 0-3, J Sheehy 0-2.

=== Round 3 ===
9 July 2011 Round 3	Killarney Legion	1-10 - 0-15	East Kerry	FitzGerald Stadium
	J O'Donoghue 0-7, C Davies 1-0, D Twomey 0-1, S Keane 0-1, N Shevlin 0-1.		M O'Donoghue 0-7, C Cronin 0-2, D Ahern 0-2, M Daly 0-2, J Sherwood 0-1, N O'Mahony 0-1.

9 July 2011 Round 3	Kilcummin	1-05 - 0-15	Austin Stacks	FitzGerald Stadium
	J O'Sullivan 1-3, DJ Fleming 0-1, P Kelly 0-1.		D Long 0-5, F Mangan 0-3, G O'Connell 0-1, K Donaghy 0-1, D Bohan 0-1, P O'Donoghue 0-1, TJ Hogan 0-1, S O'Callaghan 0-1, D Clifford 0-1.

9 July 2011 Round 3	Dingle	2-12 - 3-08	St. Kieran's	Páirc an Aghasaigh
	D Geaney 0-8, J Sheehy 1-1, P Murphy 1-0, B O'Connor 0-1, A O'Neill 0-1, W Devane 0-1.		T McGoldrick 2-2, EJ O'Donoghue 1-0, J Walsh 0-2, P O'Connor 0-1, P Reidy 0-1, A Breen 0-1, D Murphy 0-1.

9 July 2011 Round 3	Laune Rangers	0-08 - 1-13	Kerins O'Rahilly's	J. P. O'Sullivan Park
	MF Russell 0-5, P Crowley 0-1, C O'Dwyer 0-1, S Foley 0-1.		D Quill 0-9, R O'Callaghan 1-0, BJ Keane 0-3, D Flaherty 0-1.

10 July 2011 Round 3	Shannon Rangers	1-12 - 1-15	West Kerry	Frank Sheehy Park
	T Joy 1-2, A Lanigan 0-3, B O'Grady 0-2, S McGinley 0-2, K Mulvihill 0-1, P Kennelly 0-1, M Boyle 0-1.		D O'Sullivan 1-2, A Fitzgerald 0-3, E Hickson 0-3, J Hickson 0-3, T Ó Sé 0-2, B O'Driscoll 0-1, M Ó Sé.

10 July 2011 Round 3	Feale Rangers	2-05 - 1-15	Mid Kerry	Frank Sheehy Park
	N Kennelly 1-2, J Browne 1-0, P Galvin 0-1, M O'Connor 0-1, P Curtin 0-1.		D O'Sullivan 0-6, C McGillycuddy 1-0, G O'Grady 0-3, D Kelliher 0-2, J Flynn 0-1, L Sheehan 0-1, T Ledden 0-1, C Kerins 0-1.

10 July 2011 Round 3	South Kerry	0-05 - 0-11	Dr. Crokes	Con Keating Park
	B Sheehan 0-2, B O'Dwyer 0-1, G O'Driscoll 0-1, S O'Dwyer 0-1.		D Casye 0-4, J Doolan 0-2, B Looney 0-2, J Buckley 0-1, E Brosnan 0-1, K O'Leary 0-1.

- Rathmore received a bye in this round.

=== Relegation playoffs ===
1 October 2011 Play-off	Gneeveguilla	1-09 - 0-09	Ardfert	Páirc de Búrca
	L Murphy (0-5, 3f), PJ Murphy (1-0), P O'Connor (0-1), D Murphy (0-1), G Moynihan (0-1, 1 '45'), Donie O'Connor (0-1).	Report	Damian Wallace (0-4, 3f, 1'45'), S Griffin (0-2), M Moloney (0-1), J Dowling (0-1), A Kelly (0-1).	Referee: T McCarthy (Castleisland Desmonds)

22 October 2011 Play-off	St Michael's/Foilmore	2-14 - 1-09	Ardfert	Listry Grounds
	R O'Connor 1-3, D Kelly 1-3, É O'Connor 0-4, S Fogarty 0-2, DJ Moran 0-1, B Galvin 0-1.		S Griffin 1-1, Damien Wallace 0-4, B O'Sullivan 0-3, Darran Wallace 0-1.

=== Quarter-finals ===
2 October 2011 Quarter-final	East Kerry	2-07 - 1-08	Dingle	Austin Stack Park
	A O'Sullivan 1-0, D Ahern 1-0, M O'Donoghue 0-3, M Culloty 0-1, J O'Donoghue 0-1, A Garnett 0-1, N O'Mahony 0-1.		D Geaney 0-5, P Geaney 1-0, P Devane 0-1, S Mac an tSighigh 0-1, M Geaney 0-1.

8 October 2011 Quarter-final	West Kerry	1-10 - 0-08	Kerins O'Rahilly's	Austin Stack Park
	A Fitzgerald 1-2, SM Ó Conchúir 0-3, J Hickson 0-2, D O'Sullivan 0-2, JB Spillane 0-1.		D Quill 0-2, BJ Keane 0-2, T Walsh 0-1, B Moran 0-1, K O'Mahony 0-1, D McLoughlin 0-1.

9 October 2011 Quarter-final	Mid Kerry	0-15 - 0-07	Rathmore	FitzGerald Stadium
	S O'Sullivan 0-4, G O'Grady 0-3, J Flynn 0-3, C Kerins 0-2, B Murphy 0-1, D Walsh 0-1, G Sayers 0-1.		M O'Riordan 0-4, M Reen 0-1, P Murphy 0-1, G O'Keeffe 0-1.	Referee: P Hayes (Kerins O'Rahilly's)

9 October 2011 Quarter-final	Dr. Crokes	1-14 - 1-13	Austin Stacks	FitzGerald Stadium
	J O'Leary 1-4, D Casey 0-5, B Looney 0-3, J Buckley 0-1, C Brady 0-1.		K Donaghy 1-2, G O'Connell 0-5, D Long 0-2, S O'Callaghan 0-2, M Collins 0-1, TJ Hogan 0-1.

=== Semi-finals ===
15 October 2011 Semi-final	Dr. Crokes	0-13 - 1-09	West Kerry	FitzGerald Stadium
	K O’Leary 0-4, C Cooper 0-3 (1f), A Kenneally 0-2, D Casey (f), J Doolan, B Looney (45), J Buckley 0-1 each.	Report	J Hickson 1-1, A Fitzgerald 0-3 (2fs), D O’Sullivan (f), E Kennedy, B O’Driscoll, E Hickson, SM Ó Conchúir 0-1 each.	Referee: P Hayes (Kerins O'Rahuilly's)

15 October 2011 Semi-final	Mid Kerry	1-12 - 1-07 (aet)	East Kerry	FitzGerald Stadium
	D O'Sullivan 1-2, G O'Grady 0-5, S O'Sullivan 0-4, C Kerlins 0-1.		A Gilee 1-0, M O'Donoghue 0-2, J O'Donoghue 0-1, B Russell 0-1, C Cronin 0-1, A Garnett 0-1, N O'Mahony 0-1.	Referee: J Lynch (Ballymacelligott)

=== Final ===
30 October 2011 Final	Dr. Crokes	2-08 - 0-09	Mid Kerry	FitzGerald Stadium
	C Cooper 1-3 (0-1f), D Casey 1-1 (0-1f), K O'Leary, B Looney, A O'Donovan, J Buckley 0-1 each.		G O'Grady (2f), G Sayers 0-2 each, D O'Sullivan, S O'Sullivan, C Kerins, P Kilkenny, B Murphy 0-1 each.	Referee: P Hayes (Kerins O'Rahilly's)

== Championship statistics ==
=== Top scorers ===
Overall

Rank	Player	Club	Tally	Total	Matches	Average
1	David Geaney	Dingle	1-23	26	4	6.50
2	Mike Frank Russell	Laune Rangers	1-19	22	3	7.33
3	Michael O'Donoghue	East Kerry	1-18	21	4	5.25
4	Damian Wallace	Ardfert	0-20	20	4	5.00
5	Darran O'Sullivan	Mid Kerry	1-15	18	5	3.60
6	Alan Fitzgerald	West Kerry	1-14	17	5	3.40
6	Declan Quill	Kerins O'Rahilly's	0-17	17	3	5.66
8	Colm Cooper	Dr. Crokes	2-10	16	5	3.33
8	Kieran O'Leary	Dr. Crokes	1-13	16	5	3.33
8	Gavan O'Grady	Mid Kerry	0-16	16	5	3.33

In a single game

Rank	Player	Club	Tally	Total	Opposition
1	Bryan Sheehan	South Kerry	1-07	10	Shannon Rangers
2	Michael O'Donoghue	East Kerry	1-06	9	Laune Rangers
2	Declan Quill	Kerins O'Rahilly's	0-09	9	Laune Rangers
2	Mike Frank Russell	Laune Rangers	0-09	9	Kenmare
5	Ian Devane	Kilcummin	2-02	8	Ardfert
5	Tom McGoldrick	St. Kieran's	2-02	8	Dingle
5	Mike Frank Russell	Laune Rangers	1-05	8	East Kerry
5	David Geaney	Dingle	0-08	8	St. Kieran's
9	Colm Cooper	Dr. Crokes	1-04	7	Gneeveguilla
9	Kieran O'Leary	Dr. Crokes	1-04	7	Austin Stacks
9	David Geaney	Dingle	0-07	7	Mid Kerry
9	James O'Donoghue	Killarney Legion	0-07	7	St. Brendan's
9	Paul Kennelly	Shannon Rangers	0-07	7	South Kerry
9	Liam Murphy	Gneeveguilla	0-07	7	Dr. Crokes
9	Mike Tim O'Sullivan	Kenmare	0-07	7	Laune Rangers
9	Damian Wallace	Ardfert	0-07	7	Kilcummin
9	James O'Donoghue	Killarney Legion	0-07	7	East Kerry
9	Michael O'Donoghue	East Kerry	0-07	7	Killarney Legion

=== Miscellaneous ===
- Gneeveguilla make their first appearance as a single club at senior level since 1994.
