= 2010 Kerry Senior Football Championship =

Gaelic football competition

- Dates: 11 June - 17 October 2010
- Teams: 20
- Sponsor: Allied Irish Bank
- Champions: Dr. Crokes (7th title); Brian Looney (captain); Harry O'Neill (manager)
- Runners-up: Austin Stacks; T. J. Hogan (captain); Wayne Quillinan (manager)
- Relegated: Spa

Tournament statistics
- Matches played: 31
- Goals scored: 59 (1.9 per match)
- Points scored: 643 (20.74 per match)
- Top scorer(s): Colm Cooper (4-27)

The 2010 Kerry Senior Football Championship was the 110th staging of the Kerry Senior Football Championship since its establishment by the Kerry County Board in 1889. The draw for the opening round fixtures took place on 8 May 2010. The championship ran from 11 June to 17 October 2010.

South Kerry entered the championship as the defending champions, however, they were beaten by Dr Crokes in the semi-finals.

The final was played on 17 October 2009 at FitzGerald Stadium in Killarney, between Dr. Crokes and Austin Stacks in what was their second meeting in the final overall and a first in 16 years. Dr. Crokes won the match by 1-15 to 0-11 to claim their seventh championship title overall and a first title in 10 years.

Colm Cooper was the championship's top scorer with 4-27.

== Team changes ==
=== To Championship ===
Promoted from the Kerry Intermediate Football Championship

- Spa

=== From Championship ===
Relegated to the Kerry Intermediate Football Championship

- An Ghaeltacht

== Results ==
=== Round 1 ===
11 June 2010 Round 1	St. Brendan's	0-10 - 0-07	East Kerry	Austin Stack Park
	K Hurley 0-3, B Poff 0-2, C Daly 0-1, D O'Callaghan 0-1, P O'Donoghue 0-1, L O'Sullivan 0-1, D Doody 0-1.		C O'Shea 0-3, M Daly 0-1, Donald O'Sullivan 0-1, J Brosnan 0-1, D Murphy 0-1.

12 June 2010 Round 1	Dingle	2-16 - 2-08	Shannon Rangers	Páirc an Aghasaigh
	M Slattery 1-3, D Geaney 0-6, M Evans 1-2, P Devane 0-1, P Quaid 0-1, B Kelliher 0-1, D Ó Súilleabháin 0-1, S Dowd 0-1.		B O'Grady 2-3, M Boyle 0-5.

18 June 2010 Round 1	Austin Stacks	1-12 - 0-06	Ardfert	Austin Stack Park
	K Donaghy 1-2, G O'Connell 0-3, D Bohan 0-1, TJ Hogan 0-1, W KIrby 0-1, P McCannon 0-1, F Mangan 0-1, M Collins 0-1, D Mannix 0-1.		Damien Wallace 0-3, S Wallace 0-2, J Dowling 0-1.

19 June 2010 Round 1	Killarney Legion	0-06 - 1-12	Kilcummin	FitzGerald Stadium
	J O'Donoghue 0-3, D Murphy 0-2, N Shevlin 0-1.		KSB O'Doherty 1-0, O'Donoghue 0-3, E O'Donoghue 0-2, DJ Fleming 0-2, C O'Leary 0-2, S McSweeney 0-1, G O'Leary 0-1, J Devane 0-1.

19 June 2010 Round 1	South Kerry	0-14 - 0-06	St Michael's/Foilmore	Con Keating Park
	B Sheehan 0-5, Declan O'Sullivan 0-4, P O'Donoghue 0-3, B Hickey 0-1, C O'Connor 0-1.		R O'Connor 0-3, E O'Connor 0-2, C O'Connor 0-1.

19 June 2010 Round 1	Spa	0-10 - 2-10	Feale Rangers	FitzGerald Stadium
	M O'Donoghue 0-6, A Giles 0-1, A Cahill 0-1, P Russell 0-1, D O'Sullivan 0-1.		N Kennelly 0-4, P Galvin 1-0, E Fitzmaurice 1-0, D Walsh 0-2, C Cox 0-2, D Somers 0-1, D Griffin 0-1.

20 June 2010 Round 1	Mid Kerry	3-09 - 1-10	St. Kieran's	Coughlan Park
	G Sayers 2-1, C Kerins 1-0, L Sheehan 0-3, K Foley 0-2, F Courtney 0-1, D Kelliher 0-1, D O'Sullivan 0-1.		T McGoldrick 0-7, T O'Mahony 1-0, P McCarthy 0-1, J Buckley 0-1, D O'Shea 0-1.

20 June 2010 Round 1	Dr. Crokes	2-15 - 0-10	West Kerry	Lewis Road
	C Cooper 1-6, E Brosnan 1-1, D Casey 0-4, K O'Leary 0-2, J Buckley 0-1, S Myers 0-1.		A Fitzgerald 0-5, M Fitzgerald 0-2, M Ó Sé 0-1, D Ó Sé 0-1, B O'Driscoll 0-1.

20 June 2010 Round 1	Laune Rangers	2-08 - 2-11	Rathmore	Coughlan Park
	K Flynn 1-2, S McSweeney 1-1, L Hassett 0-2, P Crowley 0-1, P Joy 0-1, C Doona 0-1.		J Moynihan 2-0, M O'Riordan 0-4, M Reen 0-3, J O'Sullivan 0-1, A O'Mahony 0-1, J Buckley 0-1, P Reen 0-1.

20 June 2010 Round 1	Kenmare	0-11 - 1-11	Kerins O'Rahilly's	Templenoe Grounds
	A O'Sullivan 0-3, L O'Shea 0-2, T Doyle 0-2, F O'Sullivan 0-1, MT O'Sullivan 0-1, M McNally 0-1, A O'Leary 0-1.		M O'Sullivan 1-3, D Quill 0-3, BJ Keane 0-2, M O'Shea 0-1, J O'Connor 0-1, D Moran 0-1.

=== Round 2 ===
10 July 2010 Round 2	Kenmare	2-13 - 2-09 (aet)	Ardfert	Templenoe Grounds
	A O'Sullivan 0-4, L O'Shea 0-4, D O'Connor 1-0, T Doyle 1-0, F O'Sullivan 0-1, M Crowley 0-1, S Cremin 0-1, MT O'Sullivan 0-1, D Cahalane 0-1.		Damien Wallace 1-2, S Wallace 0-4, S Leen 1-0, B Egan 0-1, J Egan 0-1, Darren Wallace 0-1.

10 July 2010 Round 2	Killarney Legion	1-04 - 0-10	St Michael's/Foilmore	FitzGerald Stadium
	K Breen 1-1, M O'Sullivan 0-1, D Pyne 0-1, D O'Sullivan 0-1.		R O'Connor 0-3, E O'Connor 0-3, D Kelly 0-2, S Fogarty 0-1, DJ Moran 0-1.

11 July 2010 Round 2	Laune Rangers	1-12 - 1-08	Spa
	MF Russell 1-4, C Doona 0-3, P Joy 0-2, S Foley 0-1, J Coffey 0-1, S McSweeney 0-1.		M O'Donoghue 1-2, C Cronin 0-3, N O'Mahony 0-3.

11 July 2010 Round 2	Shannon Rangers	0-14 - 1-19 (aet)	West Kerry	Ballylongford Grounds
	M Boyle 0-9, E Mangan 0-3, B O'Grady 0-1, D Culhane 0-1;		SM Ó Conchúir 0-7, B O'Driscoll 1-1, A Mac Gearailt 0-2, T Ó Sé 0-2, N Sheehy 0-2, Hickson 0-1, M Fitzgerald 0-1, E Mac Gearailt 0-1, J Hickson 0-1, S Foley 0-1.

Round 2	St. Kieran's	w/o - scr.	East Kerry

=== Relegation playoffs ===
10 September 2010 Playoff	Ardfert	1-08 - 0-09	Killarney Legion	Austin Stack Park
	Damien Wallace 1-1, S Wallace 0-3, C Wallace 0-2, J Dowling 0-1, J Egan 0-1.		D O'Sullivan 0-3, J Lyne 0-2, M O'Sullivan 0-2, S McCarthy 0-1, S Keane 0-1.

2 October 2010 Playoff	Killarney Legion	0-14 - 0-14	Spa	FitzGerald Stadium
	M O'Sullivan 0-4, D O'Sullivan 0-2, T Regan 0-2, D Pyne 0-2, K Slattery 0-1, P Lucey 0-1, S Keane 0-1, S McCarthy 0-1.		C Cronin 0-4, M O'Donoghue 0-3, N O'Mahony 0-3, A Cahill 0-1, P Russell 0-1, E Cronin 0-1, K O'Regan 0-1.

16 October 2010 Playoff replay	Killarney Legion	3-10 - 0-12	Spa	FitzGerald Stadium
	P Lucey 2-1, M O'Sullivan 1-2, T Regan 0-4, S Keane 0-2, N Shevlin 0-1.		M O'Donoghue 0-5, C Cronin 0-2, H O'Donoghue 0-2, A Cahill 0-1, N O'Mahony 0-1, D Murphy 0-1.

=== Round 3 ===
28 August 2010 Round 3	Dr. Crokes	3-15 - 1-04	Kenmare	Templenoe Grounds
	C Cooper 1-10, B Looney 1-1, J Buckley 1-0, S Myers 0-1, D Casey 0-1, E Brosnan 0-1, K O'Leary 0-1.		L Shea 1-1, T Doyle 0-1, DJ Brennan 0-1, D Cahalane 0-1.

28 August 2010 Round 3	Austin Stacks	1-13 - 0-14	Feale Rangers	Frank Sheehy Park
	K Donaghy 1-4, G O'Connell 0-4, P McCannon 0-2, M Collins 0-1, TJ Hogan 0-1, D Long 0-1.		N Kennelly 0-8, C Cox 0-5, D Walsh 0-1.

29 August 2010 Round 3	Dingle	1-13 - 1-09	St Michael's/Foilmore	Páirc an Aghasaigh
	D Geaney 0-8, P Geaney 1-2, P Quaid 0-1, M Geaney 0-1, M Evans 0-1.		R O'Connor 0-5, S Fogarty 1-0, P King 0-2, E O'Connor 0-1, B Smith 0-1.

29 August 2010 Round 3	Kerins O'Rahilly's	0-10 - 0-07	St. Brendan's	Austin Stack Park
	D Quill 0-6, M O'Sullivan 0-2, BJ Walsh 0-2.		A O'Donoghue 0-2, M Griffin 0-2, A Geaney 0-1, P O'Donoghue 0-1, M Brennan 0-1.

29 August 2010 Round 3	South Kerry	1-15 - 1-06	St. Kieran's	Con Keating Park
	B Sheehan 1-9, A O'Sullivan 0-2, N O'Shea 0-2, D O'Sullivan 0-1, C O'Driscoll 0-1.		EJ O'Donoghue 1-1, T McGoldrick 0-3, E Walsh 0-1.

29 August 2010 Round 3	Rathmore	2-08 - 1-08	Mid Kerry	J. P. O'Sullivan
	J Buckley 2-2, E Lawlor 0-2, M O'Riordan 0-2, S Lehane 0-1, E O'Mahony 0-1.		G O'Grady 1-1, K Foley 0-3, D Walsh 0-2, M Burke 0-1, D O'Sullivan 0-1.

29 August 2010 Round 3	West Kerry	1-10 - 1-07	Laune Rangers	J. P. O'Sullivan
	S Foley 1-0, S Ó Conchúir 0-3, B O'Driscoll 0-2, N Sheehy 0-2, MJ Fitzgerald 0-1, R Mac Gearailt 0-1, E Hickson 0-1,		MF Russell 0-5, J Coffey 1-0, S McSweeney 0-2.

- Kilcummin received a bye in this round.

=== Quarter-finals ===
11 September 2010 Quarter-final	Dr. Crokes	1-08 - 0-05	West Kerry	Austin Stack Park
	K O'Leary 1-2, B Looney 0-2, N O'Connell 0-1, J Buckley 0-1, D Casey 0-1, E Brosnan 0-1.		SM Ó Conchúir 0-2, A Mac Gearailt 0-1, B O'Driscoll 0-1, A Fitzgerald 0-1.

12 September 2010 Quarter-final	Austin Stacks	1-13 - 1-05	Rathmore	FitzGerald Stadium
	D Long 1-2, M Collins 0-4, G O'Connell 0-3, K Donaghy 0-2, J Dennis 0-1, S Carroll 0-1.		B O'Leary 1-0, M O'Riordan 0-3, D O'Sullivan 0-1, J Moynihan 0-1.

12 September 2010 Quarter-final	South Kerry	1-14 - 0-08	Kilcummin	FitzGerald Stadium
	B Sheehan 0-5, N O'Shea 0-4, R Hussey 0-4, A O'Sullivan 1-0, P O'Donoghue 0-1.		J O'Sullivan 0-1, S McSweeney 0-1, P Kelly 0-1, DJ Fleming 0-1, G O'Leary 0-1, E O'Donoghue 0-1, J Devane 0-1, D O'Leary 0-1.

17 September 2010 Quarter-final	Dingle	2-10 - 0-09	Kerins O'Rahilly's	Austin Stack Park
	P Geaney 2-2, D Geaney 0-3, M Evans 0-3, P Quaid 0-1, J Sheehy 0-1.		BJ Walsh 0-3, D Quill 0-3, M O'Sullivan 0-1, J O'Connor 0-1, D Moran 0-1.

=== Semi-finals ===
3 October 2010 Semi-final	Austin Stacks	2-11 - 2-09	Dingle	FitzGerald Stadium
	D Long 2-4, G O'Connell 0-3, M Collins 0-2, W Kirby 0-1, K Donaghy 0-1.		D Geaney 1-6, P Geaney 1-2, D Devane 0-1.

3 October 2010 Semi-final	Dr. Crokes	2-15 - 1-13	South Kerry	FitzGerald Stadium
	C Cooper 1-6, B Looney 1-4, A O'Donovan 0-2, C Brady 0-1, D Casey 0-1, S Myers 0-1.		B Sheehan 1-7, R Hussey 0-4, A O'Sullivan 0-1, B Hickey 0-1.

=== Final ===
17 October 2010 Final	Dr. Crokes	1-15 - 0-11	Austin Stacks	FitzGerald Stadium
	C Cooper 1-5 (three frees); A O’Donovan, D Casey (three frees) 0-4 each; C Brady, B Looney 0-1 each.	Report	D Long 0-5 (four frees); M Collins 0-3; TJ Hogan, S Carroll, K Donaghy 0-1 each.	Referee: P O'Sullivan (Firies)

== Championship statistics ==
=== Top scorers ===
Overall

Rank	Player	Club	Tally	Total	Matches	Average
1	Colm Cooper	Dr. Crokes	4-27	39	5	7.80
2	Bryan Sheehan	South Kerry	2-26	32	4	8.00
3	David Geaney	Dingle	1-23	26	4	6.50
4	Dara Long	Austin Stacks	3-12	21	4	5.25
5	Mike O'Donoghue	Spa	1-16	19	4	4.75
6	Paul Geaney	Dingle	4-06	18	3	6.00
7	Kieran Donaghy	Austin Stacks	2-10	16	5	3.20
8	Brian Looney	Dr. Crokes	2-08	14	5	2.80
8	Mikey Boyle	Shannon Rangers	0-14	14	2	7.00
10	Graham O'Connell	Austin Stacks	0-13	13	5	2.60

In a single game

Rank	Player	Club	Tally	Total	Opposition
1	Colm Cooper	Dr. Crokes	1-10	13	Kenmare
2	Bryan Sheehan	South Kerry	1-09	12	St. Kieran's
3	Dara Long	Austin Stacks	2-04	10	Dingle
3	Bryan Sheehan	South Kerry	1-07	10	Dr. Crokes
5	Barry O'Grady	Shannon Rangers	2-03	9	Dingle
5	Colm Cooper	Dr. Crokes	1-06	9	West Kerry
5	David Geaney	Dingle	1-06	9	Austin Stacks
5	Colm Cooper	Dr. Crokes	1-06	9	South Kerry
5	Mikey Boyle	Shannon Rangers	0-09	9	West Kerry
10	Johnny Buckley	Rathmore	2-02	8	Mid Kerry
10	Paul Geaney	Dingle	2-02	8	Kerins O'Rahilly's
10	Colm Cooper	Dr. Crokes	1-05	8	Austin Stacks
10	David Geaney	Dingle	0-08	8	St Michael's/Foilmore
10	Noel Kennelly	Feale Rangers	0-08	8	Austin Stacks

=== Miscellaneous ===
- Dr. Crokes won a first title in ten years.
- Austin Stacks qualified for the final for the first time since 2001.
- The championship is won by a club side for the first time since 2003.
- Spa make their first appearance as a single club at senior level since 1983.
