= David Geaney =

David Geaney may refer to:

- David Geaney (Castleisland Gaelic footballer) (born 1940)
- David Geaney (Kerry Gaelic footballer, born 1985)
