= James O'Shea (disambiguation) =

James or Jim O'Shea may refer to:

- James O'Shea, Gaelic footballer, active in the 1990s and 2000s
- James O'Shea (association footballer) (born 1988), Irish association footballer
- James O'Shea (sculptor) of O'Shea and Whelan
