= Adrian O'Connell =

Irish Gaelic footballer

Personal information
- Born: County Kerry
- Occupation: student
- Height: 5 ft 11 in (180 cm)

Sport
- Sport: Gaelic football
- Position: Corner-back
Club
- Years: Club
- St. Michael's/Foilmore
Club titles
- Kerry titles: 4
Inter-county
Years	County	Apps (scores)
2006-2011	Kerry	3 (0-00)
Inter-county titles
- Munster titles: 3
- All-Irelands: 2
- NFL: 2

Adrian O'Connell is a Gaelic footballer from County Kerry, Ireland. He plays with the Kerry intercounty team and with his club St. Michael's/Foilmore. He was a member of the Kerry team that won All Irelands in 2006 and 2007. His first League appearance for Kerry was in 2006 versus Fermanagh and he made his first Championship versus Tipperary during the Munster Senior Football Championship in 2010. He was also part of the Kerry U21 Team in 2004. He had much success with the South Kerry team winning County Championships in 2004-2006 and again in 2009. With St. Michael's/Foilmore he has also had much success. He won County and Munster Intermediate Championships in 2008 and then added an All Ireland in 2009. So far he has won 1 All-Ireland, 2 Munster Championship, 1 Club Intermediate, 3 Senior County Championship, 2 Minor County Championship and 2 U21 County Championship medals.
