= 2013–14 All-Ireland Senior Club Football Championship =

Irish Football Championship

- Dates: 20 October 2013 – 17 March 2014
- Teams: 32
- Sponsor: Allied Irish Bank
- Champions: St Vincent's (3rd title); Ger Brennan (captain); Tommy Conroy (manager)
- Runners-up: Castlebar Mitchels; Donal Newcombe (captain); Pat Holmes (manager)

Tournament statistics
- Matches played: 32
- Top scorer(s): Tomás Quinn (2–33)

The 2013–14 All-Ireland Senior Club Football Championship was the 44th staging of the All-Ireland Senior Club Football Championship since its establishment by the Gaelic Athletic Association in 1970–71. The competition began on 20 October 2013 and ended on 17 March 2014.

St Brigid's entered the competition as the defending champion; however, the club was beaten by Castlebar Mitchels in the Connacht Club Championship.

St Vincent's defeated Castlebar Mitchels by 4–12 to 2–11 in the final at Croke Park on 17 March 2014 to win the competition. It was the club's third title overall and a first since 2008.

Tomás Quinn of the St Vincent's club was the competition's top scorer with 2–33.

== Connacht ==
=== Quarter-final ===
27 October 2013 Quarter-final	Tourlestrane	0-09 - 2-10	St Brigid's	Markievicz Park
	S Henry (0-2), B Egan (0-2, fs), J Kelly (0-2), J Quinn (0-1), C Henry (0-1), G McGowan (0-1).	Report	F Dolan (1-3, 0-2 fs), G Dolan (1-0), S Kilbride (0-2, fs), K Mannion (0-2), P Kelly (0-1); E Sheehy (0-1), A Gleeson (0-1).

=== Semi-finals ===
10 November 2013 Semi-final	St Mary's Kiltoghert	1-05 - 5-15	St Brigid's	Páirc Sheáin Mhic Dhiarmada
	R Mulvey (1-3); N McWeeney (0-1); A Doherty (0-1).	Report	F Dolan (1-3), R Blaine (1-2), K Mannion (1-1), P Kelly (1-1); S Kilbride (0-4, 2f), D O'Connor (1-0), G Dolan (0-3), N McInerney (0-1).

10 November 2013 Semi-final	Corofin	1-10 - 2-08	Castlebar Mitchels	Pearse Stadium
	G Sice 1-3 (0-2fs), I Burke 0-4 (3fs), A O'Donovan ('45'), R Steede, J Canney 0-1 each.	Report	T King 0-5 (4fs), R Feeney 1-1, N Lydon 1-0, R O'Malley, J Durcan 0-1 each.

=== Final ===
24 November 2013 Final	St Brigid's	2-12 - 3-13	Castlebar Mitchels	Dr Hyde Park
	S Kilbride 1-3 (0-2fs), F Dolan 0-5 (3fs 1 '45'), R Blaine 1-0, C McHugh, P Kelly, N Grehan, A Gleeson 0-1 each.	Report	T King 0-6 (4fs), N Douglas 1-2 (1-0 pen, 1f), D Kirby 1-1, R Feeney 1-0, J Durcan 0-2, N Lydon, C Costello 0-1 each.

== Leinster ==
=== First round ===
27 October 2013 First round	St Loman's	1-11 - 1-10	Old Leighlin	Cusack Park
	J Heslin (1-6), P Sharry (0-2), S Dempsey (0-1), K Reilly (0-1), J O'Toole (0-1).	Report	C Coughlan (1-4), S Kinsella (0-2), P Hickey (0-2), H Gahan (0-1); J Clarke (0-1);

27 October 2013 First round	Newtown Blues	0-12 - 1-07	Tullamore	Drogheda Park
	R Carr (0-4), H McGinn (0-3), J Kermode (0-2); B Sharkey (0-1), C Judge (0-1), B Kermode (0-1).	Report	J Moloney (0-4), N Bracken (1-0), J O'Donohue (0-1), M Brazil (0-1); K Williamson (0-1).

3 November 2013 First round	Longford Slashers	3-13 - 0-10	Rathnew	Pearse Park
	C Smith (1-3, 3f); M Smith (1-3, 2f), T Clendenning (1-1), N Mulligan (0-2), M Diffley (0-2); P Brady (0-1), P Dobson (0-1).	Report	T Gill (0-6, 5f), S Kavanagh (0-1), L Glynn (0-1f), E Doyle (0-1f), J Hollingsworth (0-1).

=== Quarter-finals ===
10 November 2013 Quarter-final	St Loman's	0-09 - 0-11	St Vincent's	Cusack Park
	J Heslin 0-4 (2fs), K Reilly, S Dempsey 0-2 each, W McGovern 0-1.	Report	T Quinn 0-7 (5fs, '45'), C Dorney 0-2, R Trainor, G Burke 0-1 each.

10 November 2013 Quarter-final	Newtown Blues	1-13 - 2-13	Summerhill	Drogheda Park
	C Judge 0-6 (4f), B Kermode 1-0, H McGinn, R Carr 0-2 each, J Kermode, K Lynch, S Moonan (f) 0-1 each.	Report	B Ennis 0-5 (4fs), P Rispin 1-1, A Kenny 1-0, M Byrne 0-3, S Dalton 0-2, B Dardis, C Gillespie 0-1 each.

10 November 2013 Quarter-final	St Martin's	0-04 - 2-13	Moorefield	Wexford Park
	C Lyng (0-2, 1f), S Murphy (0-1), C Redmond (0-1).	Report	D Whyte (1-2, 0-2f), C Kelly (0-4), P Murray (1-0), N Hurley Lynch (0-2), R Sweeney (0-1), D Flynn (0-1), A Mullins (0-1), K Murnahan (0-1), K Duane (0-1).

17 November 2013 Quarter-final	Longford Slashers	3-07 - 1-15 (aet)	Portlaoise	Pearse Park
	N Mulligan 1-2 (2 '45s), M Smith, M Nevin 1-1 each, C Smith 0-2 (2fs), P Foy 0-1.	Report	C Rogers 0-6 (2fs), B McCormack 1-2, P Cahillane 0-2, C Boyle, A Kelly, K Fitzpatrick, M Nolan, G Brody 0-1 each.

=== Semi-finals ===
24 November 2013 Semi-final	St. Vincent's	1-14 - 1-10	Summerhill	Parnell Park
	T Quinn 1-8 (three frees, one ‘45), G Burke and R Trainor 0-2 each, S Carthy and E Fennell 0-1 each.	Report	P Rispin 1-0, B Ennis 0-3 (three frees), C Gillespie and S Dalton 0-2 each, D Larkin, A Kenny and M Byrne (one free) 0-1 each.

24 November 2013 Semi-final	Portlaoise	1-09 - 0-10	Moorefield	O'Moore Park
	B McCormack (1-2), C Rogers (0-2, 1f), P Cahillane (0-2), M Nolan (0-1, 1f); B Glynn (0-1), B Fitzgerald (0-1).	Report	R Sweeney (0-4, 4f), A Tyrrell (0-3, 3f); K Duane (0-1).

=== Final ===
8 December 2013 Final	Portlaoise	3-09 - 3-12	St Vincent's	O'Connor Park
	C Rogers (2-3, 1-0 pen, 0-3f), B Glynn (1-1); P Cahillane (0-3, 1f), B Smith (0-1), B McCormack (0-1).	Report	T Quinn (0-8, 0-4f), R Trainor (1-1), C Dorney (1-1), S Carthy (1-0); G Burke (0-1), D Connolly (0-1).

== Munster ==
=== Quarter-finals ===
3 November 2013 Quarter-final	Ballinacourty	2-07 - 0-11	Dromcollogher/Broadford	Fraher Field
	M Ferncombe, J O’Brien 1-0 each; M O’Halloran 0-3 (1f, 1 45’); S Briggs 0-2; M Fives, G Hurney 0-1 each.	Report	D McCarthy, K Phair (1f) 0-4 each; R Lynch 0-2; M Reidy 0-1.

3 November 2013 Quarter-final	Dr Crokes	1-11 - 0-08	Castlehaven	Lewis Road
	B Looney 0-4 (2 ’45s’), G O’Shea 1-0, D Casey 0-3 (1f), A O’Sullivan, K O’Leary 0-2.	Report	S Hurley 0-4, B Hurley, D Hurley, C Hayes, D Cahalane (’45’) 0-1 each.

=== Semi-finals ===
16 November 2013 Semi-final	Dr Crokes	3-16 - 1-05	Loughmore–Castleiney	Lewis Road
	B Looney 1-6; C Cooper 1-3 (1-0pen, 0-1f); K O’Leary 1-2; J Doolan 0-3; D Casey (f), A O’Sullivan 0-1 each.	Report	J McGrath 1-4 (1-0pen, 0-3f); C McGrath 0-1.

17 November 2013 Semi-final	Cratloe	1-10 - 0-11	Ballinacourty	Cusack Park
	C McGrath (1-2), C McInerney (0-4, 2f), L Markham (0-2); S Collins (0-1), P Collins (0-1).	Report	P Hurney (0-4), S O'Hare (0-2), S Briggs (0-1), J Hurney (0-1), J O'Mahoney (0-1), M Ferncombe (0-1); M O'Halloran (0-1).

=== Final ===
1 December 2013 Final	Cratloe	0-12 - 0-13	Dr. Crokes	Gaelic Grounds
	C McInerney (0-5, 2fs), C McGrath (0-2), S Chaplin, F Lynch, S Collins, L Markham, E Boyce (f) (0-1 each).	Report	C Cooper (0-4, 1f), A O’Sullivan, B Looney, D Casey (1f) (0-2 each), K O’Leary, J Buckley, F Fitzgerald (0-1 each).

== Ulster ==
=== Preliminary round ===
20 October 2013 Preliminary round	Ballinderry Shamrocks	0-14 - 0-10	Clonoe O'Rahilly's	Celtic Park
	R Bell (0-4, 0-1f), A Devlin (0-2), C Devlin (0-2, 0-1f), C Gilligan (0-2), C Nevin (0-1), D Lawn (0-1); D McKinless (0-1), D McGuckin (0-1).	Report	D McNulty (0-4, 0-3f), C McAliskey (0-3f), PJ Lavery (0-2); Ryan T O'Neill (0-1).

=== Quarter-finals ===
3 November 2013 Quarter-final	Glenswilly	1-10 - 0-10	St Gall's	MacCumhaill Park
	M Murphy (1-4, 1-0 pen, 0-1f, 2'45s), G McFadden (0-3f), N Gallagher (0-1), K McFadden (0-1), B Farrelly (0-1).	Report	C McGourty (0-5, 4f), K Niblock (0-1), A Healy (0-1); S Burke (0-1), M Pollock (0-1), K Stewart (0-1).

3 November 2013 Quarter-final	Roslea Shamrocks	1-12 - 0-11	Ballinagh	Brewster Park
	Seamie Quigley (1-07, 5f, 1 pen), Sean Quigley (0-04), S Lynch (0-01).	Report	K Smith (0-03), N McDermott (0-02, 2f), D Finnegan (0-02), P O'Reilly (0-01), T Moore (0-01), C Gumley (0-01), A Gaynor (0-01).

3 November 2013 Quarter-final	Kilcoo	2-09 - 1-12 (aet)	Crossmaglen Rangers	Páirc Esler
	R Johnston (1-1); D O'Hanlon (0-4, 3f), P Greenan (1-0), P Devlin (0-3, 1f), Gerard McEvoy (0-1).	Report	S Kernan (1-1); T Kernan (0-6f), K Brennan (0-2), M Aherne (0-1), J Hanratty (0-1), C Cumiskey (0-1).

3 November 2013 Quarter-final	Scotstown	0-10 - 1-08	Ballinderry Shamrocks	Clones
	C McCarthy (0-2, 2f), K Hughes (0-2, 1f), S Carey (0-1), D Hughes (0-1); BN Corrigan (0-1), J Turley (0-1); R Beggan (0-1, 1f); B McGinnity (0-1).	Report	D Conway (1-0), C Devlin (0-2, 1f), C Gilligan (0-2, 2f), R Bell (0-1), A Devlin (0-1), D McGuckin (0-1); M McIver (0-1).

10 November 2013 Quarter-final replay	Kilcoo	3-10 - 1-08 (aet)	Crossmaglen Rangers	Athletic Grounds
	P Devlin (2-2, 1-0 pen), R Johnston (1-1); D O’Hanlon (0-4, 0-3f), J McClean (0-1), N McEvoy (0-1), Gerard McEvoy (0-1).	Report	T Kernan (1-3, 0-3f); C Cumiskey (0-2); M Aherne (0-1), K Carragher (0-1), A Cunningham (0-1).

=== Semi-finals ===
17 November 2013 Semi-final	Glenswilly	3-09 - 2-08	Roslea Shamrocks	Healy Park
	C Kelly (2-1), M Murphy (1-2, 0-2 frees), G McFadden (0-3, 0-2 frees), J Gibbons (0-1), D McGinley (0-1), C Bonner (0-1);		Seamus Quigley (1-4, 1-0 pen, 2f), C Mulligan (1-0), J McMahon (0-1), K Cosgrove (0-1), P Lynch (0-1), D Reilly (0-1).

17 November 2013 Semi-final	Kilcoo	0-09 - 1-10	Ballinderry Shamrocks	Athletic Grounds
	D O'Hanlon (0-3f), P Devlin (0-2, 1f), S O'Hanlon (0-1), J Johnston (0-1), S Devlin (0-1), C Laverty (0-1).	Report	M McIver (1-2); C Devlin (0-3f), R Bell (0-2), C Gilligan (0-2), D McGuckin (0-1).

=== Final ===
1 December 2013 Final	Glenswilly	2-06 - 1-13	Ballinderry Shamrocks	Healy Park
	M Murphy 1-3 (1 '45'), Caolan Kelly 1-1; Colin Kelly 0-1, D McGinley 0-1.	Report	M McIver 1-0; C Devlin 0-3 (1f), C Gilligan 0-3 (2f), D McGuckin 0-2; J Conway 0-2; D McKinless 0-1, A Devlin 0-1, D Conway 0-1.

== Quarter-final ==
15 December 2013 Quarter-final	Kingdom Kerry Gaels	2-07 - 3-09	Ballinderry Shamrocks	Emerald GAA Grounds
	S Browne (1-1); K Holland (1-1, 1-0 pen), T O'Sullivan (0-2f), A Dillane (0-1), C McCallion (0-1); L Colfer (0-1f).	Report	C Devlin (2-1, 0-1f), D McKinless (1-1), R Bell (0-2), C Gilligan (0-2, 1f), C Nevin (0-1), D McGuckin (0-1); F Bell (0-1).

== Semi-finals ==
15 February 2014 Semi Final	Castlebar Mitchels	3–13 - 1–11	Dr Crokes	O'Moore Park, Portlaoise
2:00pm	T King 1-3 (0-3f), P Durcan 2–0, A Walsh, R Feeney, B Moran 0–2 each, D Newcombe, G McDonagh, D Kirby, N Lydon (0–1) each.	Report	K O'Leary 1–0, A O'Sullivan 0–3, C Cooper, A O'Donovan 0–2 each, F Fitzgerald, J Buckley, D Casey, K Ward (0–1) each.	Referee: C Reilly (Meath)

15 February 2014 Semi-final	Ballinderry Shamrocks	1–13 - 2–14	St Vincent's	Páirc Esler
3:30pm	C Devlin 0-5 (0-1f), D McKinless (1–0), R Bell, C Gilligan (0-1f), R Wilson 0–2 each, A Devlin, J Conway 0–1 each.	Report	T Quinn 1-8 (0-4f, 1 ’45), C Dorney 1–1, D Connolly 0–3, G Burke and SB Carthy 0–1 each.	Referee: M Duffy (Sligo)

== Final ==
17 March 2014 Final	St Vincent's	4-12 - 2-11	Castlebar Mitchels	Croke Park
3:45pm	D Connolly 2-5, SB Carthy 0-3, M Concarr 1-0, C Dorney 1-0, T Quinn 0-2 (1f), R Trainor 0-1, K Golden 0-1 (1f)	Report	D Kirby 2-0, N Lydon 0-3, P Durcan 0-2, T King 0-2 (1f), A Walsh 0-1, N Douglas 0-1, F Durcan 0-1, B Moran 0-1	Attendance: 31,472; Referee: E Kinsella (Laois)

== Statistics ==
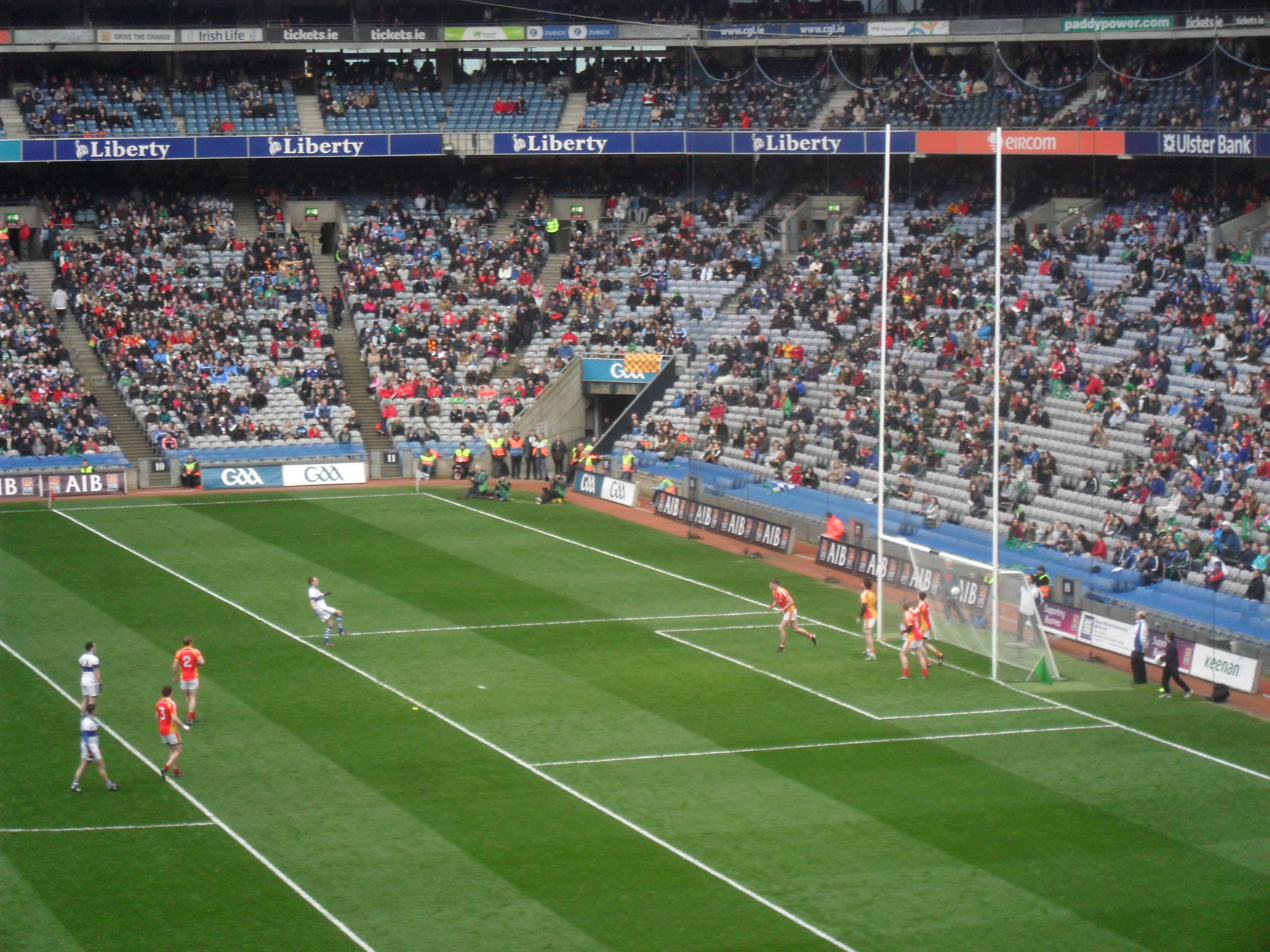
The 2013–14 All-Ireland Club SFC final, 17 March 2014, Croke Park. St Vincents (white and blue) defeated Castlebar Mitchels (red and gold).

=== Miscellaneous ===
Overall

Rank	Player	Club	Tally	Total	Matches	Average
1	Tomás Quinn	St Vincent's	2-33	39	5	7.80
2	Collie Devlin	Ballinderry Shamrocks	2-16	22	6	3.66
3	Tom King	Castlebar Mitchels	1-16	19	4	4.75
4	Michael Murphy	Glenswilly	3-09	18	3	6.00
5	Frankie Dolan	St Brigid's	2-11	17	3	5.66
5	Craig Rogers	Portlaoise	2-11	17	3	5.66
5	Séamus Quigley	Roslea Shamrocks	2-11	17	2	8.50
6	Diarmuid Connolly	St Vincent's	2-09	15	5	3.00
6	Brian Looney	Dr Crokes	1-12	15	4	3.75
7	Paul Devlin	Kilcoo	2-07	13	3	4.66
7	John Heslin	St Loman's	1-10	13	2	6.50

In a single game

Rank	Player	Club	Tally	Total	Opposition
1	Diarmuid Connolly	St Vincent's	2-05	11	Castlebar Mitchels
1	Tomás Quinn	St Vincent's	1-08	11	Summerhill
1	Tomás Quinn	St Vincent's	1-08	11	Ballinderry Shamrocks
2	Séamus Quigley	Roslea Shamrocks	1-07	10	Ballinagh
3	Craig Rogers	Portlaoise	2-03	9	St Vincent's
3	John Heslin	St Loman's	1-06	9	Old Leighlin
3	Brian Looney	Dr Crokes	1-06	9	Loughmore–Castleiney
4	Paul Devlin	Kilcoo	2-02	8	Crossmaglen Rangers
4	Tomás Quinn	St Vincent's	0-08	8	Portlaoise
5	Colin Kelly	Glenswilly	2-01	7	Roslea Shamrocks
5	Collie Devlin	Ballinderry Shamrocks	2-01	7	Kingdom Kerry Gaels
5	Séamus Quigley	Roslea Shamrocks	1-04	7	Glenswilly
5	Cathal Coughlan	Old Leighlin	1-04	7	St Loman's
5	John McGrath	Loughmore–Castleiney	1-04	7	Dr Crokes
5	Michael Murphy	Glenswilly	1-04	7	St Gall's
5	Tomás Quinn	St Loman's	0-07	7	Portlaoise
