= 2015 All-Ireland Junior Football Championship =

Championship Details
- Dates: 6 May – 8 August 2015
- Teams: 19

All Ireland Champions
- Winners: Kerry (16th win)
- Captain: Alan O'Donoghue
- Manager: Stephen Wallace

All Ireland Runners-up
- Runners-up: Mayo
- Captain: Cathal Freeman
- Manager: Seán McLoughlin

Provincial Champions
- Munster: Kerry
- Leinster: Wexford
- Ulster: Not Played
- Connacht: Mayo

Championship Statistics
- Matches Played: 18
- Total Goals: 40 (2.22 per game)
- Total Points: 436 (24.22 per game)
- Top Scorer: Conor Cox (3-15)

The 2015 All-Ireland Junior Football Championship was the 85th staging of the All-Ireland Junior Championship since its establishment by the Gaelic Athletic Association in 1912. The competition ran from 6 May to 8 August 2015.

Cavan entered the championship as the defending champions, however, they were beaten by Louth n the Leinster quarter-final.

The All-Ireland final was played on 8 August 2015 at Croke Park in Dublin, between Kerry and Mayo, in what was their third ever meeting in the final and a first in three years. Kerry won the match by 2–18 to 0–10 to claim their 16th championship title overall and a first tile in three.

Kerry's Conor Cox was the championship's top scorer with 3-15.

== Connacht Junior Football Championship ==
=== Connacht semi-finals ===
6 May 2015 Semi-final	Leitrim	0-07 - 1-11	Galway	Páirc Seán Mac Diarmada
		Report

6 May 2015 Semi-final	Mayo	2-10 - 1-10	Sligo	James Stephens Park
	A Farrell 1-4 (0-1f), E O'Donoghue 1-0, G Conway 0-2, C Freeman, D Joyce, M Barrett, D McGing 0-1 each.	Report	C McGee 0-5 (1f), S Ross 1-0, V Frizell 0-2, M Daly, P Clarke, B Egan 0-1 each.	Referee: E O'Grady (Leitrim)

=== Connacht final ===
17 May 2015 Final	Mayo	1-12 - 0-13	Galway	Páirc Seán Mac Diarmada
	A Farrell (1-2, 0-1'45), D McGing (0-4f), D Durcan (0-1), D Joyce (0-1), C Horan (0-1), S Gaughan (0-1), D McHugh (0-1), M Forde (0-1f).	Report	P Whelehan (0-4, 2f), P Cooke (0-3f), E Tierney (0-3), M Redington (0-1), R Fahy (0-1); P E Seoighe (0-1).	Referee: P Daly

== Leinster Junior Football Championship ==
=== Leinster quarter-finals ===
20 May 2015 Quarter-final	Louth	1-19 - 1-18 (aet)	Cavan	Drogheda Park
	R Holcroft 1-7 (1-0pen, 0-5fs), P Kirwan, G McSorley, D Maguire, C McKeever 0-2 each, J McEneaney, D O'Connor, D McComish, W Woods 0-1 each.	Report	C Madden 1-8 (0-4fs, 0-1 '45'), T Moore (1f), E Henry (1f), S Tierney, D Sexton 0-2 each, M Cunningham, L Murphy 0-1 each.	Referee: P Maguire (Longford)

20 May 2015 Quarter-final	Longford	2-09 - 0-10	KIldare	Pearse Park
	A Dalton 1-1, D Gallagher 0-4fs, V Hourican 1-0, C Shields 0-2, L Moran (f), F Sheridan 0-1 each.	Report	C Bolton 0-4 (2fs), S Hanafin 0-3fs, J Acton, N Devane, A O'Neill 0-1 each.	Referee: D Fedigan (Wicklow)

20 May 2015 Quarter-final	Wexford	3-18 - 0-06	Wicklow	Bellefield Grounds
	C Sinnott 0-8 (5fs, 1 '45'), C Redmond 2-1, G Carty 1-0, N Hughes, N Harney, J Carty (2fs) 0-2 each, S Byrne, K Rowe, L Devereux 0-1 each.	Report	P Byrne 0-3 (2fs), P Cronin 0-2fs, E Woulfe 0-1.	Referee: D Hickey (Carlow)

26 May 2015 Quarter-final	Meath	4-19 - 0-08	Carlow	Seán Eiffe Park
	C Kelly 2-3, C Lynch 1-3, K Ross 1-1, D Quinn 0-3, A Farrell, J Finnerty 0-2 each, W Carry, S Crosby, D McNamara, C O'Brien, B O'Brien 0-1 each.	Report	C Blake, L Walker 0-2 each; S Doyle, N Quinlan, J Ryan, D Thompson 0-1 each.

=== Leinster semi-finals ===
10 June 2015 Semi-final	Longford	0-12 - 3-11	Wexford	Pearse Park
	D Gallagher (0-5, 2f, 1'45), P Kiernan (0-3), L Moran (0-2, 1f), F Sheridan (0-1), V Hourican (0-1).	Report	K Rowe (3-0), N Harney (0-5, 4f), C Redmond (0-2), P O'Keeffe (0-1), S Gaul (0-1), R Vallejo (0-1); D Murphy (0-1).	Referee: D Moore

10 June 2015 Semi-final	Louth	0-16 - 2-11	Meath	Drogheda Park
	J Califf 0-6; R Holcroft 0-6, J McEneaney 0-2, C McKeever 0-1, J Agnew 0-1.	Report	K Ross 1-3, C Lynch 0-6, B O'Brien 1-0, C O'Connor 0-1, S Crosby 0-1.

=== Leinster final ===
25 June 2015 Final	Wexford	1-10 - 0-12	Meath	Wexford Park
	J Carty 1-1; C Sinnott 0-6 (3fs), N Harney (f), G Carty, L Devereux 0-1 each.	Report	C Kelly 0-4, C Lynch (2f), D Quinn 0-3 each, D McNamara, K Ross (f) 0-1 each.	Referee: B Cawley (Kildare)

== Munster Junior Football Championship ==
=== Munster quarter-finals ===
23 May 2015 Quarter-final	Clare	3-07 - 1-15	Limerick	Cusack Park
	J Downes (2-0), P O’Malley (1-4) 1-0 pen, 0-3 f’s, K Malone, M Duffy (f), C Devitt (0-1) each.	Report	S O Carroll (1-5), 0-1 f, J Barry Murphy (0-3)0 -2 f’s, J Mullins (0-3), K Ryan (0-2), T McCarthy. T McMahon (0-1) each.

31 May 2015 Quarter-final	Tipperary	1-12 - 1-09	Waterford	Semple Stadium
	D Lonergan (1-3, 0-1f), K Fox (0-4, 1f), A Matassa (0-2), M Dunne (0-1); D McEnroe (0-1f), T Sweeney (0-1).	Report	D Power (0-5, 3f); Dylan Guiry (1-0), J Curry (0-3, 1f), G Hurney (0-1f).	Referee: R Moloney

=== Munster semi-finals ===
14 June 2015 Semi-final	Tipperary	1-08 - 2-13	Kerry	Semple Stadium
	K Fox 0-4 (3f), D McEnroe 1-0, A Matassa and D Lonergan 0-2 (1f, 1 '45) each.	Report	T Hickey 1-2 (2f), D O'Donoghue 1-0, J O'Donoghue 0-4, A O'Donoghue 0-3, C Cox 0-2, J Walsh & L Carey 0-1 each.	Referee: M Collins (Cork)

14 June 2015 Semi-final	Cork	0-16 - 0-13	Limerick	Páirc Uí Rinn
	S Hickey, A Barry 0-4 each, M Sugrue (0-1f) 0-3, S Kiely 0-2, J Corkery, B Coughlan, A O'Connor 0-1 each.	Report	J Barry-Murphy 0-5 (3f), M Lyons, J Mullins (0-2f) 0-3 each, S O'Carroll, K Ryan 0-1 each.	Referee: A Kissane (Waterford)

=== Munster final ===
2 July 2015 Final	Cork	0-11 - 1-20	Kerry	Páirc Uí Rinn
	M Sugrue (0-4, 3 frees), M O Laoire (0-2), C Brosnan, S Hickey, B Coughlan, S Kiely, P. Condon (0-1 each).	Report	C Cox (1-7, 1-0 pen, 1 free, 1 45), J O’Donoghue (0-6), B Crowley, T Hickey (0-2 each), A. O’Donoghue, G.O’Sullivan, E Kiely (0-1 each).	Referee: A Kissane (Waterford)

== All-Ireland Junior Football Championship ==
=== All-Ireland semi-finals ===
25 July 2015 Semi-final	Mayo	1-12 - 0-08	Kilkenny	Breffni Park
	D McGing (1-3, 1 free), G Conway (0-4), R Malee (0-3), J Hutton and C Freeman (0-1 each).	Report	M Malone and C Roche (frees) (0-2 each), P Donnelly, M Bolger (45), P McConigley and Conor McDonald (0-1 each).

25 July 2015 Semi-final	Kerry	3-13 - 2-09	Wexford	Fraher Field
	C Cox (2-4, 4 frees); K Spillane (1-0); P O’Connor (0-3); B O’Sullivan (0-2); T Hickey, L Kearney, J O’Donoghue, J Walsh (0-1 each).	Report	P Barden (1-1); M Dwyer (1-0); D Shanley (0-3, 3 frees); N Harney (0-2); C Redmond, D Murphy, M Forde (0-1 each).	Referee: J Bermingham (Cork)

=== All-Ireland final ===
8 August 2015 Final	Kerry	2-18 - 0-10	Mayo	Croke Park
	T Hickey 2-4 (1f), A O'Donoghue 0-4, B Crowley, C Cox (2f) 0-2 each, K Spillane, P O'Connor, J Walsh, T Morley, S Murphy ('45), J O'Donoghue 0-1 each.		A Farrell 0-5 (2f), D McGing, C Freeman, E Collins, E O'Donoghue, D Healy 0-1 each	Referee: N Mooney (Cavan)

== Championship statistics ==
=== Top scorers ===
Overall

Rank	Player	Club	Tally	Total	Matches	Average
1	Conor Cox	Kerry	3-15	24	4	6.00
2	Thomas Hickey	Kerry	3-09	18	4	4.50
3	Andrew Farrell	Mayo	2-11	17	3	5.66
4	Ronan Holcroft	Louth	1-13	16	2	8.00
5	Ciarán Lynch	Meath	1-12	15	3	5.00
6	Conor Sinnott	Wexford	0-14	14	3	4.66
7	Ciarán Kelly	Meath	2-07	13	2	6.50
8	Diarmuid McGing	Mayo	1-09	12	4	3.00
8	Jeff O'Donoghue	Kerry	0-12	12	4	3.00
10	Kevin Ross	Meath	2-05	11	3	3.66
10	Conor Madden	Cavan	1-08	11	1	11.00

In a single game

Rank	Player	Club	Tally	Total	Opposition
1	Conor Madden	Cavan	1-08	11	Louth
2	Conor Cox	Kerry	2-04	10	Wexford
2	Thomas Hickey	Kerry	2-04	10	Mayo
2	Ronan Holcroft	Louth	1-07	10	Cavan
2	Conor Cox	Kerry	1-07	10	Cork
6	Kevin Rowe	Wexford	3-00	9	Longford
6	Ciarán Kelly	Meath	2-03	9	Carlow
8	Seán O'Carroll	Limerick	1-05	8	Clare
8	Conor Sinnott	Wexford	0-08	8	Wicklow
10	Ciarán Redmond	Wexford	2-01	7	Wicklow
10	Paddy O'Malley	Clare	1-04	7	Limerick
10	Andrew Farrell	Mayo	1-04	7	Sligo
