= 2000 Kerry Senior Football Championship =

Gaelic football competition

- Dates: 11 June - 26 November 2000
- Teams: 19
- Sponsor: Allied Irish Bank
- Champions: Dr. Crokes (6th title); Roland Neher (captain); Harry O'Neill (manager)
- Runners-up: An Ghaeltacht; Roibeárd Mac Gearailt (captain); Séamus Mac Gearailt (manager)

Tournament statistics
- Matches played: 19
- Goals scored: 31 (1.63 per match)
- Points scored: 356 (18.74 per match)
- Top scorer(s): Dara Ó Cinnéide (3-20)

The 2000 Kerry Senior Football Championship was the 100th staging of the Kerry Senior Football Championship since its establishment by the Kerry County Board in 1889. The draw for the opening round fixtures took place on May 9, 2000. The championship ran from 11 June to 26 November 2000.

East Kerry entered the championship as the defending champions, however, they were beaten by West Kerry in the first round.

The final was played on 26 November 2000 at Austin Stack Park in Tralee, between Dr. Crokes and An Ghaeltacht, in what was their first ever meeting in the final. Dr. Crokes won the match by 1-04 to 0-06 to claim their sixth championship title overall and a first title in nine years.

West Kerry's Dara Ó Cinnéide was the championship's top scorer with 3-20.

== Results ==
=== Preliminary round ===
11 June 2000 Preliminary round	Shannon Rangers	0-13 - 1-12	Mid Kerry	Ballylongford Grounds
	E Hennessy 0-6, L Weir 0-5, B Bambury 0-1, D Kiely 0-1.		S O'Sullivan 0-7, J Daly 1-2, K Foley 0-3.

11 June 2000 Preliminary round	Dr. Crokes	0-13 - 0-08	Killarney Legion	FitzGerald Stadium
	R Neher 0-3, T Fleming 0-3, B Clarke 0-2, V Cooper 0-1, J Sparling 0-1, Mike Cooper 0-1, E Brosnan 0-1, P O'Shea 0-1.		C O'Grady 0-3, D O'Mahony 0-2, S Hegarty 0-2, D Culloty 0-1.

11 June 2000 Preliminary round	West Kerry	2-12 - 1-05	Kenmare	Páirc an Aghasaigh
	G Farrell 2-3, E Kennedy 0-4, J Ferriter 0-3, F Ashe 0-1, A Lynch 0-1.		T Carey 1-0, K Moriarty 0-2, J O'Sullivan 0-2, TP O'Connor 0-1.

=== Round 1 ===
30 June 2000 Round 1	Feale Rangers	0-17 - 0-07	John Mitchels	Frank Sheehy Park
	N Kennelly 0-5, B Scanlon 0-3, E Galvin 0-3, J Mulvihill 0-1, M Kearney 0-1, J Corridan 0-1, L Keane 0-1, E Fitzmaurice 0-1, J Stack 0-1.		J Fitzgerald 0-2, M Dennehy 0-2, A Moynihan 0-2, F O'Brien 0-1.

30 June 2000 Round 1	Rathmore	0-11 - 0-06	Castleisland Desmonds	Rathbeg Grounds
	J Murphy 0-5, D Fitzgerald 0-2, D O'Keeffe 0-2, T Cronin 0-1, K O'Keeffe 0-1.		J Brennan 0-3, M Horgan 0-2, T Broderick 0-1.

1 July 2000 Round 1	St. Brendan's	1-04 - 2-10	Mid Kerry	Ardfert Grounds
	G Hussey 1-1, E Ferris 0-2, K Linehan 0-1.		K Foley 2-3, J Daly 0-2, W Harmon 0-2, M Burke 0-1, S O'Sullivan 0-1, K O'Connor 0-1.

1 July 2000 Round 1	West Kerry	1-10 - 1-10	East Kerry	Páirc an Aghasaigh
	S Geaney 1-2, G Farrell 0-3, J Ferriter 0-2, S O'Mahony 0-1, A Lynch 0-1, D Heaseman 0-1.		P O'Donoghue 1-5, S Moynigan 0-1, L Murphy 0-1, S Óg Leary 0-1, J Crowley 0-1, D O'Donoghue 0-1.

27 July 2000 Round 1 replay	West Kerry	2-15 - 1-11	East Kerry	FitzGerald Stadium
	S Geaney 2-3, G Farrell 0-4, J Ferriter 0-3, A O'Connor 0-1, T Griffin 0-1, S O'Mahony 0-1, C Geaney 0-1, D Heaseman 0-1.		L Murphy 1-1, P O'Donoghue 0-4, J Crowley 0-2, D O'Donoghue 0-1, B Doolan 0-1, P Kennedy 0-1, D O'Sullivan 0-1.

28 July 2000 Round 1	Kilcummin	1-09 - 0-08	Austin Stacks	FitzGerald Stadium
	M O'Connor 1-2, DJ Fleming 0-3, S O'Leary 0-2, M O'Leary 0-1, R O'Connor 0-1.		JP O'Neill 0-2, B Sheehan 0-2, P Costelloe 0-2, M Collins 0-1, W Quinlan 0-1.

29 July 2000 Round 1	Kerins O'Rahilly's	3-06 - 1-11	Laune Rangers	Austin Stack Park
	E McGrath 2-1, D Quill 0-5, G Molloy 1-0.		MF Russell 0-4, B O'Sullivan 1-0, L Hassett 0-2, P O'Sullivan 0-2, B O'Shea 0-1, J O'Shea 0-1, J Edward Murphy 0-1.

30 July 2000 Round 1	South Kerry	1-06 - 1-09	Dr. Crokes	Waterville
	M Fitzgerald 0-4, K Moran 1-0, J Shanahan 0-1, D O'Dwyer 0-1.		R Neher 0-4, C Cooper 1-0, P O'Shea 0-2, M Cooper 0-1, D Moloney 0-1, J Fleming 0-1.

30 July 2000 Round 1	St. Kieran's	0-11 - 1-09	An Ghaeltacht	Cordal Grounds
	S McElligott 0-7, L Brosnan 0-2, EJ O'Donoghue 0-1, D Dennehy 0-1.		D Ó Cinnéide 1-5, P Ó Cuinn 0-1, D Ó Flatharta 0-1, JJ Corduff 0-1, C Ó Crualaoich 0-1.

=== Quarter-finals ===
21 October 2000 Quarter-final	Kerins O'Rahilly's	0-09 - 0-08	Feale Rangers	Austin Stack Park
	D Quill 0-5, J O'Connor 0-2, JW O'Connor 0-1, G Molloy 0-1.		E Bowler 0-2, B Scanlon 0-2, D Galvin 0-1, E Galvin 0-1, P Summers 0-1, T Kennelly 0-1.

15 October 2000 Quarter-final	An Ghaeltacht	2-14 - 1-07	Kilcummin	Austin Stack Park
	D Ó Cinnéide 2-7, C Ó Cruadhlaioch 0-2, A Mac Gearailt 0-2, P Ó Cuinn 0-1, T Ó Conchúir 0-1, C Ó Dubhda 0-1.		DJ Fleming 0-6, E O'Donoghue 1-0, M O'Connor 0-1.

15 October 2000 Quarter-final	West Kerry	1-11 - 1-09	Mid Kerry	Austin Stack Park
	G Farrell 1-5, S Geaney 0-1, S O'Mahony 0-1, A O'Connor 0-1, A Lynch 0-1, C Geaney 0-1, D Heaseman 0-1.		I Twiss 1-1, S O'Sullivan 0-4, K Foley 0-1, G McGrath 0-1, E O'Malley 0-1, M Burke 0-1.

22 October 2000 Quarter-final	Dr. Crokes	2-10 - 0-11	Rathmore	FitzGerald Stadium
	R Neher 0-5, C Murphy 1-0, J Fleming 1-0, D Moloney 0-3, V Casey 0-1, L Madden 0-1.		J Murphy 0-3, D O'Keeffe 0-2, MD Cahill 0-2, J Buckley 0-1, E Doherty 0-1, P Murphy 0-1, K O'Keeffe 0-1.

=== Semi-finals ===
22 October 2000 Semi-final	An Ghaeltacht	0-11 - 0-08	Kerins O'Rahilly's	Austin Stack Park
	D Ó Cinnéide 0-5, JJ Corduff 0-2, C Ó Dubhda 0-1, C Ó Cruadhlaioch 0-1, P Ó Cuinn 0-1, R Mac Gearailt 0-1.		D Quill 0-4, J O'Connor 0-2, M Quirke 0-1, E McGrath 0-1.

22 October 2000 Semi-final	Dr. Crokes	1-08 - 1-07	West Kerry	Austin Stack Park
	R Neher 0-4, C Murphy 1-0, L Madden 0-1, P O'Shea 0-1, M Cooper 0-1, V Casey 0-1.		A O'Connor 1-0, S Geaney 0-2, G Farrell 0-1, F Ashe 0-1, S O'Mahony 0-1, C Geaney 0-1, J Ferriter 0-1.

=== Final ===
26 November 2000 Final	Dr. Crokes	1-04 - 0-06	An Ghaeltacht	Austin Stack Park
	E Brosnan 1-0, R Neher 0-2, C Cooper 0-1, P O'Shea 0-1.		D Ó Cinnéide 0-3, R Mac Gearailt 0-1, A Mac Gearailt 0-1, C Ó Cruadhlaioch 0-1.	Referee: D Donovan (Desmonds)

== Championship statistics ==
=== Top scorers ===
Overall

Rank	Player	Club	Tally	Total	Matches	Average
1	Dara Ó Cinnéide	An Ghaeltacht	3-20	29	4	7.25
2	Gene Farrell	West Kerry	3-16	25	5	5.00
3	Roland Neher	Dr. Crokes	0-18	18	5	3.60
4	Seán Geaney	West Kerry	3-08	17	5	3.60
5	Declan Quill	Kerins O'Rahilly's	0-14	14	3	4.66
6	Kieran Foley	Mid Kerry	2-07	13	3	4.33
7	Paud O'Donoghue	East Kerry	1-09	12	2	6.00
7	Seán O'Sullivan	Mid Kerry	0-12	12	4	3.00
9	Jack Ferriter	West Kerry	0-09	9	5	1.80
9	D. J. Fleming	Kilcummin	0-09	9	5	1.80

In a single game

Rank	Player	Club	Tally	Total	Opposition
1	Dara Ó Cinnéide	An Ghaeltacht	2-07	13	Kilcummin
2	Kieran Foley	Mid Kerry	2-03	9	St. Brendan's
2	Seán Geaney	West Kerry	2-03	9	East Kerry
2	Gene Farrell	West Kerry	2-03	9	Kenmare
5	Paud O'Donoghue	East Kerry	1-05	8	West Kerry
5	Dara Ó Cinnéide	An Ghaeltacht	1-05	8	St. Kieran's
5	Gene Farrell	West Kerry	1-05	8	Mid Kerry
8	Eugene McGrath	Kerins O'Rahilly's	2-01	7	Laune Rangers
8	Seán O'Sullivan	Mid Kerry	0-07	7	Shannon Rangers
8	Seán McElligott	St. Kierna's	0-07	7	An Ghaeltacht

=== Miscellaneous ===
- Dr. Crokes won a first title in nine years.
- An Ghaeltacht qualified for the final for the very first time.
- Glenflesk play in the Munster Senior Club Football Championship after winning the once off Millennium Cup.
