= James O'Shea =

Irish Gaelic footballer

Personal information
- Native name: Séamus Ó Sé (Irish)
- Born: County Kerry, Ireland

Sport
- Sport: Gaelic football
- Position: Forward
Club
- Years: Club
- St. Michael's/Foilmore Bishopstown
Inter-county
- Years: County
- 1990's 2002-200?: Kerry, Cork
Inter-county titles
- [[Munster Bishopstown Senior Football Championship|Munster Bishopstown titles]]: 1
- All Stars: 0

James O'Shea was a former footballer from County Kerry. He was a star of many Kerry underage teams in the 90's. He also played with the Cork team winning a Munster Championship as a sub in 2002.

== Club ==
At club level, he has played with his home club St. Michael's/Foilmore and has had much success winning County and Munster Intermediate Championships in 2008 and then added an All Ireland in 2009. He also helped the club win its first South Kerry Championship in 2007, and won a second in 2008. He also played with Cork side Bishopstown he never won a County Championship with them but did play in a final in 2004.

== Schools ==
O'Shea won an All-Ireland Vocational Schools Championship with the Kerry Vocational Schools team in 1993.

== Minor ==
O' Shea played with the Kerry minor team in 1993. He had little success as his side lost out to Cork.

He was underage again in 1994 and had more success. Wins over Limerick, where O' Shea scored a goal, and Cork, where he scored 1-02, seen Kerry qualify for a Munster final with Clare. In the final another goal from O' Shea helped his side to a 2–11 to 3–05 win and a Munster title for O' Shea. Kerry faced Ulster champions Armagh in the All-Ireland semi-final, where O'Shea was again amount the scorers with a point in a 2–10 to 0–09 win. In the All-Ireland final O' Sheas side faced Galway. He hit two points in a 0–16 to 1–07 win and an All-Ireland medal.

== Under 21 ==
O' Shea joined the counties Under 21 team in 1995 straight out of the minor grade. He played in wins over Clare, scoring a point, and Limerick. scoring two points, to book a Munster final spot. In the final Kerry faced Waterford, a game where O' Shea scored a point in a 1–21 to 2–05 win. He played no part in the subsequent All-Ireland series.

He again part of the team in 1996. Wins over Waterford, scoring three points, and Cork, in a game that was the only of his Under 21 career that he failed to score in, seen Kerry book another Munster final. This time around O' Shea and co faced Clare, he played a big role in a 3–14 to 0–08 win as his 2-01 seen him win his second Munster title. He scored a point in a 3–09 to 0–12 win in the All-Ireland semi-final against Galway. In the All-Ireland final Kerry faced Ulster champions Cavan. A point from O' Shea seen the Kingdom take a second title in a row on a 1–17 to 2-10 scoreline and an All-Ireland medal for O' Shea.

O' Shea was again underage in 1997 and was by now one of the teams leading forwards. Wins over Limerick and Clare, games where O' Shea scored two points in both, seen a third final in a row for O' Shea and Kerry. In the final Kerry faced Cork. O' Shea scored a point in a 2–11 to 3-08 scoreline. In the replay O' Shea scored two points as he picked up a third Munster title after a 0–12 to 1-07 scoreline. In the All-Ireland semi-final Kerry faced Leinster champions Meath. Despite two points from O'Shea the Kingdom lost out by a point on a 0–14 to 0-13 scoreline in his last game in the Under 21 grade.

== Junior ==
O' Shea had a short career with the Kerry Junior team. His only appearance was a Munster semi-final loss to Clare in 1999.

== Senior ==
Kerry

On the back of his underage displays O' Shea was brought into the Kerry senior team and played five games during the 1995–96 National Football League

He again played five games during the 1996–97 National Football League.

After a few seasons away he returned to the panel during the 1998–99 National Football League. He appeared in a novel pairing with Kilkenny. Despite being jut 23 it was his last senior game with Kerry.

Cork

Having been living, working and playing his club football in Cork for a number of years he joined the Cork senior team. He won a Munster Senior Football Championship medal as a member of the panel who overcame Tipperary in the final. He would make a number of appearances in the 2003 National League.
