= Craig Rogers =

Irish Gaelic footballer (born 1986)

Personal information
- Nickname: Rodgie
- Born: 9 May 1986 (age 40) Portlaoise, Republic of Ireland
- Height: 5 ft (1.5 m)

Sport
- Sport: Gaelic football
- Position: Centre Half Forward
Club
- Years: Club
- 2003-2020: Portlaoise
Club titles
- Laois titles: 14 clprovince=2
Inter-county
- Years: County
- 4 Leinster 1 All Ireland 1 Dublin Club: Laois
Inter-county titles
- Leinster titles: 8

Craig Rogers is a Gaelic footballer from Portlaoise in County Laois.

He plays in attack and in 2003 was captain of the Laois team that won the All-Ireland Minor Football Championship title for the first time since 1997.

In 2004, he was captain of the minor team which won the Leinster Minor Football Championship and in 2006 and 2007, he was part of the Laois teams that won the Leinster U21 Football Championship. In 2004 he won a Laois Senior Football Championship title and also a Leinster Senior Club Football Championship title with Portlaoise.

In 2006, Rogers was on the team UCD won Dublin Senior Football Championship title and Portlaoise win the Laois Under 21 Football Championship for the second consecutive year.

In 2007, he featured in the attack as Portlaoise won the Laois Senior Football Championship title and again featured as Portlaoise retained their titles in '08 and 09.

Rogers began his club career with Ballyroan before transferring to the Portlaoise. He has also represented Ireland in the u18 International Rules Series in Australia - April 2004.

Rogers has won two Laois Minor Football Championship titles, three Laois Under 21 Football Championship titles, 10 Laois Senior Football Championship titles and 2 Leinster Senior Club Football Championship titles with his club Portlaoise.

== Honours ==
- 12 Laois Senior Football Championship 2004, 2007, 2008, 2009, 2010, 2011, 2012, 2013, 2014, 2015, 2017, 2018
- 7 Laois All-County Football League 2004, 2007, 2008, 2009, 2011, 2012, 2014
- 2 Leinster Senior Club Football Championship 2004, 2009
- 2 Leinster Under-21 Football Championship 2006, 2007
- 2 Laois Under-21 Football Championship 2005, 2006
- 2 Laois Minor Football Championship 2002, 2003
- 1 Dublin Senior Football Championship 2006
- 1 Leinster Minor Football Championship 2004
