= Barry John Keane =

Irish Gaelic footballer

Personal information
- Native name: Barra Seán Ó Catháin (Irish)
- Born: 1 May 1990 (age 36) Tralee, Ireland
- Occupation: Printer
- Height: 1.78 m (5 ft 10 in)

Sport
- Sport: Gaelic Football
- Position: Left Corner Forward
Clubs
- Years: Club
- 2007- 2024-: Kerins O'Rahilly's → St Brendan's (Divisional)
Club titles
- Munster titles: 1
Inter-county
- Years: County
- 2010-2018: Kerry
Inter-county titles
- Munster titles: 4
- All-Irelands: 1
- NFL: 0
- All Stars: 0

Barry John Keane (born 1 May 1990) is an Irish Gaelic footballer with Kerry GAA and has played with them at minor Under 21 and senior level. He is the grandson of the famous former Kerry player John Dowling. He plays with the Kerins O'Rahilly's club in Tralee. Barry John made his Championship debut for Kerry against Tipperary in 2010 at Semple Stadium. Barry John retired from senior inter-county football in 2018.

Honours One All-Ireland Senior Championship title, in 2014 v Donegal.
