= Conor Cox =

Irish Gaelic footballer

Personal information
- Born: 1992 (age 33–34) Luton, United Kingdom
- Occupation: Sales rep

Sport
- Sport: Gaelic football
- Position: Full-forward
Clubs
- Years: Club
- 2010–2018 2011–2018 2019–present: Listowel Emmets → Feale Rangers; Éire Óg
Club titles
- Roscommon titles: 0
College
- Years: College
- 2011–2016: University College Cork
College titles
- Sigerson titles: 1
Inter-county*
| Years | County | Apps (scores) |
| 2013–2016 2019–present | Kerry; Roscommon | 0 (0-00); 16 (0–45) |
Inter-county titles
- Connacht titles: 1
- All-Irelands: 0
- NFL: 0
- All Stars: 0
- *Inter County team apps and scores correct as of 15:51, 29 July 2023.

Conor Cox (born 1992) is an Irish Gaelic footballer. At club level he plays with Éire Óg, having previously lined out with Listowel Emmets and Feale Rangers, and at inter-county level with the Roscommon senior football team.

== Career ==
Cox first played Gaelic football at juvenile and underage levels with the Listowel Emmets club. After progressing to adult level, he won North Kerry SFC medals in 2013 and 2015. His performances at club level also saw him called up to the Feale Rangers divisional team. Cox also lined out with University College Cork and was part of their Sigerson Cup-winning team in 2014.

Cox first appeared on the inter-county scene with Kerry during unsuccessful spells with the minor and under-21 teams. He later spent several season with the junior team and won All-Ireland JFC medals in 2012, 2015 and 2017. Cox was drafted onto the Kerry senior football team in 2013 and made a number of National League appearances. His decision to spend the summer in the United States during the team's All-Ireland SFC-winning season in 2014 hastened the end of his inter-county career with Kerry.

Cox transferred to the Éire Óg club in County Roscommon in 2019, a move which made him eligible for the county team. He was part of the Roscommon team that won the Conancht SFC title in 2019.

== Honours ==
University College Cork

- Sigerson Cup: 2014

Kerry

- All-Ireland Junior Football Championship: 2012, 2015, 2017
- Munster Junior Football Championship: 2012, 2015, 2017

Roscommon

- Connacht Senior Football Championship: 2019
