= David Geaney (Kerry Gaelic footballer, born 1985) =

Kerry Gaelic footballer

Personal information
- Native name: Daithí Ó Geibheannaigh (Irish)
- Born: 1985 (age 40–41) County Kerry, Ireland
- Height: 6 ft 2 in (188 cm)

Sport
- Sport: Gaelic football
- Position: Half/Full Forward
Clubs
- Years: Club
- 2002-2012 2013-2015 2015-: An Daingean; St Peters Dunboyne; An Daingean
Inter-county
Years	County	Apps (scores)
2011 - 2012	Kerry	1 (0-01)
Inter-county titles
- Munster titles: 1
- All-Irelands: 0
- NFL: 0
- All Stars: 0

David Geaney (born 1985 in County Kerry) is an Irish Gaelic footballer, formerly playing for Kerry and An Daingean and playing for St Peters Dunboyne since 2013.

== Playing career ==
=== Schools ===
Geaney first became known while playing with Dingle CBS.

=== Club ===
At club level, he helped Dingle win the Intermediate county title with a win over West Kerry rivals Annascaul. He played in the Kerry Senior Football Championship, where Dingle lost to Dr Crokes in the final in 2012. He later joined Meath, playing for St Peters, Dunboyne.

=== Underage ===
In 2003, he was part of the Kerry minor team. That seasons Munster Minor Football Championship had a round-robin phase and Geaney played in the first three games against Tipperary scoring 0-03, Limerick scoring 1-01 and Waterford scoring 0-02. He returned for the semi-final with Clare where he scored 0-04. Kerry faced Cork in the final where he scored 0–02 to pick up a Munster medal. He failed to score as Kerry overcame Mayo in the All-Ireland quarter-final. He was limited to a single point as Kerry lost out to Laois in the All-Ireland semi-final.

He later moved on to the Under 21 team as a panel member but had little success as Kerry lost out to Cork in both 2005 and 2006.

=== Junior ===
He was part of the county Junior side in 2005. His first appearance was in the semi-final win over Limerick where he scored a point. He also appeared in the subsequent Munster final loss to Cork.

=== Senior ===
After a number of years away from intercounty football, he became part of the Kerry panel in 2011. He was part of the team that won the pre-season McGrath Cup after overcoming Clare in the final.

He made his first league appearance with 4 points against All-Ireland champions Cork, and went on to play 4 more games. He later made his championship debut against Limerick in the Munster semi-final. He played no part for the rest of the championship< including the All-Ireland final loss to Dublin.

He played in the 2012 McGrath Cup but left the panel before the start of the league.
