= St Michael's/Foilmore =

Gaelic football club in County Kerry, Ireland

- Naomh Micheál / An Fhaill Mhór
- Founded: 1976
- County: Kerry
- Nickname: Ballyfoilmore
- Colours: Green and red
- Grounds: Páirc Peile Naomh Mhichíl, Ballinskelligs
- Coordinates: 51°49′45.17″N 10°16′06.64″W

Playing kits
Standard colours

St Michael's/Foilmore is a Gaelic Athletic Association football club from South Kerry in County Kerry, Ireland.

== Roll of honour ==
Páirc Peile Naomh Mhichíl

- All-Ireland Intermediate Club Football Championship (1) 2009
- Munster Intermediate Club Football Championship: (1) 2008
- Munster Junior Club Football Championship: (1) 2001
- Kerry Intermediate Football Championship (1) 2008
- Kerry Junior Football Championship (1) 2001
- Kerry Novice Football Championship (2) 1998, 2026
- Kerry County League Division 2: (1) 2007
- Kerry County League Division 4: (2) 1995, 2001
- Kerry County League Division 5: (2) 1994, 2022
- South Kerry Senior Football Championship: (4) 2007, 2008, 2012, 2013
- South Kerry Senior Football League: (7) 2003, 2007, 2008, 2009, 2010, 2012, 2022

== Former Kerry Senior players ==
- Mark Griffin - 2013 - 2019
- Adrian O'Connell - 2006 - 2011
- Ronan O'Connor - 2002 - 2006
- James O'Shea - 1996 - 1999
- Jerry O'Sullivan - 1983 - 1986

== All-Ireland winners ==
All-Ireland Senior Football Championship

- Mark Griffin (1): 2014
- Adrian O'Connell (1): 2006
- Ronan O'Connor (2): 2004, 2006

All-Ireland Under 21 Football Championship

- James O'Shea (2): 1995, 1996

All-Ireland Minor Football Championship

- James O'Shea (1): 1994

All-Ireland Vocational Schools

- James O'Shea (1): 1993

Hogan Cup

- Max Thiemann (1): 2009
- Mark Griffin (1): 2009
- Damien Kelly (1): 2009
- Eanna O'Connor (1): 2009

Preceded by Annascaul	Kerry Intermediate Football Championship; 2008	Succeeded by Spa
Preceded by Annascaul	Munster Intermediate Club Football Champions; 2008	Succeeded by Spa
Preceded by Moycullen	All-Ireland Intermediate Club Football Champions; 2009	Succeeded by Cookstown Fr. Rock's
