= Fitzgerald Stadium =

Sports stadium in County Kerry, Ireland

- Staid a' Ghearaltaigh
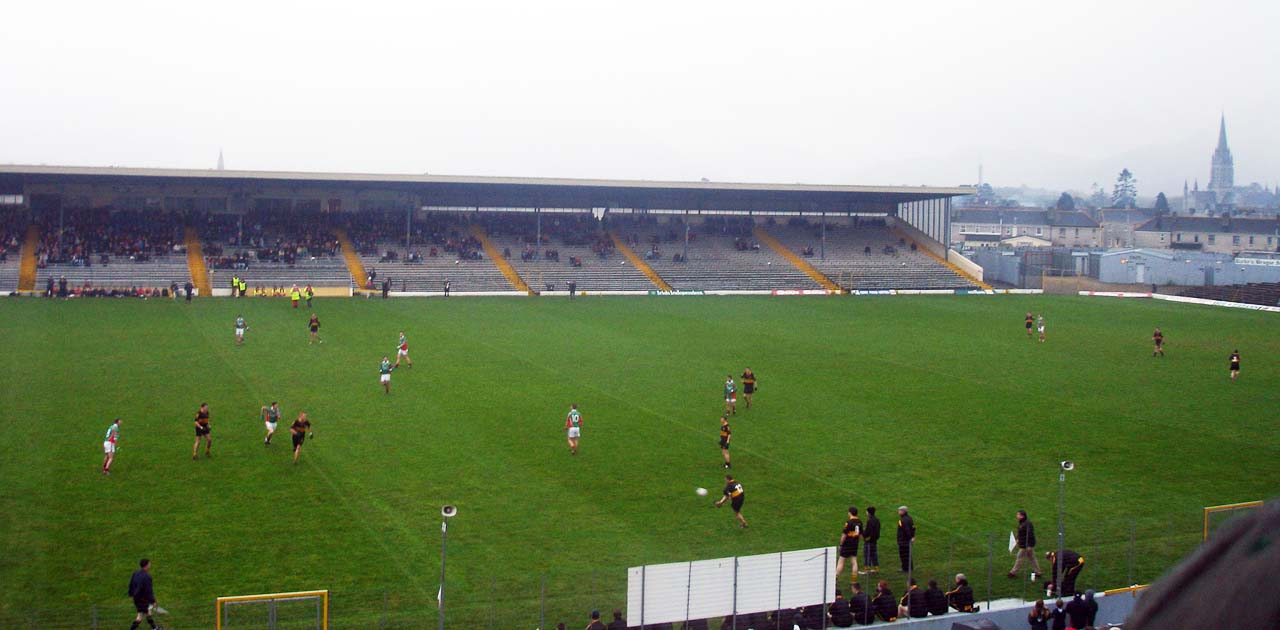
- Interactive map of Fitzgerald Stadium
- Location: Killarney, County Kerry, V93 P892, Ireland
- Coordinates: 52°3′59″N 9°30′29″W
- Owner: Kerry GAA
- Capacity: 38,000 Capacity history: 39,120 (1970–2009) 42,000 (2009–2013) 38,000 (9,000 seated) (2013–present)
- Surface: Grass
- Field size: 144 x 82 m
- Public transit: Killarney railway station

Construction
- Groundbreaking: 1930
- Opened: 1936; 90 years ago
- Renovated: 2008–2009
- Cost: £3,000 (original construction) €4.8 Million (2009 renovation)

Website
- fitzgeraldstadium.com

Fitzgerald Stadium (Irish: Staid a' Ghearaltaigh) is the principal GAA stadium in Killarney, Ireland, and is the home championship venue for the Kerry senior football team.

Named in honour of one of the first great players of the Gaelic Athletic Association, Dick Fitzgerald, Fitzgerald Stadium was officially opened on 31 May 1936 by Dr O'Brien, the then Bishop of Kerry, and J. M. Harty, Archbishop of Cashel.

== History ==
The attendance at its first match was at least 20,000, reputed to have been 28,000. Within one year, the new Killarney stadium was to host the All-Ireland Hurling Final between Tipperary and Kilkenny due to the unavailability of Croke Park because of the construction of the first Cusack Stand. The capacity of the ground was severely tested in 1950 when the stadium, unusually, hosted the Munster hurling final between Cork and Tipperary, when an estimated crowd of 50,000 turned up and in the closing stages large numbers of Cork supporters encroached on the pitch, making life difficult for Tipperary goalkeeper, Tony Reddan. The claustrophobic atmosphere prompted ace Tipperary defender John Doyle to remark that it was the first time he hurled in the midst of about 5,000.

Further developments took place at the stadium in the 1970s with the erection of the Dr O’Sullivan stand and a pavilion. All of this raised the capacity to 39,120. This stadium is regarded as one of the finest outside of Croke Park, situated under the gaze of the picturesque Kerry mountains.

In the winter of 2008–09 the first phase in the redevelopment was finished. Among the changes were the following:

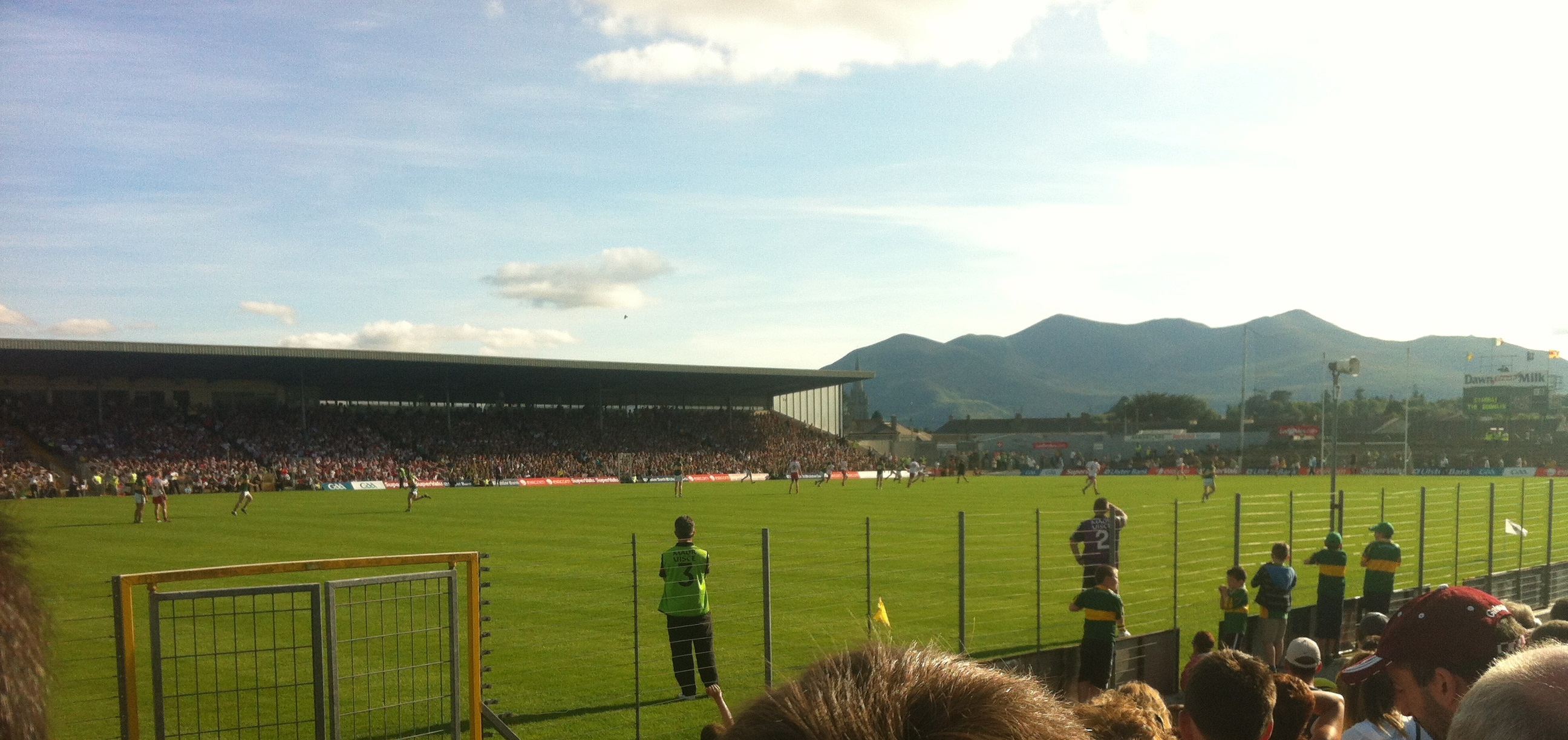
The stadium in 2012

- Extension of terracing at Lewis Rd end as far as the stand. The terracing is designed in such a way as to allow its continuation along the stand side if and when the stand is upgraded. Spectators enter new terracing through a tunnel at ground level or through stairways to the centre of the terrace.
- There is also additional entrance/exit stairs to the old terracing at the rear of the Lewis Rd goal.
- The new terracing accommodates an additional 4,000 spectators bringing stadium capacity to 43,000.
- There are 4 large dressing rooms underneath the new terrace with individual showering and toilet facilities. Each player has individual changing areas as in Croke Park.
- There was also provision for medical and physio staff as well as a separate area for mentors. Players now exit the dressing rooms via a tunnel.

There are 3 levels in all underneath the new terrace. Level 1 has the dressing rooms and shops at the rear of the terrace. Level 2 has very spacious meeting rooms for Stewards, Gardaí, Drug Testing and a Press Room for post-match interviews which has a stairway direct to the dressing room area. The top level, accessed by lift or stairs, is made up of a Control Tower for crowd control and monitoring and there is also a spacious room overlooking the pitch for TV match analysis. The main entrance area from Lewis Rd has been extended with facilities for selling match tickets on match day. On the stand side, there are new entrance/exit stairs at the scoreboard end of the stand. New wheelchair facilities are located in the stand with lift access. There is a new seating area for substitutes/mentors in the stand adjacent to the VIP area in the middle of the stand. The pitch itself is in absolute pristine condition following a six-month break from playing activity. All entrance areas adjacent to the new terracing have been tarmacked. The next phase of development will consist of new terracing at the scoreboard end.

On 15 November 2016, Fitzgerald Stadium was announced as one of 12 possible venues in Ireland to host the 2023 Rugby World Cup.

In late 2024, Kerry GAA have been awarded €6 million from the Large Scale Sport Infrastructure Fund (LSSIF) for upgrading the existing terrace at the score board end of Fitzgerald Stadium.

== Concerts ==
=== Tours ===
- Rod Stewart – 27 July 1991
- Westlife – 28 June 2002
- Elton John – 7 July 2002
- Counting Crows – 27 June 2003
- Bryan Adams – 25 June 2004
- The Corrs – 26 June 2004
- P!nk – 14 July 2007
- Westlife – 22 June 2008
- Pussycat Dolls – 18 July 2009

== See also ==
- List of Gaelic Athletic Association stadiums
- List of stadiums in Ireland by capacity
- Lists of stadiums

| Preceded by Croke Park; Dublin | All-Ireland Senior Hurling Championship; Final Venue; 1937 | Succeeded by Croke Park; Dublin |
