= Dian Hart =

American singer

- Born: Dian Erhardt
- Occupation: Singer
- Years active: 1950s - 1980s
- Labels: RCA Victor, Silver Cloud Records, Kerr Records, Amaret Records

Dian Hart was a singer and recording artist who recorded during 60s and early 1970s. In the late 60s, things looked promising for her. Cashbox Magazine once commented that she sounded like a teen version of Petula Clark. She was also a well known attraction on the broadway and supper club circuit who appeared at venues such as the Palmer House in Chicago, the Fontainebleau Hotel in Miami, and New York's Waldorf. She had also worked as an actor.

== Personal and family background ==
Dian Hart was born Dian Erhardt, the daughter Billy and Thelma Erhardt. Her father Billy was a dance teacher who ran the Billy V. Erhardt dance studio in Youngstown, Ohio and later the Billy Erhardt Dance Studios in Van Nuys, California. Her mother Thelma was an accomplished musician. Her parents met as a result of her mother answering an advert placed by her father. It was for a pianist to accompany him at his in Pittsburgh dance studio. Two years later they were married. Having moved to California, they opened the studio at 15317 Roscoe Blvd in 1967. During her parents career, they appeared as an act on the Steve Allen Show with him dancing and her playing the piano.

== Career ==
=== 1950s to 1960s ===
Her recording history goes back to 1957 or 1958 when at the age of 18, she recorded "I'll Wait" bw "Mama Worries" for RCA. The A side of the single, "I'll Wait" was written by her mother.

In 1963, she was appearing at the Mayfair Room at the Executive Inn in Houston. In November 1964, she appeared at Chicago's College Inn of the Sherman House with Paul Gilbert. By 1965, she had done a four-month tour of Australia and married a Los Angeles television producer. Also May that year had marked her fourth engagement at the La Fiesta Theater Restaurant in Juarez, appearing with the Rafael Ruiz dance trio. Because of the broadness of her appeal which included younger patrons, she was usually booked as an end of school attraction. However, by this time she had changed her singing style and appearance to a more mature sound and look with her sounding like a cross of Teresa Brewer and Judy Garland.

Already having been recognized as a well known singer and rising star, Hart appeared as a model for Ursula du Bois knitting articles in the Deseret News and The Blade in July 1966. In 1968 she starred in the Jet Set Revue at Las Vegas's Aladdin Hotel. Later that year, Hart was working in Toronto, and was spotted by Gib Kerr who was also the manager of Rich Little. A year later he had signed her on and had become her personal manager. It was reported in the Valley News October 8 edition that she had completed her first recording on the Silver Cloud label. As she had already recorded prior to this with "I'll Wait" bw "Mama Worries" as a teenaged Dian Erhardt in 1958, this recording would have been released as Dian Hart and on the Kerr Label, which was most likely named after her manager Gib Kerr. Ernie Freeman who had produced Nancy Ames single, "Something's Gotten Hold Of My Heart" for the Silver Cloud aka SC label also arranged both sides of her single, "Used To" bw "All The Time" on Kerr. Joseph Porter who produced Lynne Randell's single, "Wasn't It You" bw "Grey Day" for Silver Cloud would later produce her album on Amaret Records.

On February 24, 1969 she appeared at the Chateau Laurier.

=== 1970's onwards ===
In 1971, she was signed to Kenny Myers' label Amaret Records. She recorded her debut album, A Girl For All Reasons. The album which was produced by Joe Porter and engineered by Bill Schnee and Matt Hyde. In 1972, her single "What I Don't Know Won't Hurt Me" was released which was one of Billboard Magazine's recommendations. Her last single for Amaret was the country styled "Daisy a Day" written by Jud Strunk backed with "Let Your Conscience Be Your Guide" written by George Soule and Al Cedarholme. Jerry Styner produced both songs. Her version of the single came out after Jud Strunk's version even though there was a possible rumor that her single was withheld or delayed. In 1981 she appeared on Pop! Goes the Country with Mel Tillis and Corbin/Hanner. Around 1983 she played Miss Twiddle in the children's series Imagine That! Great Moments and People in History.

== Television ==
- The Rosey Grier Show - (1970)
- Hee Haw - Dian Hart sang "9 to 5" - Aired Sunday 9:00 PM Sep 19 on CBS - (1981)
- Pop! Goes the Country - (1981)

== Discography ==
=== Singles ===
Dian Erhardt

- "I'll Wait" / "Mama Worries" - RCA Victor 47-7136 - (1958)

Dian Hart

- "Used To" / " All The Time" - Kerr KRS-9006
- "To Love" / "It Only Hurts When They Laugh" - Amaret 45-128 - (1971)
- "Johnny One Time" / "If's A Mighty Big Word" - Amaret 45-135 - (1971)
- "What I Don't Know Won't Hurt Me" / "To Love" - Amaret AMT 142 - (1972)
- "Daisy a Day" / "Let Your Conscience Be Your Guide" - Amaret AMT 146 (1972)

=== Albums ===
- A Girl for All Reasons - Amaret ST 5010 - (1971)
