= Sean McCarthy Memorial Weekend =

Sean McCarthy Memorial Weekend is an annual Irish music and cultural festival held in Finuge, County Kerry, Ireland. Established in 1994 in memory of songwriter Sean McCarthy, the festival centres on original ballad writing, traditional music, storytelling and other aspects of Irish cultural life.

The festival is normally held over the August bank holiday weekend. Its principal event is the Sean McCarthy Ballad Competition, an original songwriting competition that has attracted entries from Ireland and abroad.

== History ==
McCarthy, who died in 1990, had lived in Finuge from 1964 and was known for songs including "Step It Out Mary", "Shanagolden", "Red Haired Mary" and "Mountain Tae". Following his death, a local committee was formed to commemorate his contribution to the musical and cultural life of North Kerry. The committee decided to erect a bust of McCarthy at Finuge Cross and establish an annual festival with a particular emphasis on original ballad composition and storytelling.

The first festival was held in 1994. Former politician and Finuge native Jimmy Deenihan became closely involved with the festival and has been described as one of its founders.

By 2001 the festival was in its ninth staging. That year's programme was opened by RTÉ broadcaster Donncha Ó Dúlaing and included appearances by songwriter Pete St. John and singer Danny Doyle, a friend of McCarthy who had recorded several of his songs.

The festival did not take place in 2005 following the withdrawal of sponsorship, the first cancellation in its first twelve years. It returned in 2006.

In 2015, marking the festival's 21st anniversary, organisers reported that more than 1,000 original ballads had been entered in the competition since its establishment. The festival also reintroduced a national storytelling competition named after McCarthy's brother, Mick McCarthy.

Following a three-year hiatus, the festival returned in 2022.

== Ballad competition ==
The Sean McCarthy Ballad Competition has been a central feature of the festival since 1994. Entrants submit original ballads, from which a judging panel selects finalists to perform their compositions at Teach Siamsa in Finuge.

The competition accepts compositions in Irish or English. Finalists perform their own entries, accompanied by no more than two musicians, and the songs must not previously have been performed or published.

In 2010 the competition received more than sixty new ballads from songwriters around Ireland, with fourteen selected for the final. The competition has received support from the Irish Music Rights Organisation (IMRO).

== Programme ==
Although ballad composition forms the core of the festival, its programmes have included concerts, traditional music, storytelling, dancing, songwriting workshops, art exhibitions, children's events, nature walks and rambling house gatherings.

Musicians and performers who have appeared at the festival include Liam Clancy, Jim McCann, Danny Doyle, Seán Keane, Brendan Grace and Francie Conway.Other editions have featured artists including Frankie Gavin and De Dannan, as well as singers, storytellers and traditional dancers.

The festival has also maintained a connection with the local landscape. Programmes have included guided walks on nearby bogland, including events led by wildlife filmmaker Éamon de Buitléar.

== Storytelling ==
Storytelling has formed part of the festival since its foundation. A national competition was revived in 2015 in memory of Mick McCarthy, Sean McCarthy's brother.

The competition, subsequently known as the Mick McCarthy Storytelling Competition, has continued alongside the ballad competition as one of the festival's principal events.

== Sean McCarthy Lifetime Achievement Award ==
The festival also presents the Sean McCarthy Lifetime Achievement Award for songwriting. Songwriter Mickey MacConnell, best known for "Only Our Rivers Run Free", was an early recipient.

In 2022 the award was presented to songwriter and novelist Brendan Graham, whose compositions include "You Raise Me Up" and "Isle of Hope, Isle of Tears". The presentation was made by festival founder Jimmy Deenihan.

== Community role ==
Proceeds from the festival have been used for projects in Finuge. Festival organisers have reported funding village landscaping, the erection of McCarthy's memorial bust and the acquisition and restoration of Sheehan's thatched cottage, which has been used for community and cultural activities.

== See also ==
- Sean McCarthy (songwriter)
- Step It Out Mary
- Irish folk music
- Listowel Writers' Week
