= Joe Porter (producer) =

- Genres: Soul
- Occupations: Record producer, songwriter
- Years active: 1960s-2000s
- Labels: Motown, Amaret, 20th Century

Joe Porter is an American record producer and songwriter. As a producer, he has produced Thelma Houston, Lynne Randell, Rare Earth, Bobby Darin, O.C. Smith and many others. Porter is also responsible for the orchestral disco version of "Bandstand Boogie" for the television show American Bandstand. He was married to percussionist Bobbye Hall.

== Career ==
In July 1971, Porter took legal action against the music group Free Movement for breach of contract. This resulted from the group's taking hold of the name which Porter alleged belonged to him and failing to fulfill a songwriting agreement for which he was to get a percentage of their self composed songs. The case was dismissed. He had produced their 1971 song "Ive Found Someone Of My Own".

Possibly due to competition with Soul Train, American Bandstand may have updated their version of "Bandstand Boogie" to a disco version. Joe Porter was responsible for the new disco version which played during the opening and closing credits of the show from 1974 to 1977.

=== Song writer ===
Along with James Quill Smith, he co-wrote "How Does It Feel" for Terry Fischer. Along with Ellen Weston and Lesley Gore, Gladys Knight & the Pips, he co-write "Give It To Me, Sweet Thing". He also had a hand in writing songs for Bobbye Hall. He produced and co-wrote most of the songs for Hall's album Body Language for Lovers.

=== Production ===
In 1970, Porter along with Jerry Styner produced Gil Bernal for Kenny Myers's Amaret Records label. For that label he also produced 2 singles and an album for Dian Hart as well as the High Voltage album for Nick Anthony. In 1972, he produced Thelma Houston's 1972 Motown album MoWest.

Production list - Singles (selective)

- Lynne Randell – "Wasn't It You" / "Grey Day" - Silvercloud Records – 105 - (1968)
- Dian Hart - "Johnny One Time" / "If's A Mighty Big Word" - Amaret 45-135 - (1971)
- Barbara McNair – "I Mean To Shine" / "I Mean To Shine" - Marina Records – MR-606 - (1972)
- Gladys Knight & the Pips – "Neither One of Us (Wants to Be the First to Say Goodbye) / "Can't Give It Up No More" - Soul – S35098F - (1973) (side 1 only)
- Gladys Knight & the Pips* – "Between Her Goodbye And My Hello" / "This Child Needs Its Father" - Soul – S 35111F - (1974) (side 1 only)
- The Miracles – "Where Are You Going To My Love" ' "Up Again" - Tamla Motown – TMG 940 - (1975) (only side 1)
- Diana Trask – "Let's Get Down To Business" / "But He Was Good For Me" - ABC Records – ABC 4139 - (1976)
- David Castle – "Ten To Eight" / "Finally" - Parachute Records – RR 501 - (1977)
- Becky Lopez – "Sad" / "Sad" (Spanish version) - Mercury – 6173 008 - (1978)
- O.C. Smith – "Living Without Your Love" / "Can't Be The One To Say It's Over" - Shadybrook Records – SB-1049 - (1979)
