= Sean McCarthy (songwriter) =

Sean McCarthy statue in Finuge, Ireland

Sean McCarthy (5 July 1923 – 1 November 1990) was an Irish songwriter, singer, poet, broadcaster and journalist from County Kerry. Associated with the Irish folk revival of the mid-20th century, he wrote songs including "Step It Out Mary", "Shanagolden", "Red Haired Mary", "Highland Paddy", "The Hills of Connemara" (also known as "Mountain Tae") and "In Shame Love, In Shame".

His songs were written in a style closely associated with the Irish ballad tradition. In 1989, the Folk Music Society of Ireland described him as the writer of "many popular and widely recorded songs in traditional idiom".

== Early life ==
McCarthy was born at Greenville, Listowel, County Kerry, on 5 July 1923, one of ten children. He attended Listowel Primary School, where one of his teachers was the writer Bryan MacMahon. As a young man McCarthy spent periods in England and the United States before returning to Kerry. In 1964 he acquired a house in Finuge, near Listowel, which subsequently became his permanent home.

== Songwriting career ==
McCarthy became associated with the Irish folk-music revival in Britain and Ireland during the 1950s and 1960s. His songs often adopted the language, melodies and narrative forms associated with older Irish songs, while dealing with subjects drawn from contemporary life, local history and stories encountered by McCarthy. One of his best-known compositions, Step It Out Mary, developed from a children's skipping rhyme that he heard in Kanturk, County Cork. McCarthy later recalled that he could find no additional verses to the rhyme and composed a narrative about Mary and a soldier while working on a building site in London. He subsequently performed the song at the Crubeen folk club in Clapham, where singer Danny Doyle encountered it. Doyle later recorded the song, releasing it as the title track of an EP in 1967.

Another of McCarthy's compositions, "Red Haired Mary", was inspired by a newspaper report concerning an altercation involving a red-haired woman. "Shanagolden" became another widely performed song, while "Murphy's Volunteers" drew upon the experiences of Irish labourers working in Britain.

McCarthy's 1973 collection The Songs of Sean McCarthy contained songs including "Shanagolden", "Murphy's Volunteers", "Where Wild Winds Blow", "Fagan's Wake" and others. The collection is held by the Irish Traditional Music Archive.

His later book, The Road to Song: Sean McCarthy, His Songs, Their Music and Story, was published by Cló Duanaire in Cork in 1983 and combined his songs with accounts of their origins.

== Broadcasting and writing ==
McCarthy also worked as a broadcaster and journalist. He contributed to RTÉ Radio 1 programmes including Sunday Miscellany and Thought for the Day, and was associated with The Rambling House during the early years of Radio Kerry.

He was involved with Listowel Writers' Week. In an RTÉ News report from 1986 he appeared at the festival discussing its role in encouraging aspiring writers. Poet Gabriel Fitzmaurice later recalled that the Writers' Week ballad competition had originated as McCarthy's idea.

During the late 1980s McCarthy also wrote a series of newspaper articles entitled McCarthy's Women for The Kerryman, profiling women and their place in Irish society.

== Recordings ==
McCarthy was also a performer of his own material. The Irish Traditional Music Archive holds his recording The Wandering Man: Irish Songs and Rhythms, issued by EMI Records Ireland. Its track listing includes "Red-haired Mary", "Mountain Tae", "Murphy's Volunteers", "Shanagolden" and "Fagan's Wake".

His compositions were also recorded by other Irish folk singers. Danny Doyle recorded several of McCarthy's songs, including Step It Out Mary.

== Death and legacy ==
McCarthy died on 1 November 1990.

Following his death, a committee in Finuge established a memorial to him. A bronze bust was erected at Finuge Cross and, from 1994, the village has hosted the annual Sean McCarthy Memorial Weekend, centred on music, storytelling and original ballad composition. The competition continues to be supported by the Irish Music Rights Organisation, which describes the festival as a celebration of Irish songwriting, storytelling and traditional music.

A play based on McCarthy's life and work, And All His Songs Were Sad, was written by Mattie Lennon and has been produced in Ireland and the United States.

== Selected works ==
=== Songs ===
- "Step It Out Mary"
- "Shanagolden"
- "Red Haired Mary"
- "Highland Paddy"
- "Mountain Tae" ("The Hills of Connemara")
- "Murphy's Volunteers"
- "In Shame Love, In Shame"
- "Where Wild Winds Blow"
- "My Kerry Hill"
- "Fagan's Wake"

=== Books ===
- The Songs of Sean McCarthy (Castle Printing, 1973)
- The Road to Song: Sean McCarthy, His Songs, Their Music and Story (Cló Duanaire, 1983)

=== Recordings ===
- The Wandering Man: Irish Songs and Rhythms (EMI Records Ireland)

== See also ==
- Irish folk music
- Listowel Writers' Week
- Irish ballad

== Discography ==
- The Wandering Man, EMI, ISRMCD 009, 2002
