= The Danny Thomas Show =

American sitcom (1953–1964)

- Also known as: Make Room for Daddy
- Genre: Sitcom
- Directed by: Sheldon Leonard; William Asher; Danny Thomas
- Starring: Danny Thomas; Jean Hagen; Marjorie Lord; Sherry Jackson; Rusty Hamer; Angela Cartwright
- Composers: Herbert W. Spencer; Earle Hagen (MSI)
- Country of origin: United States
- No. of seasons: 11
- No. of episodes: 343 (list of episodes)

Production
- Executive producer: Louis F. Edelman
- Producers: Sheldon Leonard; Charles Stewart
- Running time: 23–25 minutes
- Production companies: Marterto Enterprises; T&L Productions

Original release
- Network: ABC
- Release: September 29, 1953 – April 25, 1957
- Network: CBS
- Release: October 1, 1957 – April 27, 1964

Related
- Make Room for Granddaddy

The Danny Thomas Show (titled Make Room for Daddy for its first three seasons) is an American sitcom that ran from 1953 to 1957 on ABC and from 1957 to 1964 on CBS. Starring Danny Thomas as a successful nightclub entertainer, the show focused on his relationship with his family, yet went through a number of significant changes in cast and characters during the course of its run. Episodes regularly featured music by Thomas, guest stars and occasionally other cast members as part of the plot.

In March 1953, Thomas first signed the contract for the show with ABC and chose Desilu Studios to film it using its three-camera method. Two proposed titles during pre-production were The Children's Hour and Here Comes Daddy.

== Synopsis ==
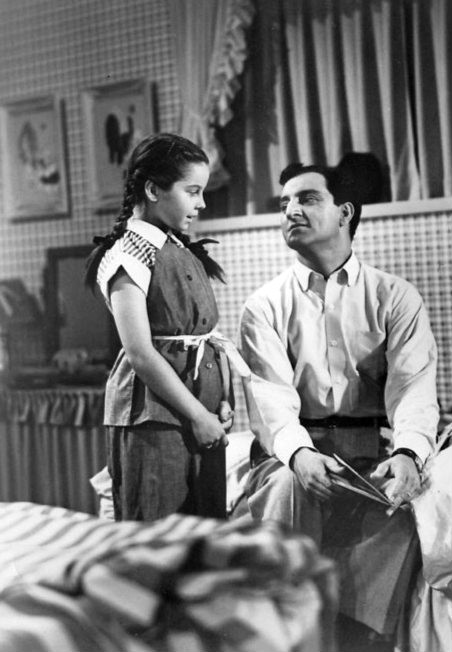
Thomas with television daughter Terry (Sherry Jackson)

Thomas played the role of Danny Williams, a successful comedian and nightclub entertainer at the Copa Club, based on the iconic New York City nightclub the Copacabana. In the show's first iteration as Make Room for Daddy, Jean Hagen played Thomas' serious and loving wife Margaret. Their daughter Terry was played by Sherry Jackson and their son Rusty by Rusty Hamer. The show's premise involved Danny rarely having time to spend with his family and Margaret having to deal with the children virtually on her own. She often felt neglected by Danny, and on several occasions felt like leaving him. Margaret was a society woman and strict with the children, but loved her family.

Louise Beavers made several appearances during this era as the Williams' maid, Louise Evans, and often was at odds with Danny and sided with Margaret in most of the couple's arguments. Nana Bryant often appeared as Margaret's kind mother Julia, of whom Danny and the children were fond, but Margaret, who had been raised by her aunt and uncle because of her mother often being away on stage tours, was not as warm to her mother. (Bryant died in late 1955, and rather than the character being recast, she simply disappeared. When Louise Beavers became ill in 1955, Amanda Randolph assumed the role of Louise.)

== Cast ==
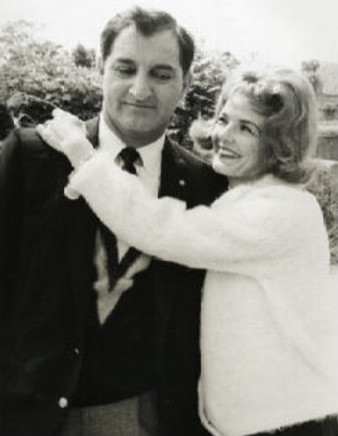
Danny Thomas and Marjorie Lord, 1962

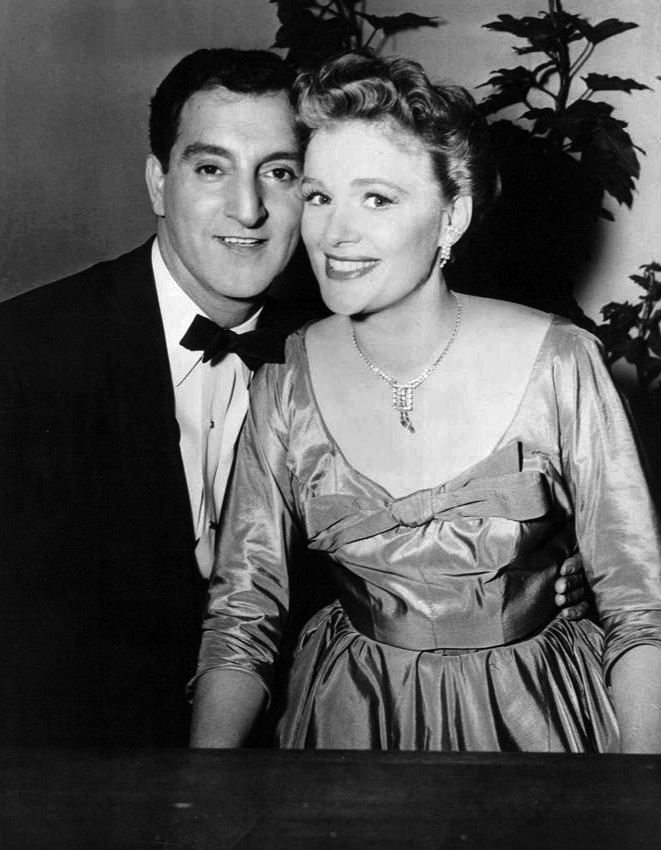
Danny and Margaret Williams (Jean Hagen)

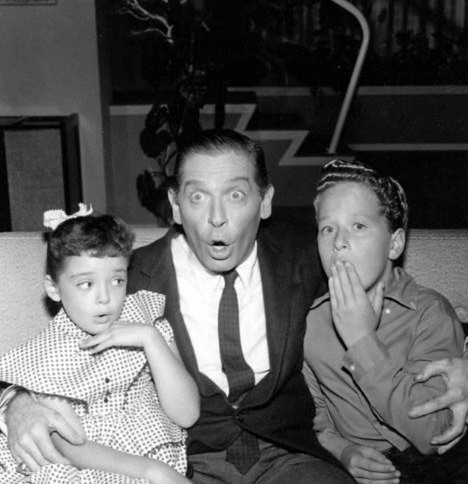
Milton Berle spends some time with Linda and Rusty after he and Danny quit show business.

- Danny Thomas as Danny Williams
- Jean Hagen as Margaret Williams (1953–1956)
- Marjorie Lord as Kathy "Clancey" O'Hara Williams (1957–1964)
- Rusty Hamer as Rusty Williams
- Angela Cartwright as Linda Williams (1957–1964)
- Sherry Jackson as Terry Williams (1953–1958)
- Penney Parker as Terry Williams (1959–1960)
- Louise Beavers as Louise (1953–1955)
- Amanda Randolph as Louise (1955–1964)

=== Supporting ===
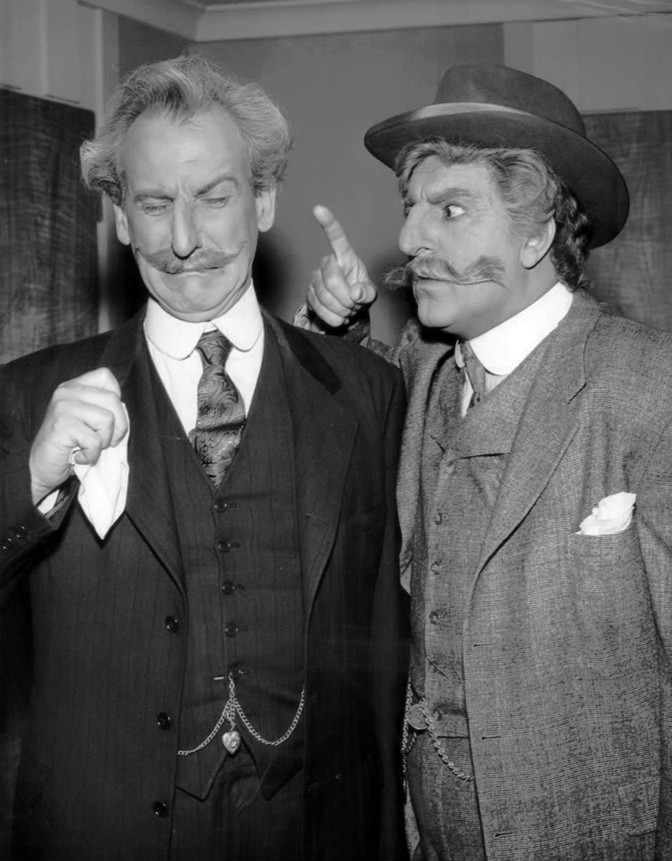
Uncle Tonoose (Hans Conried) and his older brother, Tufik (Danny Thomas).

The supporting cast included:

- Sid Melton as Charlie Halper
- Nana Bryant as Julia Summers (1953–1955)
- Pat Carroll as Bunny Halper (1961–1964)
- Sheldon Leonard as Phil Brokaw (1957–1961)
- Ben Lessy as Benny (1953–1959)
- Mary Wickes as Liz O'Neill (1955–1957)
- Pat Harrington Jr. as Pat Hannigan (1959–1960)
- Jesse White as Jesse Leeds (1953–1957)

=== Notable guest stars ===
Hans Conried had nineteen guest appearances as Danny's eccentric Lebanese "Uncle Tonoose". Other frequent guests included Bill Dana as José Jiménez, Annette Funicello as an Italian exchange student named Gina Manelli, and Thomas' protégée Italian teenaged singer Piccola Pupa. Other notable guest stars included band leader and musician Harry James, who appeared in the episode "The Trumpet Player", child pianist Ginny Tiu playing Li Chow in "The Chinese Doll" and Jimmy Durante, who appeared as himself in the episode "Danny and Durante". Lucille Ball and Desi Arnaz appeared in one episode together as their characters from I Love Lucy, and appearing as themselves in various episodes were Bob Hope, Jack Benny, Milton Berle, Max Baer, Sammy Davis Jr., Dinah Shore, and Dean Martin. Tony Bennett made his television acting debut in 1959 as Danny's singing cousin Stephen from Toledo, and Paul Anka played a young up-and-coming singer, as did Bobby Rydell. Zsa Zsa Gabor played a nightclub performer. Tennessee Ernie Ford portrayed a singer named Kentucky Cal. Brenda Lee plays Danny's maid, whom he hires as a singer. Danny Thomas's real-life daughter Marlo Thomas guest starred in the episode "Everything Happens to Me".

== Episodes ==
Season	Title	Episodes	Originally released			Rank	Rating
Season	Title	Episodes	First released	Last released	Network	Rank	Rating
1	Make Room for Daddy	30	September 29, 1953	April 20, 1954	ABC	—N/a	—N/a
2	Make Room for Daddy	30	September 28, 1954	April 26, 1955	ABC	—N/a	—N/a
3	Make Room for Daddy	30	September 13, 1955	April 17, 1956	ABC	—N/a	—N/a
4	The Danny Thomas Show	30	October 1, 1956	April 25, 1957	ABC	—N/a	—N/a
5	The Danny Thomas Show	32	October 7, 1957	May 26, 1958	CBS	2	35.3
6	The Danny Thomas Show	33	October 6, 1958	May 25, 1959	CBS	5	32.8
7	The Danny Thomas Show	33	October 5, 1959	May 23, 1960	CBS	4	31.1
8	The Danny Thomas Show	32	October 3, 1960	May 22, 1961	CBS	12	25.9
9	The Danny Thomas Show	31	October 2, 1961	May 7, 1962	CBS	8	26.1
10	The Danny Thomas Show	32	October 1, 1962	May 6, 1963	CBS	7	28.7 (Note: Tied with Ben Casey)
11	The Danny Thomas Show	30	September 30, 1963	April 27, 1964	CBS	9	26.7

== Background and production ==
For its first three years the show was titled Make Room for Daddy (retitled The Danny Thomas Show starting with season four) and garnered decent ratings, but failed to make the list of the top 30 programs. Shortly after the third season finished filming, Jean Hagen left the show over dissatisfaction with her role and frequent clashes with Danny Thomas. Thomas was upset with her for leaving, and felt the show would not last without her. However, he decided to push on. At the start of the fourth season, both Thomas and producer Sheldon Leonard were faced with a serious dilemma—how to explain Hagen's absence. To have "Danny" and "Margaret" divorce in that era would have been unacceptable to television audiences, so it was explained that Margaret had died suddenly off-screen. It was a risky move because until this time, no character on a TV situation comedy had died.

Danny was now a widower juggling a performing career while raising two children on his own. With the absence of Jean Hagen, character actress-comedienne Mary Wickes (who had worked with Thomas and singer-actress Doris Day in the 1952 Warner Bros. musical film I'll See You in My Dreams) was cast in the recurring role of Liz O'Neill, Danny Williams's no-nonsense press agent. Wickes remained with the show until 1958. During the show's fourth season, it was Liz, along with Louise and Danny's friends, who often looked after the children while he was touring. He decided to move them to a boarding school, but later relented and the family moved into a new apartment. Also in that year, Danny dated a few other women and nearly got engaged to a widowed singer until he found out she did not like children. By season's end, the ratings had suffered and it was decided that a wife and mother was needed to complete the family unit.

In a four-part story arc that began airing in April 1957, son Rusty fell ill with the measles and Danny hired Kathy O'Hara (Marjorie Lord), a young Irish nurse, to look after him. Kathy was a widow with a little girl (played by Leilani Sorenson). Danny and Kathy became fast friends and, not surprisingly, Danny quickly fell in love with her, as did the kids. In the season finale, the two became engaged. In a curious twist, ABC at this point canceled the series. In the spring of 1957, I Love Lucy, which had reigned as the top-rated show for almost all of its six-year run on CBS, was ending production. When CBS heard that ABC was cancelling the series, CBS picked it up as part of its 1957-58 schedule.

The Danny Thomas Show made its CBS debut on Monday, October 7, 1957, at 9:00 inheriting the time slot vacated by I Love Lucy. The fifth-season premiere episode, "Lose Me In Las Vegas", had Danny and Kathy already married and on their honeymoon. The Williams family moved into a larger brand-new apartment and, with the change of network, the producers also changed Kathy's daughter. Leilani Sorenson was dropped from the cast and replaced by Angela Cartwright as Linda. Linda then was adopted by Danny, and the show's ratings dramatically increased. At the end of its fifth season, The Danny Thomas Show posted its highest rating, ranking at No. 2. During this season, Amanda Randolph was sick and rarely appeared as Louise, who was said to be recovering from the flu, with Kathy doing most of the housework.

In the early part of the sixth season, Sherry Jackson left the show and the character of Terry was said to have gone to a girls school in Paris. Jackson commented on her close friendship with Jean Hagen and why she left the series:

The major perk was Jean Hagen. I adored her. We had a great time. She and I were best buddies; she was my only friend from the Make Room for Daddy cast. What made me specifically want to leave the show? I had a five-year contract, Jean had a three-year contract. Jean was thoroughly fed up with the series and made it clear that she didn't want to come back. When she left, I was devastated. I didn't want to continue, either. I wanted to break my contract. They wouldn't let me leave, but gave me less to do; that's why I'm in fewer shows from ages 14–16.

In Season 7, the character of Terry was brought back, but recast with Penney Parker. Terry was featured in a seven-episode story arc that had her engaged and eventually married to Pat Hannigan (Pat Harrington, Jr.), a nightclub friend of Danny's. After the wedding, the Hannigans moved to California and Terry was rarely mentioned, never to be seen on the show again.

In the last two seasons, with Thomas and Lord tired of their roles, Danny and Kathy both regularly traveled, and for much of the tenth season they toured Europe (with a handful of episodes featuring location footage). Rusty and Linda were looked after by Danny's manager, Charlie Halper (Sid Melton) and his wife Bunny (Pat Carroll). During the 11th and final season, Thomas decided to retire from the show and the program ended in the spring of 1964, finishing as still one of the most popular television programs and ranking at number nine.

=== Music ===
The theme music, which went through various arrangements over the course of the show, was based on the traditional Irish song "Danny Boy".

== Broadcast ==
=== Syndication ===
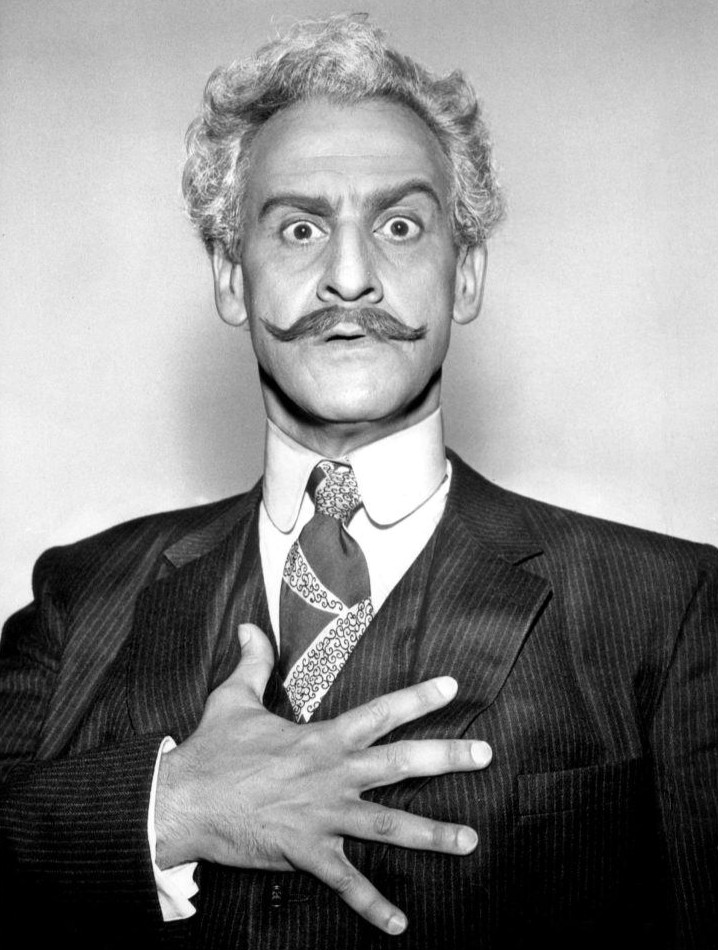
Hans Conried as Uncle Tonoose, 1959

Reruns of the show (using the original title, "Make Room for Daddy") were aired weekdays on NBC from October 4, 1960, to March 26, 1965. The episodes shown were from season one through season nine. CBS aired primetime repeats April 19 through September 6, 1965, on Monday nights at 9:30 p.m (Eastern time). Subsequently, most of the CBS episodes were then syndicated in the fall of 1967 and offered to local stations. The first four seasons from ABC were not put into syndication.

From February 1, 1987, to 1991, the show's fifth through ninth seasons were shown on Nick at Nite. TV Land and GoodLife Television aired the majority of the episodes from the fourth season through the seventh season (and select episodes from seasons eight and nine).

The show aired on Lifestyle until the channel ceased operations in 1993.

MeTV aired the show from Labor Day of 2012 to December 31, 2014.

In 2014, the series joined the weekday line up of Cozi TV, until its removal in 2021. They broadcast all the 1956–1964 episodes which includes the 4th season, the first season after Jean Hagen left the show (1956–1957). Cozi also added the final two seasons of the show (Seasons 10 and 11) that had not been shown in any package of reruns since 1965.

Episodes of the show can be seen on TVS Nostalgia Network.Com. Season 5 (only) is available on Hulu. Amazon Prime and FilmRise are streaming the show currently as of April 2024. The Catchy Comedy network currently airs one episode every weekday at 9am ET as of November 2024.

George Carlin referred to the reruns as "Daddy has had room made for".

=== Home media ===
On September 28, 2004, Questar released the complete fifth season on Region 1 DVD. The set includes two special episodes: the fourth-season finale, "Danny's Proposal", and the pilot for The Andy Griffith Show.

The complete sixth season on DVD was released on January 22. 2008. It was released by a different company than the one that had handled the fifth-season package, and contained uncut episodes with vintage second-run opening titles from the early 1960s NBC network daytime reruns.

Season four was released on DVD in 2020.

Several of the early episodes with Jean Hagen can be purchased on discount DVDs, as these episodes have entered public domain because of lapsed copyright.

== Media information ==
=== Spinoffs and crossovers ===
The series played a role in the creation of another long-running sitcom, The Andy Griffith Show. In the seventh season, Danny Thomas is arrested by Sheriff Andy Taylor (Andy Griffith) and detained in the small town of Mayberry in an episode titled "Danny Meets Andy Griffith". The episode aired on February 15, 1960, and The Andy Griffith Show premiered later that year on October 3.

The Joey Bishop Show originated as a back-door pilot aired as an episode of The Danny Thomas Show titled "Everything Happens to Me", aired on March 27, 1961. Though Bishop's show went through a series of changes, the characters of Danny and Rusty appeared in several Joey Bishop Show episodes over its four-year run, with Rusty appearing on the show for a three-episode arc in early 1965, about a year after The Danny Thomas Show itself had wound down. Kathy and Charlie Halper also appeared in one episode of The Joey Bishop Show.

The series also crossed over to The Lucy–Desi Comedy Hour In the 1958 Lucy–Desi episode "Lucy Makes Room for Danny", the Williams (Danny Thomas, Marjorie Lord, Rusty Hamer and Angela Cartwright) rent Lucy and Ricky Ricardo's house. Lucille Ball and Desi Arnaz subsequently appeared as the Ricardos on an episode of The Danny Thomas Show ("Lucy Upsets the Williams Household") which aired on January 5, 1959.

Morey Amsterdam guest-starred as Buddy Sorrell of The Dick Van Dyke Show in the episode "The Woman Behind the Jokes", season 11, episode 4.

Eight episodes of The Danny Thomas Show (in seasons 8–10) featured Bill Dana as José Jiménez. This led to the spin-off series The Bill Dana Show, starring Dana as Jiménez. Danny Thomas played himself in one episode of The Bill Dana Show.

=== Sequel ===
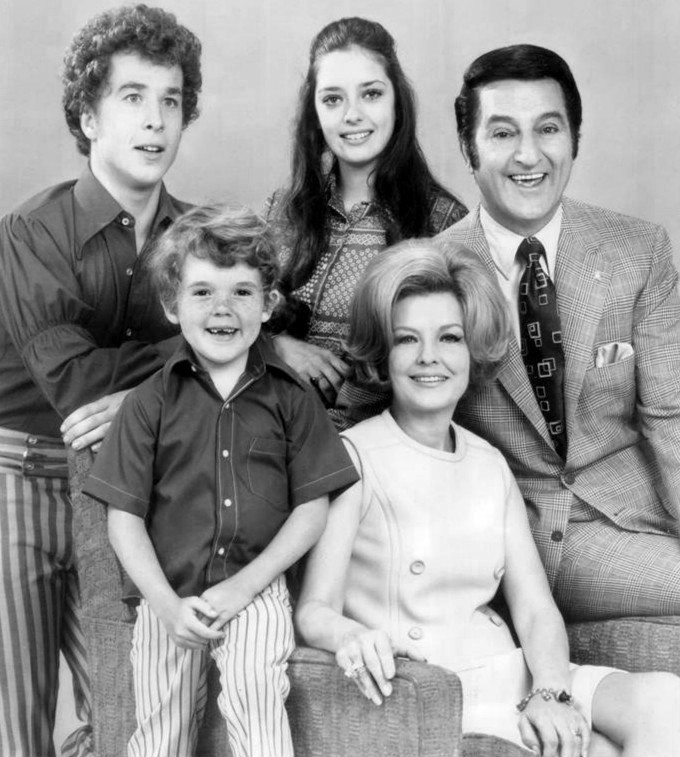
The cast for Make Room for Granddaddy

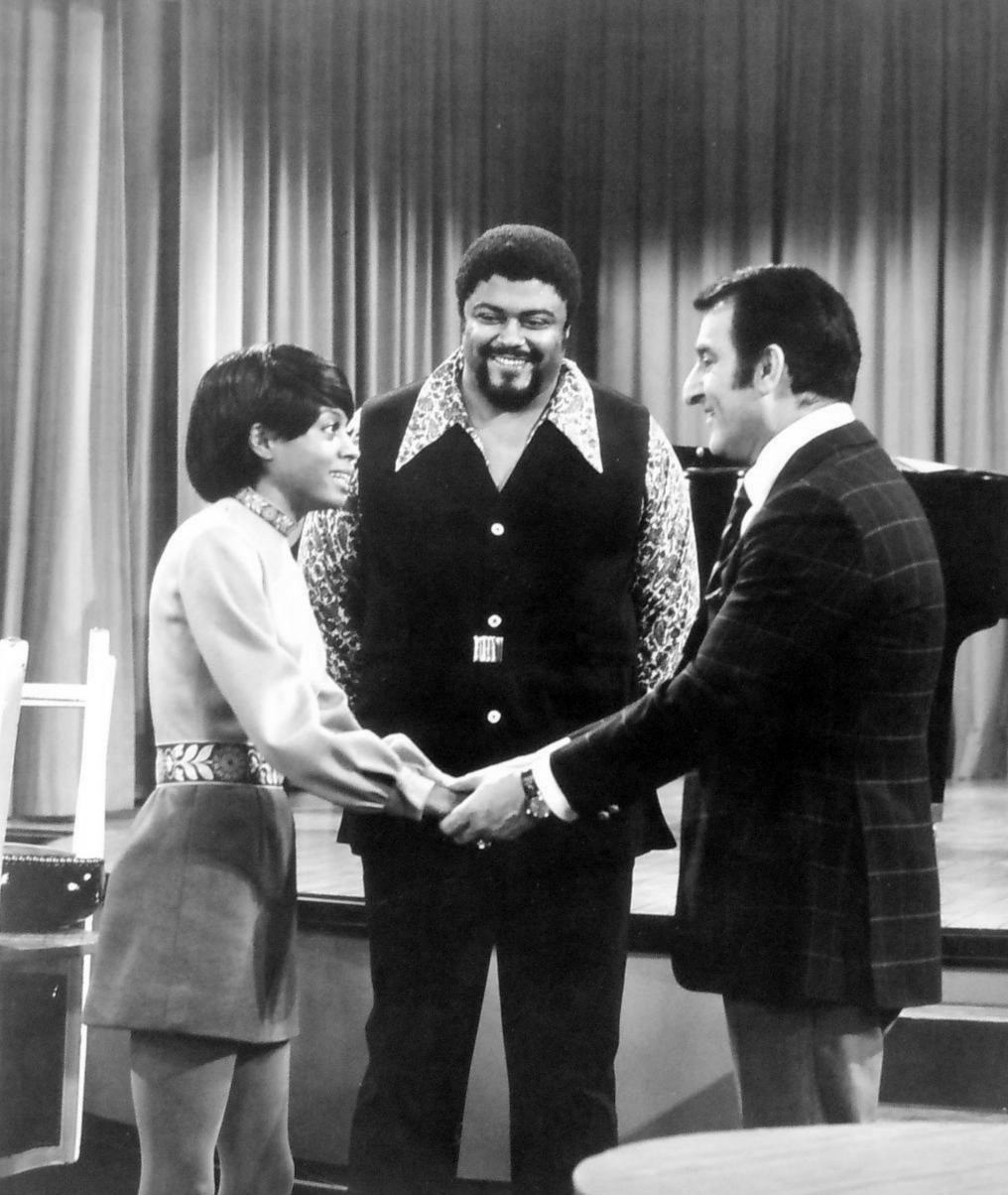
Guest star Diana Ross with Rosey Grier and Thomas in 1971

The show ended in 1964, but Danny Thomas, Marjorie Lord, Angela Cartwright, Rusty Hamer, Sherry Jackson, Amanda Randolph and Hans Conried returned in 1965 for a two-hour-long "reunion" special on NBC, The Danny Thomas TV Family Reunion, considered the first TV reunion show, and Make More Room for Daddy, which aired as an episode of The Danny Thomas Hour in November 1967. Shortly after filming the second special in 1967, Randolph died suddenly of a stroke at the age of 70. A CBS reunion special, Make Room for Granddaddy, was aired in 1969. The special did so well that it was picked up as a series by CBS, but Thomas considered its assigned time slot to be too quiet and pulled the show.

ABC brought it back on a weekly basis in 1970, in Make Room for Granddaddy. For the series premiere, Sherry Jackson reprised her role of oldest daughter Terry. No mention was made of her husband Pat Hannigan. Instead, for this new version of the series, Terry's husband was named Bill, who was a soldier. In this episode, Terry left her son, six-year-old Michael (played by Michael Hughes), in the care of grandparents Danny and Kathy so she could join Bill, who was stationed overseas. In addition to Lord, Hamer and Cartwright, the only other returning regulars were Sid Melton as Charley Halper and Hans Conried as Uncle Tonoose. During that season, new characters were played by Stanley Myron Handelman and former football player Roosevelt Grier. Pat Carroll did not reprise her role of Bunny Halper. The show lasted only one year, producing 24 episodes; its cancellation came at a time when the networks were purging content favoring older, rural and other less affluent viewers after the loss of a half-hour of daily program time in 1971. According to Lord, the series faced many obstacles, including the unprofessionalism and inexperience of the child actor Michael Hughes, the absence of Sheldon Leonard as producer/director to control Thomas and improve the quality of the scripts, and the fact that ABC switched the time slot of the show from Wednesday nights at 8:00 pm to Thursday nights at 9:00 pm. As a result, the ratings went from mediocre to poor.
