= Ginny Tiu =

American philanthropist and former child piano prodigy

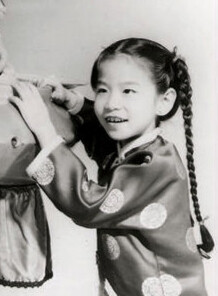
- Tiu in a 1962 publicity photo

Background information
- Born: 1954
- Genres: Pop, sunshine pop
- Occupation(s): Singer, entertainer
- Instrument(s): Piano, vocals
- Labels: Amaret

Virginia "Ginny" Tiu (born 1954) is an American philanthropist and former child piano prodigy. In the late 1960s, she headed Ginny Tiu and the Few, a pop and sunshine pop group.

== Background ==
Tiu began playing the piano when she was three, with her father as her first teacher.

== Career ==
=== 1950s - 1970s ===
On May 3, 1959, Tiu appeared on The Ed Sullivan Show for the first time; she continued to appear on the show several times throughout 1960.

Tiu appeared as Chow-Lee on The Danny Thomas Show (American TV series) in the episode "The China Doll," which aired on October 19, 1959.

In 1962, she performed in front of John F. Kennedy. She also appeared in the film Girls! Girls! Girls! as Mai Ling, performing "Earth Boy" with Elvis Presley and her sister Elizabeth.

In 1968, she appeared on The Jonathan Winters Show with her family.

==== "Let Me Get Through to You Baby" ====
It was noted in the 9 November 1968 issue of Cash Box that Amaret Records, had purchased a master from Bill Traut of Dunwich Productions. Traut was the producer for the group, The American Breed. The purchased master recording featured Ginny Tiu. It was to be the first release for the label. Her single, "Let Me Get Through to You Baby" bw "I've Got to Get You Off My Mind" was released on Amaret 100. A Cash Box Best Bet single, the reviewer said that new label Amaret had a promising start with the debut single and the teen liveliness could bring in the exposure.

"Let Me Get Through to You" made its debut at no. 49 in the Cash Box Looking Ahead chart for the week of 14 December 1968. The song peaked at no. 36 for the week of 21 December. The song's chart presence would continue into the new year with its last position of 41 for the week of 4 January 1969.

A deal would be struck in 1969 between Kenny Myers of Amaret and Neville Smith for Astor Records. This was for Ginny Tiu's single and then subsequent releases by the Raintree Minority, and Mrs. Miller.

==== Further activities ====
It was reported in the 28 December 1968 issue of Cash Box that Ginny Tiu & the Few had returned to the West Coast for guest appearances on several television shows.

For the week of 25 October 1969, Cash Box reported that Ginny Tiu and her revue would be touring in the fall. They would be covering 108 major cities across the United States and Canada. Some of the venues included, Madison Square Garden in New York, Maple Leaf Garden in Toronto and the Cow Palace in San Francisco.

Two other singles by Ginny Tiu and the Few were released in 1969. They were, "I've Got to Make Up with You" bw "Billy Sunshine" on Amaret 45-104, and "Rain, Rain, Rain, Rain" bw "Strangers Tonight" on Amaret 45-109.

=== 1970s to 1990s ===
Tiu embarked on a nine-month tour with the Harlem Globetrotters. The tour included America, Canada and Europe. She was the half-time star of their show. It was reported in the 5 September 1970 issue of Cash Box that she had returned from the tour.

In 1971, Tiu was heading to Hong Kong to appear on Hong Kong television. It was her second special for Television Broadcasting Limited. It was also mentioned in the 8 May issue of Cash Box that she was to cut an album for Polydor.

=== 2000s ===
In 2014, Tiu received the Monsignor Charles A. Kekumano Noblesse Oblige Service Award from the Maryknoll School. In 2018, she was awarded Philanthropist of the Year by the Association of Fundraising Professionals.

In June 2021, Tiu joined the Animal Legal Defense Fund board. In August, she joined the University of Hawaii Foundation board of trustees. As of May 2022, she serves on the board of the Hawaii Symphony Orchestra, the University of Hawaii Foundation Board of Trustees and the Animal Legal Defense Fund.

== Personal life ==
Tiu was born in the Philippines, the middle child of nine siblings including Vicky Cayetano. Tiu lived in Southern California, Chicago and San Francisco before moving to Hawaii in 1987.
