= Evil Woman (Crow song) =

1969 single by Crow

- Side A of the 1969 Canadian single

Single by Crow

from the album Crow Music
- B-side: "Gonna Leave a Mark"
- Released: August 1969
- Genre: Hard rock
- Length: 3:03
- Label: Amaret
- Songwriters: Dave Wagner; Dick Wiegand; Larry Wiegand
- Producer: Bob Monaco

Crow singles chronology
"Time to Make a Turn" (1969)	"Evil Woman" (1969)	"Cottage Cheese" (1970)

"Evil Woman", sometimes titled "Evil Woman (Don't Play Your Games with Me)" or "Evil Man", is a song by Minneapolis–St. Paul–based band Crow, released as a single from their 1969 album Crow Music. It reached number 19 on the US Billboard Hot 100 pop chart, number 65 in Australia, and its highest position at number 15 in Canada.

== Chart performance ==
Chart (1969–1970)	Peak position
Australia (Kent Music Report)	65
Canada (RPM)	15
US Billboard Hot 100	17

== Black Sabbath version ==
"Evil Woman"

Single by Black Sabbath

from the album Black Sabbath
- B-side: "Wicked World"
- Released: January 2, 1970
- Recorded: November 10, 1969
- Studio: Trident Studios (London)
- Genre: Heavy metal
- Length: 3:25
- Label: Fontana/Vertigo
- Songwriters: Dave Wagner; Dick Wiegand; Larry Wiegand
- Producer: Rodger Bain

Black Sabbath singles chronology
"Evil Woman" (1970)	"The Wizard" (1970)

Covered in 1969 by Black Sabbath and released in England as the band's first single on January 2, 1970, the song also appeared on the original version of the band's self-titled debut album, although it was replaced by its B-side, "Wicked World", on the later, American versions of the album. When the band's debut album started to become successful in the UK, the single was re-released on March 26, 1970.

It was not officially released in North America until 2002, when it was included on the compilation album Symptom of the Universe: The Original Black Sabbath 1970–1978. It was later included on another compilation album, Black Sabbath: The Ultimate Collection, released in 2016.
