= Sam Honigberg =

- Born: Sam Honigberg; December 22, 1911; Vovkovyntsi, Russian Empire
- Died: May 17, 2007 (aged 95); Los Angeles, California
- Occupations: Media correspondent, publicist

Sam Honigberg (1911-2007) was once an associate editor of Billboard Magazine and then later head of a department for Frederick Brothers Artists Corp. He was also a publicist who represented acts such as George Gobel, Bob Newhart, Steve Allen and the Leave It to Beaver series.

== Personal background ==
Honigberg was born in the Russian Empire. In 1926, he and his family he emigrated to the United States where they settled in Pittsburgh. He later attended the Pittsburgh University. One of his classmates was Gene Kelly.

He was a longtime friend of entertainer George Gobel who had also worked for as his publicity man. For a period of time, the Honigbergs lived in Sherman Oaks, Los Angeles.

His wife Anne died at age 85 on July 1, 1999, of natural causes at Encino Hospital. He died of natural causes on 17 May 2007 at age 95.

== Career ==
He started working as a Pittsburgh-based correspondent for The Billboard in the early 1930s. He spent ten years with the magazine, where he worked at both the New York City and Chicago offices. In his final year there he worked on the magazine's night club, cocktail and vaudeville departments. In 1943, he left to take up a position at Frederick Brothers Artists Corp in the act dept, replacing a role vacated by Freddy Williamson. In 1950, he had Kenny Myers working for him at his Chicago office handling DJ promotion.

He worked as a unit publicist for RKO, Paramount and Universal. He also worked for Rogers & Cowan for a few years.
