= Glenn Jenks =

American composer (1947–2016)

- Born: Glenn Arnold Jenks; February 9, 1947; Boston, Massachusetts, U.S.
- Died: January 21, 2016 (aged 68) Portland, Maine, U.S.
- Genres: Ragtime
- Occupations: Musician, composer
- Instrument: Piano
- Years active: 1975-2016
- Labels: Fretless, Stomp Off, Viridiana, Bonnie Brae

Glenn Jenks (February 9, 1947 – January 21, 2016) was an American ragtime pianist, composer and music historian.

== Career and life ==
Jenks was a "prolific ragtime composer, teacher and performer from Maine who fused traditional ragtime with classical music themes". He attended the New England Conservatory before going on to receive a degree in music from Earlham College, graduating Phi Beta Kappa. Jenks toured with singer-songwriter Jud Strunk between 1975 and 1978. He also performed with such acts as Manhattan Transfer, Dick Hyman, Gordon Bok, Doc Watson and Andy Williams. In 1978, Jenks began his solo performing career and in 1979 released his first album entitled Antidote on the Bonnie Banks record label.

Throughout the 1980s, Jenks served as pianist for the New England Vaudeville Review, the New Vaudeville Revival, and husband and wife dance duo Tony and Karen Montanaro. Jenks was an original founding member of numerous ragtime festivals and between 1989 and 2000 he produced the Harvest Ragtime Revue in Camden, Maine. Jenks was a noted ornithologist and botany specialist on roses who conducted tours of gardens throughout the Camden area. He founded the annual Rose Day celebration at the Merryspring Nature Center.

“As a performer, Jenks was known for his energetic playing, focusing mostly on traditional ragtime idioms. As a composer, he wrote wonderfully sensitive rags, sticking close to the traditional ragtime form, but blending in sophisticated contemporary harmonies. He wrote over 30 piano rags, a string quartet, a ragtime piano concerto and many non-ragtime compositions as well.”

— Corte Swearingen

Jenks was commissioned by Down East Singers to compose Heaven and Earth are Full of Thy Glory for their concert tour of Russia. His String Quartet in Ragtime has been recorded and performed by several string quartets including the Laurentian Quartet, Vancadium Quartet and the Halcyon Quartet.

Jenks died on January 21, 2016, in Portland, Maine.

== Legacy ==
In 2019, the Glenn Jenks Ragtime Revue premiered at the Camden Opera House in Camden, Maine. The Revue revived a tradition that Jenks started 30 years prior which brought nationally-known artists together in "song, dance, humor and ragtime." The Revue has presented awards to various ragtime performers including Sue Keller, Edward A. Berlin and Max Morath. It also sponsors the "Glenn Jenks Future in Music Prize" in association with the Bay Chamber Concerts and Music School in Rockport, Maine.

In 2020, a collection of Jenk’s complete rags for piano was released. In May 2024, American pianist Corte Swearingen released the album The Complete Ragtime Works for Piano by Glenn Jenks - Vol. 1. The Scott Joplin International Ragtime Festival in Sedalia, Missouri posthumously awarded Jenks their 2024 Lifetime Achievement Award.

== Discography ==
Year	Album title	Performers	Record label	Catalog number
1979	Antidote	Glenn Jenks	Bonnie Banks Records	BB 101
1981	Background Music	Glenn Jenks, Various	Philo Records	FR-157
1983	The Ragtime Project	Glenn Jenks	Bonnie Banks Records	BB 103
1985	The Ragtime Project - Volume Two	Glenn Jenks	Bonnie Banks Records	BB 104
1988	Ragtime Alchemy	Glenn Jenks	Stomp Off	SOS1179
1991	American Beauties	Glenn Jenks	Bonnie Banks Production	BB 106CD
1994	Easy Winners	Glenn Jenks	Bonnie Banks Production	BB 108CD
1995	Ragtime Bigtime	Glenn Jenks, Dan Grinstead	Stomp Off Records	Stomp Off CD 1292
1999	Invitation to the Danza	Glenn Jenks	Viridiana Productions	VRD 2011
1999	Ragtime Sweets	Glenn Jenks, Susan Boyce	Smart Set Sound	SSS-002
2007	Spider In the Tub	Glenn Jenks	Bonnie Banks Production	BB 109CD

== Music publications ==
- Jenks, Glenn (1993). A Garden of Ragtime, Squanlake Music. 68 pages.
- Jenks, Glenn (2020). The Complete Ragtime Works For Piano by Glenn Jenks. 265 pages.
