= Listowel Writers' Week =

Listowel Writers' Week is an annual literary festival held in Listowel, County Kerry, Ireland. Founded in 1970, with its first festival taking place in 1971, it is Ireland's longest-running literary festival. The festival brings together Irish and international writers for readings, interviews, workshops, discussions, literary competitions, theatre and other cultural events.

The festival grew out of the literary traditions of north Kerry and has been associated with writers including John B. Keane, Bryan MacMahon, Brendan Kennelly and Gabriel Fitzmaurice. It is also the venue for literary awards including the Kerry Group Irish Novel of the Year Award and the Pigott Poetry Prize.

== History ==
The idea for Writers' Week emerged in Listowel in 1970. Poet Gabriel Fitzmaurice, who later chaired the festival, has written that the festival was conceived during a chance meeting between playwright John B. Keane, writer and teacher Bryan MacMahon, writer Tim Danaher and teacher Nóra Relihan. Their intention was to celebrate the unusually strong literary tradition of Listowel and north Kerry and to create opportunities for aspiring writers.

The first Writers' Week took place in 1971. Academic Séamus Wilmot served as its first president. Contemporary RTÉ coverage of the following festival featured Keane, MacMahon and poet Brendan Kennelly discussing Listowel's literary traditions and the value of creating a festival around writers and their work.

The inaugural programme was modest. According to a retrospective in The Irish Times, the 1971 programme was two pages long and included new work by Keane and MacMahon, writers' workshops, talks, an arts and crafts exhibition and tours of locations associated with local writers.

== Development ==
A central aim of Writers' Week became the encouragement of new writers through workshops and contact with established authors. By 1986, RTÉ described the festival as a meeting place for both practising and aspiring writers, with workshops in poetry, short-story writing and drama. Tutors included John Montague, Benedict Kiely and Brendan Kennelly.

The festival also developed a substantial programme of literary competitions, book launches and publishing events. An RTÉ report on the eighth festival in 1978 recorded approximately 2,000 visitors, 1,300 entries to literary competitions, seven book launches and the participation of forty publishers.

By its 40th anniversary in 2011, the festival programme included readings by Irish and international writers, workshops, theatre and film events, exhibitions, book launches and literary tours. Participants that year included Kevin Barry, Michael Holroyd, David Sedaris, Alice Sebold, Jackie Kay, Joseph O'Connor, John Connolly and Robert McCrum.

That year's events also included workshops led by figures such as playwright Marina Carr, poet Harry Clifton and screenwriter Mark O'Halloran.

== Literary awards ==
Writers' Week hosts a number of literary competitions and awards.

=== Kerry Group Irish Novel of the Year Award ===
The Kerry Group Irish Novel of the Year Award is presented annually at the festival. Established in the 1990s and sponsored by Kerry Group, it recognises a novel by an Irish author.

Previous recipients include John Banville, Anne Enright, Colm Tóibín, Sebastian Barry, Claire Keegan and Niall Williams.

=== Pigott Poetry Prize ===
The Pigott Poetry Prize is awarded for a collection by an Irish poet. Established in 2014 and sponsored by Mark Pigott and his family, it has become one of Ireland's largest monetary awards for a poetry collection.

By 2026 the winner's award had increased to €20,000, with €2,000 awarded to each of the other shortlisted poets.

=== Other competitions ===
The festival has also administered awards for short stories, individual poems, poetry collections, Irish-language writing and local history. The Bryan MacMahon Short Story Award is named for one of the festival's founders.

== Relationship with Listowel ==
The festival has traditionally operated throughout the town rather than from a single venue. Events have taken place in theatres, hotels, schools, pubs and temporary venues, helping create an informal relationship between visiting writers and audiences.

The festival's connection to the town's literary community has been a recurring feature of accounts of Writers' Week. In 1986, Fitzmaurice compared it to a community united by the common purpose of creating writing, while songwriter Sean McCarthy said the festival offered aspiring writers encouragement he had lacked when beginning his career in the 1950s.

== Governance changes and 2022–2023 dispute ==
For most of its history, the literary programme was developed by a large voluntary committee. In 2022, following an independent review commissioned amid concerns about governance and artistic programming, the festival's board decided to replace the committee-based programming structure with a professional curator.

The decision caused a significant dispute between the board and members of the long-standing volunteer committee. Writer Colm Tóibín, who had served as festival president, stepped aside in November 2022 in opposition to the decision to disband the committee.

The board said the restructuring was intended to address weaknesses identified in governance, artistic direction and professional management. Critics argued that it diminished the role of the local volunteer community that had shaped the festival for decades.

In December 2022, Belfast poet and literary organiser Stephen Connolly was appointed the first professional curator in the festival's 52-year history, responsible for programming the 2023 event.

The dispute continued into 2023, when members of the former committee announced that they would not participate in that year's festival. Former chairman Gabriel Fitzmaurice criticised the handling of the restructuring, while board representatives maintained that changes were necessary to meet governance and funding obligations.

== Later years ==
The festival continued after the restructuring. Its 55th edition was held from 27 to 31 May 2026.

The 2026 programme included literary interviews, poetry, fiction, theatre, music, workshops and children's events, while the festival continued to host the Kerry Group Irish Novel of the Year and Pigott Poetry Prize.

== See also ==
- Listowel
- John B. Keane
- Bryan MacMahon (writer)
- Gabriel Fitzmaurice
- Sean McCarthy (songwriter)
- Kerry Group Irish Novel of the Year Award
- Irish literature
