= Daisy a Day =

Single by Jud Strunk

from the album Daisy a Day
- B-side: "The Searchers"
- Released: November 1972
- Genre: Country
- Length: 2:48
- Label: MGM
- Songwriter: Jud Strunk
- Producers: Mike Curb, Don Costa

Jud Strunk singles chronology
"Bill Jones General Store" (1971)	"Daisy a Day" (1972)	"Next Door Neighbor's Kid" (1973)

"Daisy a Day" is a song written and performed by Jud Strunk. It was produced by Mike Curb and Don Costa and Costa also was the arranger.

It reached No.4 on the U.S. adult contemporary chart, No.14 on the Billboard pop chart, and No.33 on the U.S. country chart in 1973. In Canada, it reached No.3 on the pop chart, No.5 on the adult contemporary chart, and No.18 on the country chart. In Australia it reached No.1. The song was featured on Strunk's 1973 album, Daisy a Day. The single ranked No.89 on Billboard's Year-End Hot 100 singles of 1973.

== Background ==
During the song, the singer tells a story about the relationship between a boy and girl as they grow up and ultimately grow old together. For every single day of their joined lives, he gives her a daisy as a sign of their love. In the last verse, she has died but her widower husband continues to make daily visits to her grave … and he still gives her a daisy a day.

== Chart performance ==
=== Weekly charts ===
Chart (1973)	Peak position
Australia (Kent Music Report)	1
Canada RPM Top Singles	3
Canada RPM Adult Contemporary	5
Canada RPM Country	18
New Zealand (Listener)	4
US Adult Contemporary (Billboard)	4
US Billboard Hot 100	14
US Hot Country Songs (Billboard)	33
US Cash Box Top 100	10

Danny Doyle version

Chart (1973)	Peak position
Ireland (IRMA)	1

=== Year-end charts ===
Chart (1973)	Rank
Australia	10
Canada RPM Top Singles	101
US Billboard Hot 100	89
US Adult Contemporary (Billboard)	

== Other versions ==
- Dian Hart, as a single in 1972.
- Danny Doyle, as a single in 1973; it reached No.1 in Ireland.
- The Settlers, as a single in the United Kingdom in 1973.
- Roy Clark, on his 1973 album, Come Live with Me.
- Ernest Tubb, on his 1973 album, I've Got All the Heartaches I Can Handle.
- Hank Snow released it on his LP of the same name in 1974.
- Kamahl, as the B-side to his 1975 hit single, "The Elephant Song".
- Patsy Montana, on her 1978 album, I Want to Be a Cowboy's Sweetheart.
- Wilma Lee Cooper and the Clinch Mountain Clan, on her 1979 album, A Daisy a Day.
- Glen Campbell, as the B-side to his 1981 single, "I Don't Want to Know Your Name". It was featured on his album, It's the World Gone Crazy.
- Berni Flint, as a single in 1983.
- Spike Jones Jr. recorded a version of the song which has never been released. Dr. Demento played it on his nationally syndicated radio show multiple times.
- Tony Kenny released his take in Ireland as the B-side to his 1990 single, "Where've You Been".
- D'Arcy Broderick, on his 2006 album, By Request.
- Dutch singer Conny Vandenbos released a Dutch take titled, Een Roosje Mijn Roosje ("A rose for my rose"), in 1974. A year later, she issued a German translation, Ein Röschen mein Röschen.
- Greg Page sings it on his Let It Be Me album.
