= Kilcorney =

Village in County Cork, Ireland

Kilcorney Cill Cóirne
- Village
- Location in Ireland
- Coordinates: 52°03′45″N 08°57′43″W
- Country: Ireland
- Province: Munster
- County: County Cork
- Time zone: UTC+0 (WET)
  - Summer (DST): UTC-1 (IST (WEST))

Kilcorney or Kilcorny (Irish: Cill Cóirne, meaning 'church of the stone fence (or weir)') is a small village and civil parish in the barony of Muskerry West in northwest County Cork, Ireland. It is situated approximately 38 km northwest of Cork, 17 km north of Macroom, and 7 km east of Millstreet. In 2006, the population of the Kilcorney electoral division was 305. Kilcorney is part of the Dáil constituency of Cork North-West.

== Geography ==
Townlands in Kilcorney include Crinaloo (North and South), North Horsemount, South Horsemount, Knockanroe, Laharn, Drombeg, Stonefield, Killeen, Glenleigh, Blackrock, Knockgorm, Lissacapia, Ivale, Mushera, Finnanefield, Baunreagh, Brookpark, Donoure.

The Kerrymans table is a large flat rock where people rested and goods were collected situated on the Old Butter Road on the slopes of Mushera mountain which was constructed in 1747. It is 3 miles from Kilcorney on the road to Rylane exactly midway between Killarney and Cork City, 25 miles on either side.

Mushera mountain overlooks Kilcorney standing at 2,118 feet high, the highest mountain in the Boggeragh range.

== Culture ==
The school in Kilcorney was built in 1864.

The Kilcorney Féis, a festival of traditional Irish arts and culture, is held in Kilcorney Community Centre each year. Page 19 of the lecture series, The Songs of Duhallow by Tim Browne identifies Kilcorney as the location for the tragic events in Sean McCarthys song Step It Out Mary.

== Sport ==
The local Gaelic Athletic Association clubs are Dromtarriffe GAA and St. John's GAA. Dromtarriffe plays Gaelic football and hurling at all levels, while St. John's is a Gaelic football club only. It has no underage level and competes at Junior "B" only.

== See also ==
- List of towns and villages in Ireland
