= Daisy a Day (album) =

1973 album by Jud Strunk

Studio album by Jud Strunk
- Released: 1973
- Genre: Country
- Length: 25:32
- Label: MGM
- Producer: Mike Curb, Don Costa

Jud Strunk chronology
| Jones' General Store (1971) | Daisy a Day (1973) | A Semi-Reformed Tequila Crazed Gypsy Looks Back (1977) |

Singles from Daisy a Day
- 1. "Daisy a Day"/"The Searchers" Released: November 1972; 2. "Next Door Neighbor's Kid"/"I'd Prefer to Do It All Again" Released: July 1973

Professional ratings
Review scores
| Source | Rating |
|---|---|
| Allmusic | 2/5 stars |

Daisy a Day is the third album by Jud Strunk and was released in 1973. It reached #18 on U.S. Top Country Albums chart and #138 on the Billboard 200.

The album featured two singles: "Daisy a Day", which reached #4 on the U.S. adult contemporary chart, #14 on the Billboard Hot 100, and #33 on the U.S. country chart, and "Next Door Neighbor's Kid", which reached #22 on the U.S. adult contemporary chart.

== Track listing ==
All songs written by Jud Strunk.

1. "Daisy a Day" – 2:48
2. "Bill Jones General Store" – 1:44
3. "The Runaway" – 2:30
4. "The Searchers" – 2:00
5. "The Long Ride Home" – 2:46
6. "Next Door Neighbor's Kid" – 2:53
7. "This House" – 3:00
8. "Jacob Brown" – 2:35
9. "If I Could Have My Way" – 2:52
10. "Farethewell" – 2:24

== Personnel ==
- Mike Curb – producer
- Don Costa – producer (tracks: 1–9), arranger
- Jim Vienneau – producer
- Jud Strunk – producer (track 10)

== Charts ==
| Chart (1973) | Peak position |
|---|---|
| Australia (Kent Music Report) | 25 |
| US Country | 18 |
| US Pop | 138 |

Singles

| Year | Single | Chart | Position |
|---|---|---|---|
| 1972 | "Daisy a Day" | US Country | 33 |
| 1972 | "Daisy a Day" | US Pop | 14 |
| 1972 | "Daisy a Day" | US AC | 4 |
| 1972 | "Daisy a Day" | CAN Country | 18 |
| 1972 | "Daisy a Day" | CAN Pop | 3 |
| 1972 | "Daisy a Day" | CAN AC | 5 |
| 1973 | "Next Door Neighbor's Kid" | US Country | 86 |
| 1973 | "Next Door Neighbor's Kid" | US AC | 22 |
| 1973 | "Next Door Neighbor's Kid" | CAN Country | 85 |
| 1973 | "Next Door Neighbor's Kid" | CAN AC | 50 |
