= Berni Flint =

- Born: 26 May 1952 (age 72); Southport, Lancashire, England
- Genres: Pop rock, folk rock, soft rock
- Occupation(s): Musician, singer-songwriter
- Instrument(s): Guitar, vocals
- Years active: 1977–present
- Labels: EMI Records

Bernard Flint (born 26 May 1952, in Southport, Lancashire, England) is a singer and songwriter who holds the record for the longest continuous run of wins on the ITV talent show, Opportunity Knocks.

== Career ==
A former Royal Navy sailor and window cleaner, television viewers voted him the show's best act for 12 successive weeks in early 1977.

After being propelled to fame by the show, Flint enjoyed a degree of success for a number of years. In terms of record sales, the highpoint of his career was reached when his single, "I Don't Want to Put a Hold On You", rose over a period of six weeks to number three in the UK Singles Chart, in the week ending 23 April 1977. Further success came in the form of another hit, "Southern Comfort", and one gold and two silver selling albums.

In the late 1970s, Flint presented the ITV show, Pop Gospel. In 1985, Flint was one of the co-presenters on the ITV television programme, Mooncat & Co.

Although no longer a commercial recording artist, Flint continues to perform regularly and is active on the after-dinner circuit. His song "I Don't Want to Put a Hold On You" appeared on the 2008 compilation album 70s Dinner Party.

== Discography ==
=== Albums ===
- 1977: I Don't Want to Put a Hold On You – UK No. 37
- 1978: Early Morning Rain
- 1979: Just Like a Movie
- 2009: Opportunity Strikes Twice

=== Singles ===
- 1977: "I Don't Want to Put a Hold On You" – UK No. 3
- 1977: "Southern Comfort" – UK No. 48
- 1977: "If I Had Someone Like You"
- 1978: "Smoke Gets in Your Eyes"
- 1979: "Dusk Till Dawn"
- 1979: "Only Me"
- 1980: "Don't Laugh At Me (Cause I'm a Fool)"
- 1983: "A Daisy a Day" – Bernie Flint (sic) with The Children of Freehold Community School, Oldham
