= Black Sabbath (album) =

1970 studio album by Black Sabbath

Studio album by Black Sabbath
- Released: 13 February 1970
- Recorded: 10 and 17 November 1969
- Studio: Regent Sounds Studio (London)
- Genres: Heavy metal; doom metal
- Length: 38:08 (UK) 39:24 (US)
- Labels: Vertigo (UK); Warner Bros. (US)
- Producer: Rodger Bain

Black Sabbath chronology
Black Sabbath (1970)	Paranoid (1970)

Singles from Black Sabbath
- 1. "Evil Woman" / "Wicked World" Released: 2 January 1970

Black Sabbath is the debut studio album by the English heavy metal band Black Sabbath, released on 13 February 1970 by Vertigo Records in the United Kingdom and on 1 June 1970 by Warner Bros. Records in the United States. After recording the single "Evil Woman" and its B-side "Wicked World" on 10 November 1969 at Trident Studios, the remainder of the album was recorded in a single 12-hour session on 17 November at Regent Sounds Studios, using songs from their live set to construct the album. The album's sound was largely informed by Iommi's playing style in the wake of a sheet metal accident that cut off two of his fingertips years prior.

Upon release, Black Sabbath received generally negative reviews from critics but reached number eight on the UK Albums Charts and number 23 on the US Billboard 200. Retrospectively, it has garnered reappraisal as the first true heavy metal album, one of the most influential works in the genre, and one of the greatest overall albums of all time. Additionally, its title track has been referred to as the first doom metal song, and was named the greatest heavy metal song of all time by Rolling Stone in 2023.

== Background and recording ==
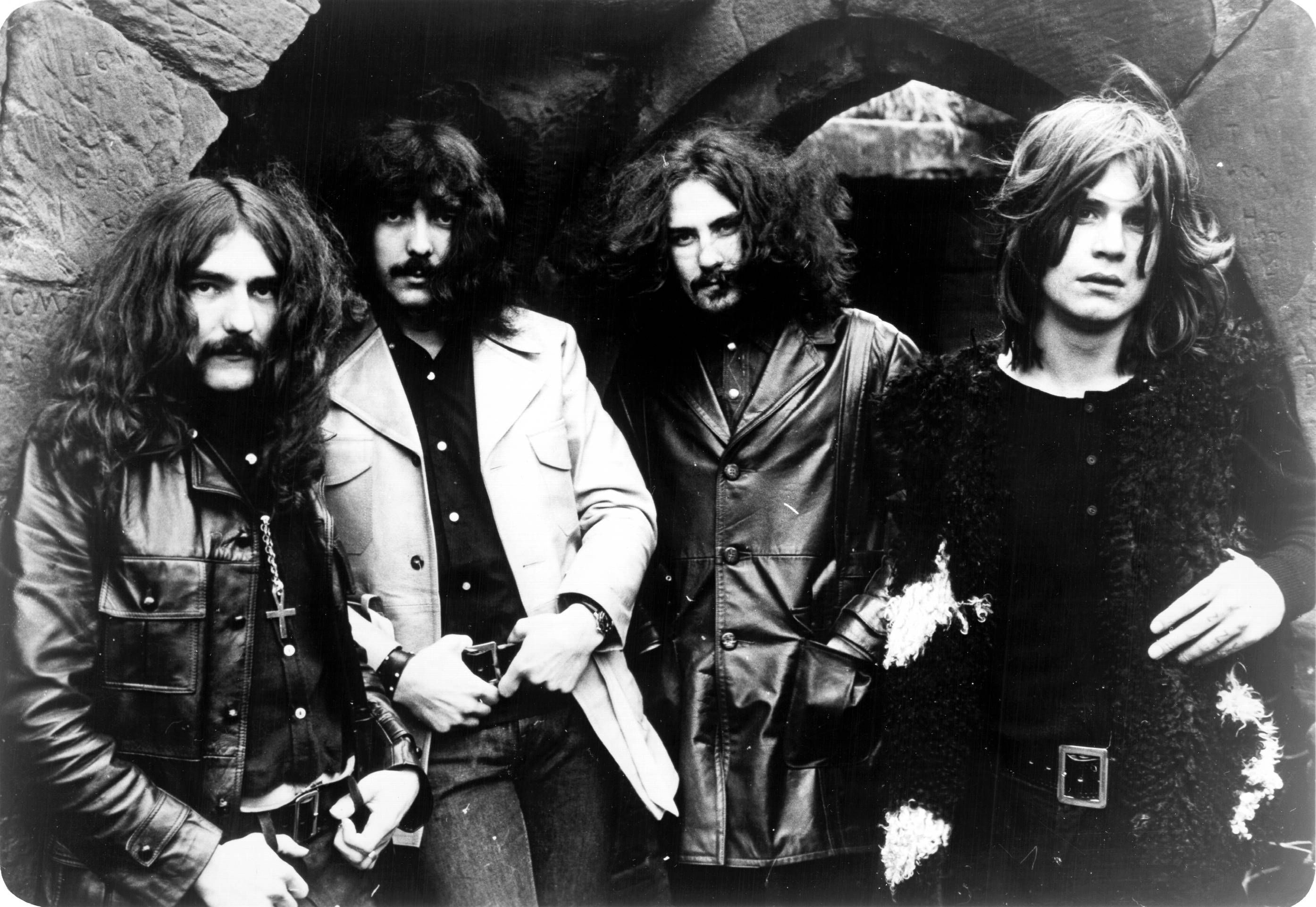
Black Sabbath in 1970. From left to right: Butler, Iommi, Ward, Osbourne.

Black Sabbath formed from the ashes of Mythology, which featured guitarist Tony Iommi and drummer Bill Ward. The two would recruit bassist Geezer Butler and vocalist Ozzy Osbourne as part of their new band, initially named Earth and later renamed to Black Sabbath, after the 1963 Italian horror film. After their live debut in Workington, England, the band would sign with Philips Records, and would receive distribution from the label's newly formed subsidiary, Vertigo Records.

The band recorded the song "Evil Woman" and its B-side '"Wicked World" on 10 November 1969 at Trident Studios on St. Anne's Court, London, and recorded the remainder of the album at Regent Sounds Studio on Denmark Street, in a 12-hour session on 17 November. Iommi said: "We just went in the studio and did it in a day, we played our live set and that was it. We actually thought a whole day was quite a long time, then off we went the next day to play for £20 in Switzerland." Aside from the bells, thunder and rain sound effects added to the beginning of the opening track and the double-tracked guitar solos on "N.I.B." and "Sleeping Village", there were virtually no overdubs added to the album. Iommi recalls recording live: "We thought, 'We have two days to do it and one of the days is mixing.' So we played live. Ozzy was singing at the same time, we just put him in a separate booth and off we went. We never had a second run of most of the stuff."

The key to the band's new sound on the album was Iommi's distinctive playing style that he developed after an accident at a sheet metal factory where he was working at the age of 17 in which the tips of the middle fingers of his fretting hand were severed. Iommi created a pair of false fingertips using plastic from a dish detergent bottle and changed the string arrangement of the guitar. Iommi replaced the second string with the first, the third with the second, and so on. In place of the first, he added a banjo string, to make it easier for him to bend the strings. Later, Iommi would downtune the guitar on the album Master of Reality, to make its playability even less painful. "I'd play a load of chords and I'd have to play fifths because I couldn't play fourths because of my fingers," Iommi explained to Phil Alexander in Mojo in 2013. "That helped me develop my style of playing, bending the strings and hitting the open string at the same time just to make the sound wilder." In the same article, bassist Geezer Butler added, "Back then the bass player was supposed to do all these melodic runs, but I didn't know how to do that because I'd been a guitarist, so all I did was follow Tony's riff. That made the sound heavier."

Iommi began recording the album with a white Fender Stratocaster, his guitar of choice at the time, until a malfunctioning pickup forced him to finish recording with a Gibson SG, a guitar he had recently purchased as a backup but had "never really played". The SG was a right-handed model, which the left-handed Iommi played upside down. Soon after recording the album, he met a right-handed guitarist who was playing a left-handed SG upside down, and the two agreed to swap guitars; this SG became Iommi's main guitar that he modified and later "put out to pasture" at the Hard Rock Cafe.

Black Sabbath vocalist Ozzy Osbourne has always spoken fondly of the recording of the band's debut album, stating in his autobiography I Am Ozzy, "Once we'd finished, we spent a couple of hours double-tracking some of the guitar and vocals, and that was that. Done. We were in the pub in time for last orders. It can't have taken any longer than 12 hours in total. That's how albums should be made, in my opinion." Drummer Bill Ward agrees, telling Guitar World in 2001, "I think the first album is just absolutely incredible. It's naïve, and there's an absolute sense of unity – it's not contrived in any way, shape or form. We weren't old enough to be clever. I love it all, including the mistakes!" In an interview for the Classic Albums series in 2010, Butler added, "It was literally live in the studio. I mean, (producer) Rodger Bain, I think he's a genius the way he captured the band in such a short time." In his autobiography Iron Man: My Journey Through Heaven & Hell with Black Sabbath, Iommi plays down the producer's role, insisting, "We didn't choose to work with Rodger Bain, he was chosen for us... He was good to have around, but we didn't really get a lot of advice from him. He maybe suggested a couple of things, but the songs were already fairly structured and sorted."

== Music and lyrics ==
On release, a writer for The Boston Globe described the music of Black Sabbath as "hard blues-rock". In retrospect, AllMusic's Steve Huey feels that Black Sabbath marks "the birth of heavy metal as we now know it". In his opinion, the album "transcends its clear roots in blues-rock and psychedelia to become something more". He ascribes its "sonic ugliness" as a reflection of "the bleak industrial nightmare" of the group's hometown, Birmingham, England. Huey notes the first side's allusions to themes characteristic of heavy metal, including evil, paganism, and the occult, "as filtered through horror films and the writings of J. R. R. Tolkien, H. P. Lovecraft, and Dennis Wheatley." He characterises side two as "given over to loose blues-rock jamming learned through" the English rock band Cream.

In the opinion of the author and former Metal Maniacs magazine editor Jeff Wagner, Black Sabbath is the "generally accepted starting point" when heavy metal "became distinct from rock and roll". In his opinion, the album represented a transition from blues rock into "something uglier", and that this sound "found deeper gravity via mournful singing and a sinister rhythmic pulse". According to Rolling Stone magazine, "the album that arguably invented heavy metal was built on thunderous blues-rock". Sputnikmusic's Mike Stagno notes that Black Sabbath's combined elements of rock, jazz and blues, with heavy distortion created one of the most influential albums in the history of heavy metal. In retrospect, Black Sabbath has been lauded as perhaps the first true heavy metal album. It has also been credited as the first record in the stoner rock genre.

Taking a broader perspective, Pete Prown of Vintage Guitar says, "The debut Black Sabbath album of 1970 was a watershed moment in heavy rock, but it was part of a larger trend of artists, producers, and engineers already moving towards the sound we now call hard rock and heavy metal."

"Black Sabbath"
The track features an early example of the diabolus in musica in heavy metal

Black Sabbath's music and lyrics were very dark for the time. The opening track is based almost entirely on a tritone interval played at slow tempo on the electric guitar. In the 2010 Classic Albums documentary on the making of the band's second album Paranoid, bassist Geezer Butler claims the riff was inspired by "Mars, the Bringer of War", a movement in Gustav Holst's The Planets. Iommi reinterpreted the riff slightly and redefined the band's direction. Ward told Classic Albums, "When Oz sang 'What is this that stands before me?' it became completely different...this was a different lyric now, this was a different feel. I was playing drums to the words." The song's lyrics concern a "figure in black" which Geezer Butler claims to have seen after waking up from a nightmare. In the liner notes to the band's 1998 live album Reunion the bassist remembers:

I'd been raised a Catholic so I totally believed in the Devil. There was a weekly magazine called Man, Myth and Magic that I started reading which was all about Satan and stuff. That and books by Aleister Crowley and Dennis Wheatley, especially The Devil Rides Out ... I'd moved into this flat I'd painted black with inverted crosses everywhere. Ozzy gave me this 16th Century book about magic that he'd stolen from somewhere. I put it in the airing cupboard because I wasn't sure about it. Later that night I woke up and saw this black shadow at the end of the bed. It was a horrible presence that frightened the life out of me! I ran to the airing cupboard to throw the book out, but the book had disappeared. After that I gave up all that stuff. It scared me shitless.

Similarly, the lyrics of the song "N.I.B." are written from the point of view of Lucifer, who falls in love with a human woman and "becomes a better person" according to lyricist Butler. Contrary to popular belief, the name of that song is not an abbreviation for "Nativity in Black;" according to Osbourne's autobiography it is merely a reference to drummer Bill Ward's pointed goatee at the time, which was shaped as a fountain pen-nib. The lyrics of two other songs on the album were written about stories with mythological themes. "Behind the Wall of Sleep" is a reference to the H. P. Lovecraft short story "Beyond the Wall of Sleep," while "The Wizard" was inspired by the character of Gandalf from The Hobbit and The Lord of the Rings. The latter includes harmonica playing by Osbourne. The band also recorded a cover of "Evil Woman," a song that had been an American hit for the band Crow. In his autobiography, Iommi admits the band reluctantly agreed to do the song at the behest of their manager Jim Simpson, who insisted they record something commercial.

== Artwork ==
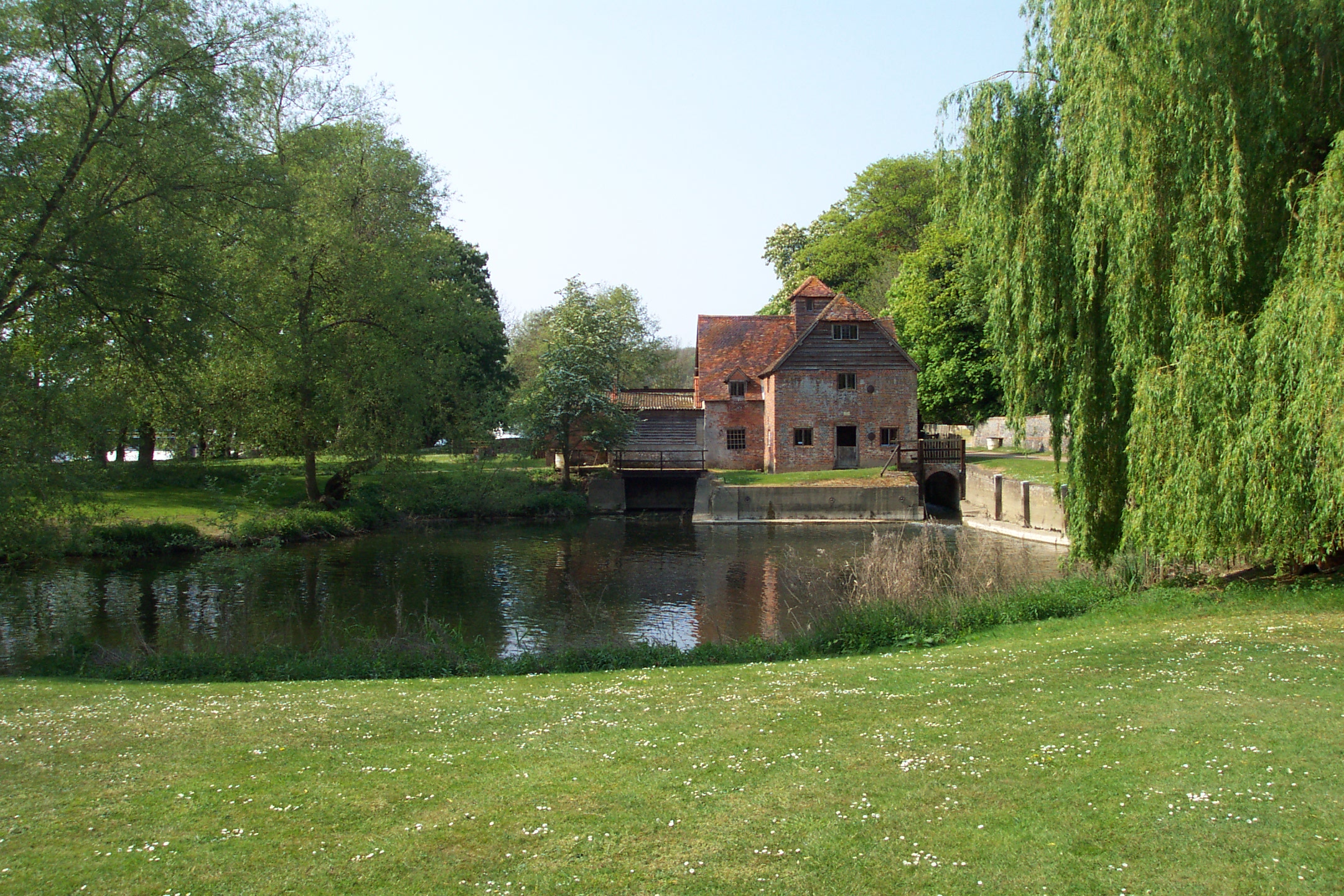
Mapledurham Watermill, which is featured on the album's cover art

The cover photograph was shot at Mapledurham Watermill, situated on the River Thames in Oxfordshire, England, by photographer Keith McMillan (credited as Keef), who was in charge of the overall design. Standing in front of the watermill is a figure dressed in a black cloak, portrayed by model Louisa Livingstone, whose identity was not widely known until 2020. "I'm sure (McMillan) said it was for Black Sabbath, but I don't know if that meant anything much to me at the time," Livingstone recalled, adding that it had been "freezing cold" during the shoot. "I had to get up at about 4 o'clock in the morning. Keith was rushing around with dry ice, throwing it into the water. It didn't seem to be working very well, so he ended up using a smoke machine," she said.

According to McMillan, Livingstone was wearing nothing underneath the black cloak, and some experimentation was done involving some "slightly more risqué" photographs taken at the session. "We decided none of that worked," McMillan said. "Any kind of sexuality took away from the more foreboding mood. But she was a terrific model. She had amazing courage and understanding of what I was trying to do."

The inner gatefold sleeve of the original release featured an inverted cross containing a poem written by Roger Brown, McMillan's photography assistant. The band were reportedly upset when they discovered this, as it fuelled allegations that they were satanists or occultists; however, in Osbourne's memoirs, he says that to the best of his knowledge nobody was upset with the inclusion. Iommi's recollection is somewhat different: "Suddenly we had all these crazy people turning up at shows," he told Mojo magazine in 2013. "I think Alex Sanders (high priest of the Wiccan religion) turned up at a gig once. It was all quite strange, really." The liner notes to the 1998 Reunion album state "Unbeknownst to the band, Black Sabbath was launched in the U.S. with a party with the head of the Church of Satan, Anton LaVey, presiding over the proceedings... All of a sudden Sabbath were Satan's Right Hand Men."

In the years since the iconic cover photo was shot, Livingstone has released electronic music under the name Indreba.

== Release and reception ==
Contemporary reviews
Review scores
Source	Rating
Christgau's Record Guide	C−

Black Sabbath was recorded for Fontana Records, but the record company elected to switch the band to another of their labels, Vertigo Records, which housed the company's more progressive acts. "I got a call from a guy, Olav Wyper, at a newly set-up label, Vertigo," recalled Sabbath manager Jim Simpson. "Olav had been at CBS when I took the album there, and said he'd now like to do a deal. This was only because, for Vertigo's second tranche of new releases, someone had failed to deliver masters for [the release with catalogue number] V06. So they signed Black Sabbath as a makeweight, because we had finished masters, which could be delivered in a hurry."

Released on Friday the 13th February 1970, Black Sabbath reached number eight on the UK Albums Charts. Following its United States release in June 1970 by Warner Bros. Records, the album reached number 23 on the Billboard Top LPs chart, where it remained for more than a year and sold one million copies. It received generally negative reviews from contemporary critics. Rolling Stone's Lester Bangs described the band as, "just like Cream! But worse", and he dismissed the album as "a shuck – despite the murky songtitles and some inane lyrics that sound like Vanilla Fudge paying doggerel tribute to Aleister Crowley, the album has nothing to do with spiritualism, the occult, or anything much except stiff recitations of Cream clichés". Robert Christgau, writing for The Village Voice, panned the album as "bullshit necromancy". He later described it as a reflection of "the worst of the counterculture", including "drug-impaired reaction time" and "long solos". In Mick Wall's book Black Sabbath: Symptom of the Universe, Butler reflects, "The London press absolutely hated us when we made it 'cos they'd never written an article about us, they didn't know of us. When our first album, the first week, went straight into the charts, the London press went, like, what the hell's going on here? And they've hated us ever since."

== Legacy ==
Retrospective reviews
Review scores
Source	Rating
AllMusic	4.5/5 stars
Collector's Guide to Heavy Metal	8/10
Encyclopedia of Popular Music	3/5 stars
MusicHound Rock	4/5 stars
The Rolling Stone Album Guide	5/5 stars
Sputnikmusic	4/5; 5/5
Uncut	7/10

Retrospective reviews of Black Sabbath have been positive. AllMusic reviewer Steve Huey said it was a highly innovative debut album with several classic metal songs, including the title track, which he felt had the "most definitive heavy metal riffs of all time". Huey was also impressed by how the band's "slowed-down, murky guitar rock bludgeons the listener in an almost hallucinatory fashion, reveling in its own dazed, druggy state of consciousness". In The Rolling Stone Album Guide (2004), journalist Scott Seward highlighted Bain's grandiose production on "an album that eats hippies for breakfast." In the opinion of Mike Stagno of Sputnikmusic, "both fans of blues influenced hard rock and heavy metal of all sorts should find something they like on the album." BBC Music's Pete Marsh referred to Black Sabbath as an "album that changed the face of rock music." Canadian journalist Martin Popoff called the album "a landmark debut" and the only one in the discography to suffer "the transitional step towards the concept of full metal".

In 1989, Kerrang! ranked Black Sabbath number 31 on their "100 Greatest Heavy Metal Albums of All Time". In 1994, it was ranked number 12 in Colin Larkin's Top 50 Heavy Metal Albums. Larkin praised the album's "crushing atmosphere of doom", which he described as "intense and relentless". In 2000, Q magazine included Black Sabbath in their list of the "Best Metal Albums of All Time", stating: "[This album] was to prove so influential it remains a template for metal bands three decades on." In 2003, it was ranked number 241 on Rolling Stone magazine's list of the 500 Greatest Albums of All Time, 243 in a 2012 revised list, and 355 in a 2020 revised list. Rolling Stone ranked Black Sabbath number 44 in their list of the 100 Best Debut Albums of All Time, describing the title track as the song that "would define the sound of a thousand bands". Additionally, in 2017, the magazine ranked it 5th on their list of "100 Greatest Metal Albums of All Time". The album was also included in the book 1001 Albums You Must Hear Before You Die.

== Track listing ==
All songs written by Tony Iommi, Geezer Butler, Bill Ward and Ozzy Osbourne, except where noted.

=== European edition ===
Side A, Standard Edition
No.	Title	Length
1.	"Black Sabbath"	6:20
2.	"The Wizard"	4:24
3.	"Behind the Wall of Sleep"	3:37
4.	"N.I.B."	6:08

Side B
No.	Title	Writer(s)	Length
5.	"Evil Woman" (Crow cover)	Larry Wiegand; Dick Wiegand; David Wagner	3:25
6.	"Sleeping Village"		3:46
7.	"Warning" (The Aynsley Dunbar Retaliation cover)	Aynsley Dunbar; Alex Dmochowski; Victor Hickling; John Moorshead	10:28
Total length:			38:08

1996 CD Reissue Bonus Track
No.	Title	Length
8.	"Wicked World"	4:47
Total length:		42:55

2009 Deluxe Edition of European Version, Disc Two
No.	Title	Length
1.	"Wicked World" (single B-side, TF1067)	4:44
2.	"Black Sabbath" (studio outtake)	6:22
3.	"Black Sabbath" (Instrumental)	6:13
4.	"The Wizard" (studio outtake)	4:46
5.	"Behind the Wall of Sleep" (studio outtake)	3:41
6.	"N.I.B." (instrumental (Note: Although it is described as an instrumental, it is a complete song with vocals.))	6:08
7.	"Evil Woman" (alternative version)	3:47
8.	"Sleeping Village" (intro)	3:45
9.	"Warning" (part 1)	6:58
Total length:		46:24

=== North American edition ===
Side A, Standard Edition
No.	Title	Length
1.	"Black Sabbath"	6:20
2.	"The Wizard"	4:22
3.	"Wasp / Behind the Wall of Sleep / Bassically / N.I.B."	9:44

Side B
No.	Title	Writer(s)	Length
4.	"Wicked World"		4:47
5.	"A Bit of Finger / Sleeping Village / Warning"	Iommi; Butler; Ward; Osbourne / Dunbar; Dmochowski; Hickling; Moorshead	14:15
Total length:			39:28

2004 Reissue Bonus Track
No.	Title	Writer(s)	Length
6.	"Evil Woman"	L. Weigand; D. Weigand; Wagner	3:25
Total length:			42:53

2016 Deluxe Edition of North American Version, Disc Two
No.	Title	Length
1.	"Evil Woman"	3:25
2.	"Black Sabbath" (studio outtake)	6:22
3.	"Black Sabbath" (Instrumental)	6:13
4.	"The Wizard" (studio outtake)	4:46
5.	"Behind the Wall of Sleep" (studio outtake)	3:41
6.	"N.I.B." (instrumental)	6:08
7.	"Evil Woman" (alternative version)	3:47
8.	"Sleeping Village" (intro)	3:45
9.	"Warning" (Part 1)	6:58
Total length:		45:05

The original North American Warner Bros. Records pressings of Black Sabbath list incorrect running times for "Wicked World" and the "Warning" medley (4:30 and 14:32, respectively), and also credit the album's original songs using the band members' given names (Anthony Iommi, John Osbourne, Terence Butler, and William Ward). The Castle Communications edition of 1986 also featured a live version of "Tomorrow's Dream" as a bonus track.

Disc two of the Deluxe Editions contains "N.I.B. (studio out-take)" with vocals, that was incorrectly listed as "N.I.B. (instrumental)".

== Personnel ==
=== Black Sabbath ===
- Ozzy Osbourne – vocals, harmonica on "The Wizard"
- Tony Iommi – guitar, slide guitar on "The Wizard"
- Geezer Butler – bass guitar
- Bill Ward – drums

=== Production ===
- Rodger Bain – production, Jew's harp on "Sleeping Village"
- Tom Allom – engineering
- Barry Sheffield – engineering
- Marcus Keef – graphic design, photography

== Charts ==
Chart (1970)	Peak position
Australian Albums (Kent Music Report)	8
Canada Top Albums/CDs (RPM)	29
Dutch Albums (Album Top 100)	6
Finnish Albums (The Official Finnish Charts)	13
French Albums (SNEP)	10
German Albums (Offizielle Top 100)	8
UK Albums (Official Charts)	8
US Billboard 200	23

Chart (2022–2025)	Peak position
Belgian Albums (Ultratop Flanders)	96
Greek Albums (IFPI)	18
Hungarian Physical Albums (MAHASZ)	14
Scottish Albums (Official Charts)	24
UK Independent Albums (Official Charts)	11
UK Rock & Metal Albums (Official Charts)	3

== Certifications ==
Region	Certification	Certified units/sales
Canada (Music Canada)	Gold	50,000^{^}
United Kingdom (BPI) 2009 deluxe edition	Gold	100,000^{^}
United States (RIAA)	Platinum	1,000,000^{^}
^{^} Shipments figures based on certification alone.

== Bibliography ==
- George-Warren, Holly, ed. (2001). The Rolling Stone Encyclopedia of Rock and Roll (2005 ed.). Fireside. ISBN 978-0-7432-9201-6.
- Graff, Gary; Durchholz, Daniel (1999). MusicHound Rock: The Essential Album Guide. Visible Ink Press. ISBN 978-1-57859-061-2.
- Huey, Steve. "Black Sabbath review". AllMusic. Archived from the original on 21 September 2016.
- Iommi, Tony; Lammers, T. J. (11 December 2012). Iron Man: My Journey through Heaven and Hell with Black Sabbath. Cambridge, Massachusetts: Da Capo Press. ISBN 978-0306821455.
- Larkin, Colin (1994). Guinness Book of Top 1000 Albums (1 ed.). Gullane Children's Books. ISBN 978-0-85112-786-6.
- Levy, Joe, ed. (2005). Rolling Stone's 500 Greatest Albums of All Time (First Paperback ed.). Wenner Books. ISBN 978-1-932958-61-4. Archived from the original on 12 February 2009.
- Osbourne, Ozzy (January 2010). I Am Ozzy. New York: Grand Central Publishing. ISBN 978-0-446-57313-9.
- Rosen, Steven (1996). The Story of Black Sabbath: Wheels of Confusion. Castle Communications. ISBN 1-86074-149-5.
- Wagner, Jeff (2010). Mean Deviation: Four Decades of Progressive Heavy Metal. Bazillion Points Books. ISBN 978-0979616334. Archived from the original on 31 May 2021.
