= Max Morath =

American songwriter (1926–2023)

- Born: October 1, 1926; Colorado Springs, Colorado, U.S.
- Died: June 19, 2023 (aged 96) Duluth, Minnesota, U.S.
- Genres: Ragtime
- Occupations: Musician, composer, actor author
- Instrument: Piano
- Years active: 1940s–2023
- Labels: Vanguard; RCA Victor; New World Records

Max Edward Morath (October 1, 1926 – June 19, 2023) was an American ragtime pianist, composer, actor, and author. He was best known for his piano playing and is referred to as "Mr. Ragtime". He was a touring performer as well as being variously a composer, recording artist, actor, playwright, and radio and television presenter. Rudi Blesh billed Morath as a "one-man ragtime army".

== Early life and education ==
Max Edward Morath was born in Colorado Springs, Colorado. He studied piano and harmony as a child and was exposed to the rudiments of ragtime piano by his mother, a schooled pianist who had spent several years playing for silent films. He received a bachelor's degree in English from Colorado College in 1948, before embarking on a career that included jobs in radio and television, jazz, and theater. In the midst of this, Morath earned a master's degree from Columbia University in 1996 in American studies.

== Career ==
=== Early years ===
His appearances as pianist and musical director with melodrama companies in Cripple Creek and Durango, Colorado, triggered his interest in early American popular music and theater, including a study of its social and economic history, largely inspired by George and Ira Gershwin, Irving Berlin, and his ragtime heroes Eubie Blake and Scott Joplin.

=== 1960s television and theater work ===
Morath's work in television and theater during the 1960s preceded the 1970s ragtime revival and had an influence on how it was constituted. Commenting on the significance of ragtime, Morath stated, "Scorned by the establishment as ephemeral at best, trashy at worst, ragtime was the fountainhead of every rhythmic and stylistic upheaval that has followed in a century of ever-evolving American popular music", and on Morath, Eric Salzman wrote in Stereo Review: "[t]he person who kept rag alive almost single-handedly during all the dark years was really Max Morath."

From 1959 to 1961 Morath wrote, performed, and co-produced 26 half-hour television programs for PBS, then NET (National Educational Television). The programs were produced by Rocky Mountain PBS in Denver (then known as KRMA Channel 6) and were fed nationally to the public broadcasting network. The Ragtime Era series showcased the development of the music of that period and brought him national recognition. It was followed by the Turn of the Century series, which dealt with popular music's interaction with the nation's social history (and which he afterwards turned into a one-man touring show). The productions were in syndication throughout the 1960s. In addition to his television series, Morath made other contributions to NPR and PBS. He appeared on The Bell Telephone Hour, Kraft Music Hall, Today, and The Tonight Show. From 1965 to 1972, he was a regular guest of Arthur Godfrey on CBS Radio, and he appeared with Godfrey in television guest appearances.

=== Touring shows ===
Moving from Colorado to New York around 1963, Morath was by then performing nationally in college concerts and nightclubs, including New York's Blue Angel and the Village Vanguard with his Original Rag Quartet. His one-man show, Max Morath at the Turn of the Century, was a critical success and played Off-Broadway at the Jan Hus Playhouse in 1969, followed by a four-year national tour. Other similar productions followed: The Ragtime Years, Living the Ragtime Life, The Ragtime Man, Ragtime Revisited, plus Ragtime and Again. These productions also toured nationally following Off-Broadway openings. Morath continued touring until 2007.

=== Writings ===
In 1996, Morath earned a master's degree from Columbia University in American Studies. His thesis was based on the life and work of songwriter Carrie Jacobs-Bond (1862–1946), composer of "I Love You Truly" and other popular songs. Morath's research on her and her times later led to his writing a self-published biographical novel about Jacobs-Bond told in her voice (2008).

With his wife Diane Fay Skomars, Morath co-created an illustrated book on his experiences on the road, titled Max Morath: The Road to Ragtime.

Morath's musical revue One For The Road, a serio-comic exploration of American culture's dealings with drugs and alcohol, was produced in 1982 by the Repertory Theatre of St. Louis and MUNI.

2002 saw the publication of his book The NPR Curious Listener's Guide to Popular Standards, an authoritative overview of the Great American Songbook.

The screenplay of Blind Boone, written by Morath and his colleague Moss Hall, was a first-prize winner in the category 'Music-Inspired Drama' at the Nashville Film Festival in March 2015.

Morath's interest in American popular culture extended to the work of humorist Finley Peter Dunne (1867–1936), creator of the popular "Mister Dooley" editorials. An academic article he wrote on Dunne's work titled Translating Mister Dooley: A New Examination of the Journalism of Finley Peter Dunne was published in the Journal of American Culture in 2004. Dunne's editorials also form the text of Morath's musical play "Trust Everybody... but Cut the Cards," presented in staged readings at the York Theater in New York. He had been working on a 60,000-word volume of "translations" of Dunne's writings out of the Irish dialect in which they were originally published and into standard English.

=== Recordings ===
After recording a handful of albums in the then-popular honky-tonk style, Morath recorded albums for Vanguard, Epic, Solo Art and RCA. These included solo piano and vocal albums, performances with his Original Rag Quartet and orchestral works. He also recorded five vocal albums with the team of William Bolcom and Joan Morris. Morath's 1969 album, At The Turn of the Century, encapsulated the essence of his television series and live shows, and helped usher in the 1970s ragtime revival. Albums that followed included Jonah Man, Ragtime Women, and The Great American Piano Bench, each of which went beyond the then-current focus on Scott Joplin. His 1992 album, The Ragtime Man, included his own ragtime composition "Cripple Creek Suite", about the mood of the region's gold rush days. In 2015 all of his ragtime pieces were recorded by Aaron Robinson for the album Max Morath: The Complete Ragtime Works for Piano on the MAI label.

In the early 1970s, Morath recorded four vinyl LPs for the Vanguard label which presented ragtime in an unprecedented fashion: namely, recording and presenting ragtime in a truly serious manner, and creating four non-commercial albums for a commercial recording company. These albums notedly highlighted Morath's pianistic abilities for a warmth and roundness of tone; a spontaneity and lightness of touch; and a complex use of dynamics, changes of mood and tempi. He has also been recognized as a major influence on younger pianists recording ragtime.

== Death ==
Morath died in Duluth, Minnesota, on June 19, 2023, at age 96.

== Awards and honors ==
- In 2008, Morath received the Louis T. Benezet Award from Colorado College.
- In 2016, Morath was inducted into the Colorado Music Hall of Fame.
- In 2022, Morath received the Glenn Jenks Lifetime Achievement Award.

== Partial bibliography ==
Solo authored

- Best of Ragtime Piano. Mel Bay Productions. 1987. ISBN 0-7866-8137-3.
- "Ragtime Then and Now". In The Oxford Companion to Jazz, Bill Kirchner, ed. Oxford University Press, 2000, pp. 29–38. ISBN 0-19-512510-X
- The NPR Curious Listener's Guide to Popular Standards. Penguin-Perigee Trade. 2002. ISBN 978-0-399-52744-9.
- Original Rags for Piano. Hal Leonard. 2008. ISBN 978-1-4234-5816-6.
- I Love You Truly: A Biographical Novel Based on the Life of Carrie Jacobs-Bond. iUniverse. 2008. ISBN 978-0-595-53017-5.

Coauthored

- Morath, Max; Skomars, Diane Fay; Schoenstein, Ralph (1999). Max Morath : The Road to Ragtime. Virginia Beach, VA: Donning Company/Publishers. ISBN 1578640687.

About

- Skomars, Diane Fay (2025). Loving Mr. Ragtime: Max Morath. Mill City Press Inc. ISBN 979-8868506352.

== Discography ==
=== Albums ===
Year	Title	Record label
1954	Max Morath at the Gold Bar Room	Gold Camp
1956	Max Morath at the Gold Bar Room, Volume II	Gold Camp
1957	Max Morath At The Mighty Gold Bar Piano	Gold Camp Recordings
1957	Music for Moochers, Gold Diggers, and Cattle Rustlers (Comical saloon crowd noises overdubed on selections from the previous albums)	Talking Machine Records
1958	Honky Tonk in Hi-Fi	Gold Camp
1959	More Morath	Gold Camp
1963	Presenting that Celebrated Maestro	Epic
1964	Oh, Play That Thing: The Ragtime Era	Epic
1966	They All Play Ragtime (with other performers)	Jazzology
1969	Max Morath at the Turn of The Century	RCA-Victor
1972	The Best of Scott Joplin & Other Rag Classics	Vanguard
1973	The World of Scott Joplin	Vanguard
1974	Irving Berlin: The Ragtime Years	Vanguard
1975	Max Morath Plays Ragtime	Vanguard
1975	The World of Scott Joplin, Volume 2	Vanguard
1976	Good Friends Are for Keeps (with other performers)	Bell System/United Artists
1976	Jonah Man: A Tribute to Bert Williams (1996 CD release added four tracks from Morath's 1981 album)	Vanguard
1977	Living The Ragtime Life (not to be confused with similarly titled later release)	Vanguard
1977	The Ragtime Women	Vanguard
1977	These Charming People (with Bolcom & Morris)	RCA-Red Seal
1978	Don't Give the Name a Bad Place (with other performers)	New World Records
1979	Max Morath in Jazz Country	Vanguard
1979	The Great American Piano Bench	Vanguard
1981	Max Morath & His Ragtime Stompers	Vanguard
1981	More Rodgers and Hart (with Bolcom & Morris)	RCA
1984	Pop!! Goes The Music!	Normacks
1987	Living a Ragtime Life (1990 SoloArt CD version contained additional tracks and is re-sequenced)	Normacks
1990	Drugstore Cabaret	Premier
1990	The Ragtime Century	PianoMania Music Publishing
1990	Fountain Favorites from the World of Coca-Cola (with Bolcom & Morris)	Coke
1992	The Ragtime Man	Omega Music
1993	Siren Songs (Piano Accompaniment for vocalist Ann Fennessy )	Bilnan Productions
1994	Real American Folk Songs	Solo Art
2003	Sing Yip Harburg (with Bolcom & Morris)	Original Cast
2004	Sing Gus Kahn (with Bolcom & Morris)	Original Cast
2005	One for fhe Road (Compilation, Includes Previously Unreleased Material)	Skomax
2015	Max Morath: The Complete Ragtime Works for Piano (Performed by Aaron Robinson)	MAI

== See also ==
- List of ragtime composers
