= Crow (band) =

American rock band

- Origin: Minneapolis-St. Paul, Minnesota, U.S.
- Genres: Hard rock; blues rock; psychedelic rock; garage rock
- Years active: 1967–1972, 1980–1982, 1988–present
- Label: Amaret
- Members: David Wagner; Dick Wiegand; Larry Wiegand; Kink Middlemist; Harry Nehls; Dennis Craswell; Norm Steffen
- Website: thecrowband.com

Crow is an American rock band that was first active from 1967 to 1972. They are best known for the song "Evil Woman (Don't Play Your Games with Me)", which was notably covered by Black Sabbath (on their debut album) and Ike & Tina Turner with the title "Evil Man".

== History ==
Crow was formed in 1967 by singer David Wagner, guitarist Dick Wiegand, bassist Larry Wiegand, keyboardist Kink Middlemist, and drummer Harry Nehls under the name South 40, which was used until the group went national. Nehls was replaced by Denny Craswell at that time. Columbia Records brought them in to record a demo in 1969; they passed, and Crow was signed to Amaret Records.

In 1969, Crow's debut album Crow Music was recorded. The single "Evil Woman (Don't Play Your Games With Me)" made the Top 40 of the Billboard Hot 100 that fall, peaking at No. 19 the following January. Crow by Crow and Mosaic were the follow-up releases in 1970 and 1971, respectively. Several later singles managed to chart, although none reached the heights of "Evil Woman". Eventually, the band wanted to move to Elektra Records, but Amaret would not release them from their recording contract while retaining their name. Wagner left the group in 1971; the band replaced him with Mick Stanhope and attempted to continue, but collapsed for good in 1972. David Wagner recorded a solo album for Amaret in late 1972 titled d/b/a Crow.

They disbanded in 1972, but reformed again in 1980. This version of Crow included original lead vocalist David Wagner, John Richardson and Jeff Christensen on lead guitar/vocals, Denny Johnson on bass and Robby Belleville on drums. From September 1980 to July 1981, they recorded many sessions, which resulted in a new studio album titled Crow on the Run in 1982. This version of Crow disbanded in early 1982. In 1988, Crow reformed and they continued to play concerts all over the United States. All the members have won Minnesota Music Awards for their own individual instruments. In 2005, they were inducted into the Minnesota Rock/Country Hall of Fame and, in 2009, the Iowa Rock & Roll Music Hall of Fame.

Crow still play occasionally in the Midwest with Dave Wagner on vocals.

== Discography ==
=== Live albums ===
- 1968 Live at Someplace Else – (as by South 40)

=== Studio albums ===
- 1969 Crow Music
- 1970 Crow by Crow
- 1971 Mosaic
- 1972 d/b/a Crow (David Wagner – solo)
- 1981 Crow on the Run (Northwest U.S. release only)

=== Compilation albums ===
- 1972 Best of Crow
- 1992 Evil Woman: The Best of Crow
- 2007 Classics: 1969–1972
- 2007 Before the Storm (David Wagner – solo)
- 2013 The Best of Crow

All releases on Amaret, except for Live at Someplace Else (Metrobeat), Evil Woman: The Best of Crow (K-Tel/Era), Classics: 1969–1972 (Noiseland Industries), The Best of Crow (Sundazed) and Before the Storm (K-Tel).

=== Singles ===
- 1969 "Time to Make a Turn" (US No. 123)
- 1969 "Evil Woman (Don't Play Your Games With Me)" (US No. 19) (Can No. 15)
- 1970 "Cottage Cheese" (US No. 56)
- 1970 "Slow Down" (US No. 103)
- 1970 "(Don't Try to Lay No Boogie Woogie on the) King of Rock N' Roll" (US No. 55) (Can No. 52)
- 1971 "Watching Can Waste Up Time"
- 1971 "Yellow Dawg"
- 1972 "Mobile Blues" (David Wagner – solo)
- 1972 "Cado Queen" (David Wagner – solo)

All releases on Amaret Records.

== Members ==
- David Wagner – vocals (1967–1971)
- Dick Wiegand – guitar (1967–1972)
- Larry Wiegand – bass (1967–1972)
- Dave "Kink" Middlemist – keyboards (1967–1972)
- Harry Nehls – drums (1967–1969)
- Denny Craswell – drums (1969–1972)
- Mike Mlazgar – drums (1969)
- Mick Stanhope – vocals (1971–1972)
- Chico Perez – percussion (1971–1972)

Lisa Wenger- vocalist (2016-2026)
