= Step It Out Mary =

Traditional Irish ballad

Song
- Genre: Ballad; Irish traditional
- Songwriter: Sean McCarthy

"Step It Out Mary" (also "Step It Out Mary My Fine Daughter") is a traditional-style Irish ballad. In 1999, The Companion to Irish Traditional Music credited Sean McCarthy with penning the song, and the song is generally dated to around 1955.

The song has since become widely performed within Irish folk music and has been recorded by numerous artists across several decades, including Danny Doyle, The Dubliners, The High Kings and The Irish Descendants.

== Background and Authorship ==
Sean McCarthy, a native of Listowel, County Kerry, composed ballads in a traditional Irish idiom, drawing on the songwriting traditions of his native area; the Folk Music Society of Ireland described him in 1989 as the writer of numerous popular and widely recorded songs "in traditional idiom". Step It Out Mary itself developed from a children's skipping rhyme that McCarthy heard in Kanturk, County Cork in the 1950s In his 1983 book The Road to Song: Sean McCarthy, His Songs, Their Music and Story, he recalled watching children sing the rhyme while skipping and subsequently attempting to discover whether any additional verses existed. Finding none, he developed the refrain into a complete narrative song.

The song tells the story of Mary, a young woman whose father insists that she marry a wealthy countryman despite her love for a soldier. On the night of her wedding, Mary and the soldier are found drowned together in a nearby stream. Although many recorded versions place the song in "Kilgory", in the parish of Kilnoe in County Clare, Tim Browne in his 2015 Songs of Duhallow lecture names Kilcorney as the original setting.

The song's narrative centres on a conflict between romantic love and parental authority: Mary rejects the wealth offered by a prospective husband because she has pledged herself to a soldier, but her father orders her to marry the wealthier suitor. The story ends with Mary and the soldier drowning together. The song develops a children's skipping rhyme into a tragic narrative concerning Mary, her father's insistence that she marry a wealthy countryman, and her love for a soldier.

=== Publication and recordings ===
McCarthy published collections of his songs during his lifetime. The Irish Traditional Music Archive holds his 1973 collection The Songs of Sean McCarthy, as well as later archival material containing performances of Step It Out Mary.

The song was later recorded by a number of Irish folk performers. The Dubliners included it as the opening track of their 1996 album Further Along. The High Kings subsequently recorded and regularly performed the song. In 2024 the group named an international concert series the Step It Out World Tour, with performances announced in Ireland, the United Kingdom, Germany, the United States, Canada, Australia and other countries. The song remains in active performance within Irish folk music, with recorded and live versions by numerous artists internationally.

=== Variants ===
Several versions of the song differ in both setting and narrative details. The apparent original version reproduced by Tim Browne in The Songs of Duhallow places the story in Kilcorney, County Cork. In that version Mary refuses the wealthy suitor because she loves a soldier; after her father orders her to marry the countryman, Mary and the soldier are subsequently found drowned together in a stream.

However, other versions differ considerably. One text associated with McCarthy relocates the story to Castle Rising and Downham Market in England and gives the song a different ending, in which Mary's lover is killed and Mary shoots the countryman on her wedding day before being acquitted by a jury.

== Publications ==
- Jones, Tom (1967). "Step It Out Mary". Major.
- Doyle, Danny (1967). Step It Out Mary (extended play). Tribune.
- The Irish Rovers (September 1973). The Irish Rovers Live!. Interfusion.
- The Dayhills (15 October 1976). Bob's Favorite Irish Music in America (phonograph record). Biscuit City Records.
- Boiled in Lead (1989). From the Ladle to the Grave. Atomic Theory.
