= Kenny Myers =

- Born: Kenneth S. Myers
- Occupation(s): Vice president, Mercury Records; General manager, Acta Records; Owner, Amaret Records; Sales rep, Regensteiner Printing

Kenny Myers was an executive at Mercury Records during the 1960s. He later became general manager for a subsidiary of Dot Records. He also ran his own record label, Amaret Records. He left the music industry in the mid-1970s for the Regensteiner Printing Company. He is also a former musician.

== Musical background ==
Before he joined Mercury Records, he was a trumpet player with the Eddy Howard Orchestra. He sang and played alongside fellow trumpeter, vocalist, Bob Capelli. From 1946 - 1947, he played alongside Capelli and Sid Commings. He was also part of a vocal trio that consisted of Eddy Howard and Norman Lee. When Myers left he was replaced on trumpet and vocals by Wally Fobart. It also appears that Myers may have recorded under his own name for Leo Records.

== Employment history ==
By 1950 Myers was working for Sam Honigberg, handling DJ promotion, working out of Honigberg's Chicago office.

=== Mercury Records ===
During the 1950s, Myers was promotion chief for Mercury Records. In July 1954, having just come back from vacation, he suffered an injury to his back while unloading his car. He ended up in traction at Chicago's Michael Reese Hospital. In relation to a slipped disc, he joked that the doctors were having a hard time choosing whether to use a 78 RPM or 45 RPM replacement. By 1960, he was vice-president in charge of sales and supervised the whole field of sales staff. All regional heads of sales were under his management, reporting directly to him. Later in the early 1960s, he had become a vice-president at Mercury.

=== Dot Records ===
In 1966, Myers resigned from his position with Mercury Records to join Dot Records. In less than a year he became the general manager for a new label, Acta Records, a subsidiary of Dot. Acta celebrated an RIAA certification in early 1968 that marked a million sales for The American Breed's "Bend Me, Shape Me".

=== Amaret Records ===
Myers left Acta Records in August 1968 to form the Amaret label. During the label's lifetime, it signed artists such as Crow, Judy Lynn and Mrs Miller. Myers was credited as executive producer and production supervisor on many of the label's recordings. By 1973 however, Amaret was bankrupt, and later sold to MGM Records. Myers left the music industry in 1974 to become the Los Angeles representative for the Regensteiner Printing Company.
