= Gabriel Fitzmaurice =

Irish poet (born 1952)

Gabriel Fitzmaurice (born 1952) is an Irish poet, writer, translator, broadcaster, teacher and musician from Moyvane, County Kerry. He has published poetry in both English and Irish, children's verse, translations from Irish, essays and collections of songs and ballads. He is a former chair and literary adviser of Listowel Writers' Week and has been closely associated with the literary culture of north Kerry.

== Early life and teaching ==
Fitzmaurice was born in 1952 in Moyvane, County Kerry. He trained as a primary-school teacher and later taught for more than three decades in Moyvane, eventually serving as principal of the local national school before his retirement.

Teaching became an important influence on his writing, particularly his poetry for children. By 2016 he had published thirteen collections of children's poetry.

== Literary career ==
Fitzmaurice became involved with Listowel Writers' Week in 1979, initially representing the Listowel Drama Group. He was appointed director of the festival's ballad competition and became chairman in 1982, remaining in the position for four years.

During his involvement with the festival he helped broaden its programme and worked with organisations including Poetry Ireland. Writers who appeared at the festival during his period as chairman included Kazuo Ishiguro, Roddy Doyle, Ted Hughes, John Montague and Eavan Boland.

After attending a lecture on radio writing by broadcaster Dick Warner, Fitzmaurice submitted poetry to RTÉ. He was subsequently invited to present a series of Poems Plain on RTÉ Radio 1. RTÉ filmed him at Listowel Writers' Week in 1986 describing the festival as a community in which writers could develop their work.

His first collection of poetry for adults, Rainsong, was published by Beaver Row Press in 1984 and launched by John B. Keane at Listowel Writers' Week. His first collection for children, The Moving Stair, appeared in 1989.

His later collections include The Space Between: New and Selected Poems 1984–92, The Wrenboy's Carnival: Poems 1980–2000 and The Boghole Boys. In 2024 Mercier Press published The Best Loved Poems of Gabriel Fitzmaurice, a selection drawn from more than four decades of his work.

== Style and themes ==
Fitzmaurice's poetry is frequently associated with rural life, memory, family, local history and the oral and musical traditions of north Kerry. Reviewing his work in The Irish Times in 1996, Fred Johnston noted its strong connection to song and folk ballad and its emphasis on everyday experience, memory and local history.

Fitzmaurice has also written and translated extensively in Irish and has translated poetry from Irish into English. His 2025 collection The Best-Loved Poems from the Irish brought together translations ranging from early Irish-language poets to contemporary writers.

== Music and folklore ==
In addition to poetry, Fitzmaurice has worked as a singer, musician and collector of traditional songs. He began collecting songs in the Moyvane area during the 1970s after encountering local traditional singers, and later published and edited collections of songs and ballads.

He has performed on recordings of Irish traditional music and has appeared on radio and television discussing literature, education and the arts.

== Awards and recognition ==
Fitzmaurice was a prizewinner in the Gerard Manley Hopkins Centenary Poetry Competition and represented Ireland twice at the European Festival of Poetry in Louvain, Belgium.

In 2025 he received the Kerry Association in Dublin Arts Award for his contribution to poetry, translation, children's literature, music and Irish cultural life. The association described his work as encompassing more than fifty books, including poetry in English and Irish, children's writing, translations, essays and collections of songs and ballads.

== Selected bibliography ==
=== Poetry ===
- Rainsong (1984)
- The Space Between: New and Selected Poems 1984–92 (1993)
- The Wrenboy's Carnival: Poems 1980–2000 (2000)
- The Boghole Boys (2005)
- The Best Loved Poems of Gabriel Fitzmaurice (2024)

=== Children's poetry ===
- The Moving Stair (1989)
- Will You Be My Friend? (2016)
- Really Rotten Rhymes

=== Translation ===
- The Best-Loved Poems from the Irish (2025)

== See also ==
- Listowel Writers' Week
- Irish poetry
- Irish-language literature
