= Amaret Records =

- Parent company: MGM Records from 1972
- Founded: 1968
- Status: Defunct
- Genre: Various
- Country of origin: United States
- Location: Hollywood, California

Amaret Records was a record label that operated between 1968 and 1973. Among the artists that had their recordings released on the label were hard rock group Crow, Country singer Judy Lynn and singer Mrs Miller.

== Background ==
The label was located on Highland Avenue, Hollywood, California. It was formed by Kenny Myers in 1968 who had left Dot Records and its subsidiary Acta Records in August that year to form the new label. Ronnie Granger formerly of Capitol Records was brought in as sales and promotion director.

Overseas distribution was handled by London Records. Australian distribution was handled by Astor Records. South African and Spanish distribution were handled by Gallo and Hispavox respectively. By November 1968, he has 30 domestic distributors lined up. The non-exclusive duplication rights for reel-reel, eight-track and cassette were assigned to Ampex. In an article in an April 1971 issue of Billboard, Myers said that all of the label's releases would be lyric oriented. He felt that people wanted to get back to the basics. He also said that this was the era of the writer and songs, where songs that were being bought were the ones that concentrated on the message rather than any particular instrumental approach. He used the film Love Story as an example of having a message that everyone could understand.

By 1973, the label was bankrupt.

== Artists ==
Other early artists on the label included rock group New Life and the bubblegum rock acts of Ginny Tieu and Tom & Jerry. There was a pop-rock group from Chicago called Raintree Minority, a pop singer Lilith O'Leary, Triangle a western blues group and Johnny Cymbal. There was also Mrs Miller. 1970, looked to be a busier year, according to an article in the August 1 edition of Billboard Magazine, the label was putting an emphasis on increasing outside production, and within the next 90 days, a plan to double the number of outside packs. Part of that effort in expansion was the proposed signing of artist Gil Bernal under the production of Joe Porter and Jerry Styner. There was also the signing of a two-man rock act called Honk. There was also some potential promise with Nick Anthony, an artist referred to in Billboard as possibly "another Tom Jones" who had the album High Voltage released. In 1972, Judy Lynn had her single "Winterwood" which was a departure from her previous country sound to a more pop MOR sound.

== Catalogue (Selective) ==
=== Albums ===
- Mrs. Miller - Mrs. Miller Does Her Thing - Amaret ST-5000 - (1970)
- Triangle - How Now Blue Cow - Amaret ST-5001 - (1970)
- Crow - Crow Music - Amaret ST-5002 - (1970)
- Randy Johnson - The Gift of Randy Johnson - ST-5003 - (1970)
- New Life - The New Life Sings the Sidehackers - ST-5004 - (1970)
- Fresh Air - Fresh Air - ST-5005 - (1970)
- Crow - Crow By Crow - ST-5006 - (1970)
- Dave Antrell - Dave Antrell - ST-5007 - (1970)
- Nick Anthony - High Voltage - ST-5008 - (1970)
- Crow - Mosaic By Crow - ST-5009 - (1971)
- Dian Hart - Girl for All Reasons - ST-5010 - (1971)
- Judy Lynn - Parts of Love - ST-5011 - (1971)
- Crow - Best of Crow - ST-5012 - (1972)
- David Wagner - David Wagner D/B/A Crow- ST-5013 - (1972)
- Judy Lynn - Naturally - ST-5014 - (1972)

== Links ==
- Amaret singles on 45Cat
- Amaret singles at Global Dog Productions
