= Jud Strunk =

American singer-songwriter (1936–1981)

Background information
- Born: Justin Roderick Strunk Jr. June 11, 1936; Jamestown, New York, U.S.
- Died: October 5, 1981 (aged 45) Carrabassett Valley, Maine, U.S.
- Genres: Country, pop
- Occupation: Singer-songwriter
- Instruments: Vocals, banjo
- Years active: 1973–1976
- Labels: Columbia, MGM, MCA

Justin Roderick Strunk Jr. (June 11, 1936 – October 5, 1981), better known as Jud Strunk, was an American singer-songwriter and comedian.

== Biography ==
=== Early years ===
Born in Jamestown, New York, United States, he was raised in Buffalo, New York, where as a small boy his showmanship became evident. After he learned to play the banjo, Strunk began entertaining locals and went on to wide recognition after appearances on national television network shows such as Rowan & Martin's Laugh-In and The Tonight Show Starring Johnny Carson. He toured for 3 years across North America with ragtime composer-pianist Glenn Jenks between 1975 and 1978.

=== Academic ===
He graduated from the Virginia Military Institute in 1959 with a B.A in History.

=== "Daisy A Day" ===
Although much of Strunk's material was humorous, his most popular song was not. "Daisy a Day", which Strunk wrote and recorded in 1973, is a gentle, sentimental ballad in 3/4 time, describing the relationship between a boy and girl who ultimately grow old together. For every day of their lives, he gives her a daisy as a sign of their love. In the last verse, she has died, but her widower husband continues to make daily visits to her grave. The song made the Billboard Top 20 on both the country and pop music charts. A cover version, Een Roosje, M'n Roosje (A Rose, My Rose) by Conny Vandenbos, reached No. 7 on the Dutch Top 40 hit list in 1974.

=== Laugh-In ===
Strunk was a regular member of the Laugh-In cast during its last season in 1972 and 1973.— During the Laugh-In Looks at the News segment, he often reported fictitious sporting events "directly from Farmington, Maine, spahts capitol of the wahld".

=== Other material ===
Strunk also wrote three humorous songs that made it into the country music charts, and he toured with the Andy Williams Road Show. One of these songs, "The Biggest Parakeets in Town," was a tongue-in-cheek story of a woman who is a bird fancier. Its central joke is the unspoken pun of "parakeets/pair o'tits" used in the title. Other singles, such as "Next Door Neighbor's Kid" (released in Dutch as "Sjakie Van De Hoek" and in German as "Jan Von Nebenan", respectively by Conny Vandenbosch) and the patriotic "My Country," appeared on various Billboard surveys. Strunk also scored a songwriting hit with "Bill Jones' General Store", the title track of his 1971 album of a similar name; Canadian musician Tommy Hunter charted in the top 20 on the country and adult contemporary charts in Canada with the song.

=== Last years and death ===
Strunk became a folk hero in Maine and in 1970 narrowly lost the election for Senate seat in the state legislature. He was also a private pilot and purchased a 1941 Fairchild M62-A. On October 5, 1981, he suffered a heart attack just after take-off in the aircraft at Carrabassett Valley Airport, in Maine. The plane flipped over, falling some 300 ft (91 m), killing him instantly along with his passenger, Dick Ayotte, a long-time friend and local businessman. Strunk was 45 years old.

== Discography ==
=== Albums ===
Year	Album	Chart Positions			Label
Year	Album	US Country	US	AUS	Label
1970	Jud Strunk's Downeast Viewpoint	—	—	—	Columbia Records
1971	Jones' General Store	—	—	—	MGM Records
1973	Daisy a Day	18	138	25	MGM Records
1973	Mr. Bojangles And Other Favorites	—	—	—	Harmony
1977	A Semi-Reformed Tequila Crazed Gypsy Looks Back	—	—	—	MCA Records

=== Singles ===
Year	Title	Peak chart positions							Record Label	B-side	Album
Year	Title	US Country	US Pop	US AC	AUS	CAN Country	CAN Pop	CAN AC	Record Label	B-side	Album
1969	"The Santa Song (AKA Santa's Got A Moto-Ski)"	-	-	-	-	-	-	-	Rockland Recording Studio	"A Special Christmas Tree"	
1970	"Children at Play"	—	—	—	—	—	—	—	Columbia Records	"Self-Eating Watermelon"	Jud Strunk's Downeast Viewpoint
1971	"Bill Jones General Store"	—	—	—	—	—	—	—	CoBurt Records	"The Runaway"	Jones General Store
1972	"Daisy a Day"	33	14	4	1	18	3	5	MGM Records	"The Searchers"	Daisy a Day
1973	"Next Door Neighbor's Kid"	86	—	22	—	85	—	50	MGM Records	"I'd Prefer to Do It All Again"	Daisy a Day
1974	"My Country"	—	59	—	—	—	—	—	Capitol Records	"The Will"	
1975	"The Biggest Parakeets in Town"	51	50	—	68	20	71	—	Melodyland Records	"I Wasn't Wrong About You"	
1975	"Pamela Brown"	88	—	—	—	—	—	—	Melodyland Records	"They're Tearing Down a Town"	
