= Jerry Styner =

American songwriter, producer and musician (1936–2024)

- Born: Jerry Howard Styner; June 18, 1936; Los Angeles, California, U.S.
- Died: 2024 (aged 87–88)
- Other name: Rusty Howard
- Occupations: Songwriter; producer; musician

Jerry Howard Styner (June 18, 1936 – March 9, 2024) was an American songwriter, musician and record producer. He wrote scores for or had his compositions featured in over 30 films. Some of the artists he worked with included Chet Baker for his Blood, Chet and Tears album, and Solomon Burke for his We're Almost Home album.

For several years he served as a staff minister at the Center for Spiritual Living in Palm Desert, California.

== Career ==
In the late 1950s or early 1960s, Styner went under the name of Rusty Howard and was in a music group called the Rhythm Rangers. Along with lyricist Guy Hemric (1931–1993), they were a team that was prolific in writing for films during the 1960s. Many of these films were the B-grade type, including beach party films. The first film that Styner and Hemric wrote for was Beach Party in 1963. Hemric and Styner's songs for beach party films include "It Only Hurts When I Cry", performed in Beach Blanket Bingo by Donna Loren and released on Loren's 1965 LP of the same name along with seven other compositions by the songwriters. The song has become Loren's signature tune.

He also scored over 30 films over the years. These include Ski Party (1965), Thunder Alley (1967), The Savage Seven (1968), The Devil's 8 (1969), The Cycle Savages (1969), The Sidehackers (1969), Tick, Tick, Tick (1970), Corky (1972), The Genesis Children (1972), Cycle Psycho (1973), Mitchell (1975), and Dixie Dynamite (1976).

In the 1970s, along with Joe Porter and Kenny Myers, he produced the High Voltage album for singer Nick Anthony. That same year, he produced Chet Baker's Blood, Chet and Tears album. In 1972, he worked with Solomon Burke and Gene Page, co-producing Burke's 1972 single, "I Can't Stop Loving You".

== Later life and death ==
Styner later lived with his daughter in Guatemala. He died in on March 9, 2024.

== Discography ==
=== 78 RPM ===
As Rusty Howard

- Rusty Howard with the Rhythm Rangers - (1) "Hep Cat Baby", Rusty Howard with the Rhythm Rangers - (2) "Courtin' in the Rain" / Bob Sandy - (1) "This Is the Thanks I Get", Gayle Larson - (2) "You Can't Have My Love" - Tops R244X45-49
- Bob Sandy - (1) "If You Ain't Lovin'", Rusty Howard the Rhythm Rangers - (2) "I've Been Thinking" / Bob Sandy - (1) "Kisses Don't Lie", Rusty Howard the Rhythm Rangers - (2) "Loose Talk" - Tops R251-49
- Dick Turley - "Back Street Affair" / Rusty Howard - "Blackberry Boogie" - Tops – 343
- Rusty Howard with the Rhythm Rangers - "No Help Wanted" / Corky Carpenter with the Rhythm Rangers "The Death Of Hank Williams" - Tops 357

=== 45 RPM ===
As Jerry Styner

- "In the Middle of the Night" / "Lonely Little Girl" - Palomar 45-2206 / 45-2206V - (1965)

=== LP ===
- Jerry Styner and Michael Lloyd – The Devil's 8 (Original Motion Picture Soundtrack) Tower – ST-5160 - (1969)
- Jerry Styner and Larry Brown – Orbit III - Beverly Hills – BHS 38 - (1971)
- Great Balls of Fire by Mae West - (1972) - (recorded in 1968) - UK MGM:2315207. (The words on the LP's reverse say: "Strings and horns arranged by Jerry Styner. Engineered by Jerry Styner. Mastered at MGM Recording Studios, Val Valentin in charge". The Mike Curb Congregation supplied the vocal accompaniment.
