= Mrs. Miller =

American singer (1907–1997)

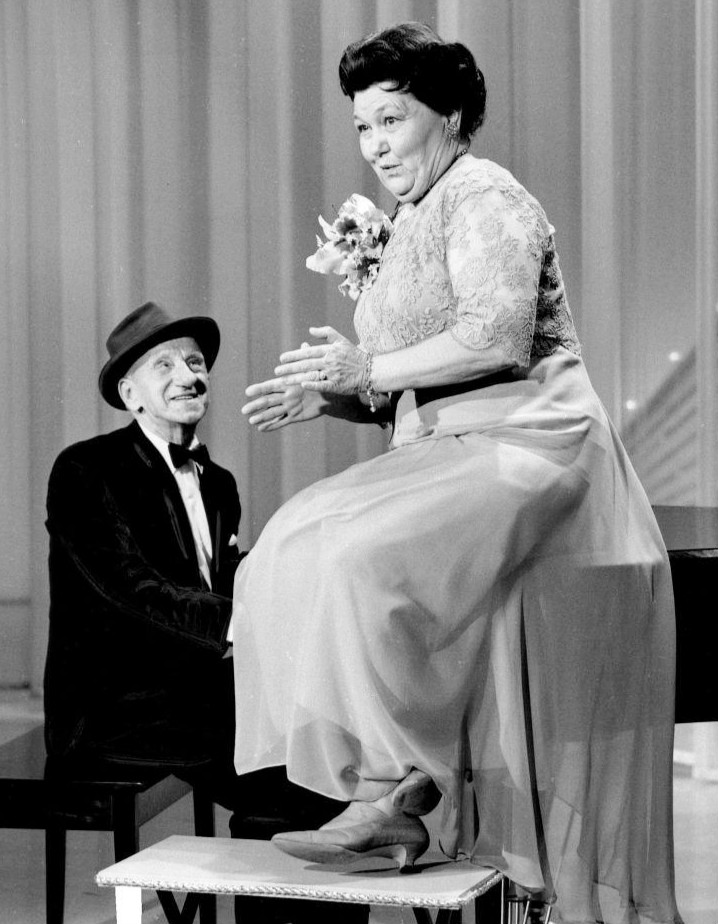
- Miller with Jimmy Durante during a 1966 appearance on The Hollywood Palace.
- Born: Elva Ruby Connes; October 5, 1907; Joplin, Missouri, U.S.
- Died: July 5, 1997 (aged 89); Vista, California, U.S.
- Resting place: Pomona Mausoleum, Pomona, California
- Spouse: John Richardson Miller (m. 1934; died 1968)

Elva Ruby Miller (October 5, 1907 – July 5, 1997) known professionally as Mrs. Miller, was an American singer who became a novelty figure in the 1960s for her unconventional interpretations of contemporary pop songs. An untrained mezzo-soprano, she performed with a pronounced vibrato and frequently deviated from standard pitch and tempo.

Miller's recording of "Downtown" entered the Billboard Hot 100 in April 1966, where it reached No. 82. Its B-side, "A Lover’s Concerto", also charted that month, peaking at No. 95.

== Life and career ==
Elva Ruby Connes was born in Joplin, Missouri, the third of seven children of Edward and Ada (née Martin) Connes. She spent her childhood in Missouri and Kansas.

On January 17, 1934, she married John Richardson Miller, a professional investor three decades her senior. The couple moved to Claremont, California the following year, where she studied music, voice, and composition at Pomona College and participated in church and community activities. Although she described singing as a hobby, Miller recorded several self-financed projects, including classical, gospel, and children's music. She produced at least one privately distributed 45 RPM single, "Slumber Song", which she shared with local orphanages.

Miller came to public attention when radio disc jockey Gary Owens featured her on his program in 1960 and later included her on a limited-run album of his comedy material. Arranger Fred Bock heard her recordings, encouraged her to attempt contemporary popular songs, and submitted the results to various record labels. In 1965, producer Lex de Azevedo signed her to Capitol Records.

Miller's commercial appeal was widely attributed to the unconventional and amateurish qualities of her singing, a characteristic also associated with performers such as Florence Foster Jenkins and Wing. Capitol Records highlighted this aspect of her work; in a 1967 Life magazine interview, Miller stated that during recording sessions she was sometimes conducted slightly ahead of or behind the beat, and that the released versions often used what she considered the worst takes.

Miller's debut album, Mrs. Miller’s Greatest Hits (1966), consisted entirely of contemporary popular standards and sold more than 250,000 copies within its first three weeks. Owens wrote the album's liner notes. Two additional Capitol albums followed: Will Success Spoil Mrs. Miller?! and The Country Soul of Mrs. Miller. She performed for American troops in Vietnam, appeared at the Hollywood Bowl, and made guest appearances on numerous television talk and variety shows. Miller also appeared in the 1967 film The Cool Ones, performing "It’s Magic".

As public interest declined, Capitol Records ended its association with Miller in 1968. She later released Mrs. Miller Does Her Thing on Amaret Records and issued several singles on her own label, Vibrato Records. She recorded two albums at Radio Recorders studios in Hollywood for Dunhill Records, though they received little attention. Her final known recording, a self-released EP, appeared in 1971.

Miller may have been the inspiration for a similar act called Mr. Miller and the Blue Notes, who released a version of the Herman's Hermits hit "Mrs. Brown, You've Got a Lovely Daughter" in 1966.

== Later years and death ==
Miller retired in 1973 and subsequently devoted much of her time to charitable work. She lived in a condominium in Northridge, Los Angeles until the 1994 Northridge earthquake, after which she relocated to a retirement home.

Miller died in 1997 at the Garden Terrace Retirement Center in Vista, California, at the age of 89. She was interred in the Pomona Mausoleum at Pomona Valley Memorial Park in Pomona, California.

In 1999, Capitol Records released a compilation of her recordings on its Ultra-Lounge label titled Wild, Cool & Swingin’: The Artist Collection, Volume Three.

== Discography ==
=== Albums ===
Album	Year	US charts
Mrs. Miller's Greatest Hits	1966	15
Will Success Spoil Mrs. Miller?!	1966	—
The Country Soul of Mrs. Miller	1967	—
Mrs. Miller Does Her Thing	1968	—
Wild, Cool & Swingin': The Artist Collection Volume Three	1999	—
The Turned-On World of Mrs. Miller	2000	—
A Christmas Gift from Mrs. Miller	2020	—

"—" did not chart

=== Charting singles ===
Single	Year	Billboard Hot 100	RPM 100
"Downtown"	1966	82	-
"A Lover's Concerto"	1966	95	53

== See also ==
- Leona Anderson
- Florence Foster Jenkins
- Tryphosa Bates-Batcheller
- William Hung
- William Topaz McGonagall
- William Shatner's musical career
- Jonathan and Darlene Edwards
