= Danny Doyle (singer) =

Irish folk singer (1940–2019)

- Born: 28 April 1940; Dublin, Ireland
- Died: 6 August 2019 (aged 79) Virginia, US
- Genre: Folk
- Occupation: Singer
- Spouse: Taffy

Daniel Doyle (28 April 1940 – 6 August 2019) was an Irish folk singer born in Dublin. During the 1960s and 1970s, he was one of the top Irish singers, regularly featuring in the Irish charts and scoring three No.1 singles. He recorded 25 albums and is known for his chart-topping songs "Whiskey on a Sunday", "A Daisy a Day", and "The Rare Auld Times".

== Biography ==
He was born in Dublin. After leaving school at the age of fourteen, Doyle started doing odd jobs, including working as general factotum in Dublin's Pike Theatre, where he began to pick up, from the travelling players, songs from the Irish countryside.

During the 1960s and 1970s, he was one of the top Irish singers, regularly featuring in the Irish charts and scoring three No. 1 singles. His song "The Rare Auld Times" notably displaced ABBA's "Take a Chance on Me" after just one week at the top. The song was composed in the 1970s by Pete St. John for the Dublin City Ramblers and peaked on the Irish Music Charts for 12 weeks. In 1979 Doyle was the first artist to record St John's song "The Fields of Athenry". He is probably best known for his 1967 number one hit "Whiskey on a Sunday". His other notable works are "A Daisy a Day" and "The Rare Auld Times". The hit songs "A Daisy A Day", "Streets Of London", "Lizzie Lindsay" and "Whiskey On A Sunday" that were released in the 1960s made him popular.

In 1980, he appeared on Thames Television's "Cooper's Half Hour" starring comedian Tommy Cooper. In 1983, he moved from Ireland to the United States. He appeared in concert throughout the world, including Carnegie Hall, New York and the Albert Hall, London. He collaborated with Bill Whelan who was a pianist, producer and Riverdance composer. Although retired from performing, he performed with other artists at the 2010 Milwaukee Irish Fest.

== Death ==
Doyle died on 6 August 2019 at the age of 79 at his residence in Virginia, in the United States. He is survived by his wife Taffy.

== Discography ==
=== Albums ===
- The Gatecrashers (1967)
- Expressions of Danny Doyle (1967)
- A Portrait of Danny Doyle (1969)
- The Hits of Danny Doyle
- Danny Doyle (LP)
- Danny Doyle Vol:2 (1975)
- A Very Special Love Song
- Born a Ramblin' Man (1976)
- Whiskey on a Sunday (1976)
- The West's Awake(1976)
- Harry Nilsson's the Point (1977)
- Presenting Danny Doyle (1977)
- Grand Old Irish Opry (1978)
- Raised on Songs and Stories (1980)
- The Highwayman (1981)
- Twenty Years A-Growing (1987)
- Dublin Me Darlin' (1990)
- Folk Masters Ensemble (1994)
- Under a Connemara Moon (1995)
- Spirit of the Gael (2002)
- Emigrant Eyes
- Step It Out
- Classic Collection
- St. Brendan's Fair Isle
- The Wearing of the Green

=== Selected singles ===
- "Step It Out Mary" / "Pretty Saro" (IE #4) December 1966
- "Irish Soldier Laddie" / "Morning Train" (IE #7) April 1967
- "Step It Out Mary" / "Sam Hall" / "Early Morning Rain" / "Red Haired Mary" EP, May 1967
- "Whiskey on a Sunday" / "Reason To Believe" (IE #1) September 1967
- "The Mucky Kid" / "Gone Away" (IE #17) March 1968
- "Johnny" / "Leaving on a Jet Plane" October 1968
- "The Long and Winding Road" June 1970
- "Take Me Home Country Roads" August 1971
- "The Green Hills of Kerry"
- "A Daisy a Day" / "Far Away in Australia" (IE #1) May 1973
- "Thanks for the Memories" / "Kentucky Moonshine" (IE #2) January 1974
- "A Very Special Love Song" / "Morning Bells Will Chime" (IE #11) July 1974
- "Jesus Is My Kind of People" / "Penny Annie" February 1975
- "Somewhere, Somebody's Waits" (IE #5) September 1976
- "The Rare Auld Times" (IE #1) January 1978
- "Old Dublin Town" / "Bells of the Morning" 1978
- "The Rare Auld Times" / "Old Dublin Town" (re-release) (IE #14) 1979

== Books ==
- The Gold Sun of Freedom (with Terence Folan) ISBN 9781856352086
