= 2004 Kerry Senior Football Championship =

Gaelic football competition

- Dates: 19
- Teams: 7 May - 18 December 2004
- Sponsor: Allied Irish Bank
- Champions: South Kerry (6th title); Maurice Fitzgerald (captain); James O'Sullivan (manager)
- Runners-up: Laune Rangers; Mike Frank Russell (captain); John Evans (manager)
- Relegated: John Mitchels

Tournament statistics
- Matches played: 25
- Goals scored: 49 (1.96 per match)
- Points scored: 509 (20.36 per match)
- Top scorer(s): Colm Cooper (3-21)

The 2004 Kerry Senior Football Championship was the 104th staging of the Kerry Senior Football Championship since its establishment by the Kerry County Board in 1889. The draw for the opening round fixtures took place on 25 March 2004. The championship ran from 7 May to 18 December 2004.

An Ghaeltacht entered the championship as the defending champions, however, they were beaten by Laune Rangers in the semi-finals.

The final was played on 7 November 2004 at FitzGerald Stadium in Killarney, between South Kerry and Laune Rangers in what was their first ever meeting in the final. South Kerry won the match by 1-13 to 2-05 to claim their sixth championship title overall and a first title in 22 years.

Colm Cooper was the championship's top scorer with 3-21.

== Results ==
=== Round 1 ===
7 May 2004 Round 1	Kerins O'Rahilly's	0-16 - 0-09	John Mitchels	Austin Stack Park
	D Quill 0-7, M Fitzgerald 0-4, J O'Connor 0-3, O Molloy 0-1, P Madden 0-1.		J Fitzgerald 0-4, A Moynihan 0-2, GD Dennehy 0-1, S O'Mahony 0-1, D Boylan 0-1.

8 May 2004 Round 1	St. Brendan's	2-06 - 1-11	Feale Rangers	Blennerville Grounds
	S Hayes 1-4, B Flaherty 1-1, S Wallace 0-1.		E Galvin 1-2, E Bowler 0-3, A O'Brien 0-2, M Kearney 0-1, P Somers 0-1, JJ Mulvihill 0-1, J Mulvihill 0-1.

8 May 2004 Round 1	Milltown/Castlemaine	0-13 - 2-03	Rathmore	Páirc de Búrca
	D Kelliher 0-8, S Murphy 0-2, G Wrenn 0-1, Martin Burke 0-1, D Twiss 0-1.		D Fitzgerald 1-1, T Cronin 1-0, M O'Riordan 0-2.

9 May 2004 Round 1	Kilcummin	1-07 - 1-08	Listowel Emmets	Kilcummin Grounds
	DJ Fleming 0-5, S Lenihan 1-0, R O'Connor 0-1, P O'Donoghue 0-1.		B Scanlon 1-3, N Kennelly 0-4, M Whelan 0-1.

9 May 2004 Round 1	Dr. Crokes	5-06 - 0-08	Austin Stacks	FitzGerald Stadium
	C Cooper 2-5, E Brosnan 2-0, M Crowley 1-0, D Moloney 0-1.		M Collins 0-3, B Sheehan 0-2, D Long 0-1, K Donaghy 0-1, P McCannon 0-1.

9 May 2004 Round 1	Shannon Rangers	1-11 - 3-11	Kenmare	Ballyongford Grounds
	E Mulvihill 1-2, B Bambury 0-5, S McGinley 0-2, J Holly 0-1, E Mangan 0-1.		J O'Sullivan 2-1, P O'Connor 0-5, B O'Connor 1-0, A O'Sullivan 0-3, S O'Leary 0-1, E O'Driscoll 0-1.

=== Round 2 ===
30 May 2004 Round 2	Austin Stacks	0-10 - 1-10	Kilcummin	Connolly Park
	M Collins 0-5, M Hogan 0-2, D Sayers 0-1, D Long 0-1, K Donaghy 0-1.		DJ Fleming 1-3, P O'Donoghue 0-5, M McCarthy 0-1, S Linehan 0-1.

30 May 2004 Round 2	Rathmore	0-14 - 0-08	John Mitchels	Rathbeg Grounds
	M O'Riordan 0-7, I Kelliher 0-2, I Buckley 0-1, O Doherty 0-1, D Fitzgerald 0-1, A O'Mahony 0-1B Nagle 0-1.		GD Dennehy 0-4, J Fitzgerald 0-1, O Coffey 0-1, O Kelliher 0-1, M Moloney 0-1.

30 May 2004 Round 2	Shannon Rangers	1-07 - 2-12	St. Brendan's	Ballylongford Grounds
	L Boyle 1-0, K Mulvihill 0-2, O Horgan 0-2, S McGinley 0-1, K Wrenn 0-1, J McMahon 0-1.		C Daly 1-3, S Wallace 1-1, S Hayes 0-4, B Poff 0-2, M O'Connor 0-1, R Barrett 0-1.

=== Relegation playoff ===
18 December 2004 Playoff	Austin Stacks	0-14 - 0-04	John Mitchels	Austin Stack Park
	D Long 0-4, M Hogan 0-3, M Collins 0-2, F Smith 0-2, P Hennebery 0-2, K Donaghy 0-1.		GD Dennehy 0-2, F O'Connor 0-1, R O'Sullivan 0-1.

=== Round 3 ===
18 June 2004 Round 3	Kenmare	0-09 - 0-07	Kilcummin	Kenmare Shamrocks
	P O'Connor 0-6, J O'Sullivan 0-2, A O'Sullivan 0-1.		J Linehan 0-3, B Brosnan 0-2, SB Doherty 0-1, L O'Leary 0-1.

19 June 2004 Round 3	St. Kieran's	1-09 - 0-08	Milltown/Castlemaine	Brosna Grounds
	K Lynch 0-5, J O'Donnell 1-0, J McGlynn 0-2, M Horgan 0-1, T McGoldrick 0-1.		G Wrenn 0-4, D Twiss 0-3, Mike Burke 0-1.

19 June 2004 Round 3	South Kerry	3-13 - 0-05	St. Brendan's	Blennerville Grounds
	R O'Connor 1-3, D O'Dwyer 1-2, A O'Sullivan 1-0, S Fogarty 0-3, B Sheehan 0-3, S Hussey 0-1, R Hussey 0-1.		S Hayes 0-2, S Wallace 0-1, C Daly 0-1, B Poff 0-1.

20 June 2004 Round 3	Dr Crokes	1-22 - 1-12	West Kerry	Lewis Road
	C Cooper 1-10, A O'Shea 0-5, K Brosnan 0-2, D Moloney 0-2, E Brosnan 0-1, D Cooper 0-1, R Neher 0-1.		D O'Sullivan 1-2, G Farrell 0-5, E Kennedy 0-2, J Brosnan 0-1, B Hannafin 0-1, N Sheehy 0-1.

20 June 2004 Round 3	Laune Rangers	1-12 - 1-10	East Kerry	J. P. O'Sullivan Park
	P O'Sullivan 0-4, J Lynch 1-0, MF Russell 0-3, B O'Shea 0-2, C O'Connor 0-2, B O'Sullivan 0-1.		R O'Donovan 0-5, D O'Connor 1-0, J Crowley 0-1, F McAuliffe 0-1, M Murphy 0-1, J Cronin 0-1, D Daly 0-1.

23 June 2004 Round 3	Kerins O'Rahilly's	0-10 - 1-07	An Ghaeltacht	Strand Road
	D Quill 0-6, J O'Connor 0-3, A Daly 0-1.		M Mac Gearailt 1-0, C Ó Dubhda 0-2, D Ó Cinnéide 0-2, T Ó Sé 0-1, D Ó Sé 0-1, R Ó Flatharta 0-1.

26 June 2004 Round 3	Rathmore	4-09 - 1-11	Feale Rangers	Rathbeg Grounds
	D Fitzgerald 0-7, J Buckley 2-0, I Kelleher 1-1, D O'Keeffe 1-0, K O'Keeffe 0-1.		P Galvin 1-4, J Mulvihill 0-2, E Bowler 0-2, S Lynch 0-2, M Kearney 0-1.

27 June 2004 Round 3	Mid Kerry	0-08 - 0-11	Listowel Emmets	Páirc na nGael
	D Doona 0-3, K Foley 0-2, S O'Sullivan 0-1, L Sheehan 0-1, J McGillycuddy 0-1.		N Kennelly 0-7, M Whelan 0-2, D Galvin 0-1, J Stack 0-1.

25 July 2004 Round 3 replay	An Ghaeltacht	2-08 - 0-10	Kerins O'Rahilly's	Gallarus Grounds
	D Ó Cinnéide 1-2, D Flaherty 1-0 (og), JJ Corduff 0-3, A Mac Gearailt 0-1, R Ó Flatharta 0-1, P Ó Cuinn 0-1.		D Quill 0-5, M Fitzgerald 0-2, B Moran 0-1, J O'Connor 0-1, O Molloy 0-1.

=== Quarter-finals ===
2 October 2004 Quarter-final	St. Kieran's	1-11 - 1-06	Kenmare	FitzGerald Stadium
	K Lynch 0-6, J Dennehy 1-1, T McGoldrick 0-1, J O'Donnell 0-1, M Horgan 0-1, F McAuliffe 0-1.		P O'Connor 1-4, S O'Shea 0-1, L Lynch 0-1.

9 October 2004 Quarter-final	An Ghaeltacht	1-11 - 1-09	Listowel Emmets	Austin Stack Park
	D Ó Cinnéide 1-4, C Ó Cruadhlaoich 0-2, M Mac Gearailt 0-2, T Ó Sé 0-1, M Ó Sé 0-1, C Ó Dubhda 0-1.		N Kennelly 0-6, B Scanlon 1-0, P Buckley 0-2, S Stack 0-1.

10 October 2004 Quarter-final	South Kerry	2-20 - 1-06	Rathmore	FitzGerald Stadium
	D O'Sullivan 1-2, R O'Connor 1-1, S Hussey 0-4, B Sheehan 0-4, A O'Sullivan 0-3, D O'Dwyer 0-2, S Fogarty 0-2, A O'Connell 0-1, B Hickey 0-1.		M O'Riordan 0-4, J Murphy 1-0, I Kelleher 0-1, A O'Mahony 0-1.

10 October 2004 Quarter-final	Laune Rangers	0-15 - 1-10	Dr. Crokes	FitzGerald Stadium
	P O'Sullivan 0-4, MF Russell 0-3, J Coffey 0-2, B O'Shea 0-2, S Foley 0-1, B Gannon 0-1, L Hassett 0-1, J Lynch 0-1.		C Cooper 0-6, A Kennelly 1-0, C Brosnan 0-1, M Moriarty 0-1, E Brosnan 0-1, J Fleming 0-1.

=== Semi-finals ===
24 October 2004 Semi-final	Laune Rangers	1-13 - 1-08	An Ghaeltacht	FitzGerald Stadium
	MF Russell 0-4, J Lynch 1-0, B Gannon 0-3, S Foley 0-2, P O'Sullivan 0-2, J Sheehan 0-1, C O'Connor 0-1.		D Ó Cinnéide 1-4, A Mac Gearailt 0-2, M Ó Sé 0-1, C Ó Cruadhlaoich 0-1.

24 October 2004 Semi-final	South Kerry	0-07 - 0-06	St. Kieran's	Austin Stack Park
	B Sheehan 0-3, M Fitzgerald 0-2, D O'Sullivan 0-2.		K Lynch 0-3, F McAuliffe 0-2, J Dennehy 0-1.

=== Final ===
7 November 2004 Final	South Kerry	1-13 - 2-05	Laune Rangers	FitzGerald Stadium
	B Sheehan 0-5 (0-3 frees); R O’Connor 1-1; D O’Sullivan 0-3; R Hussey 0-2 (0-1 free); D O’Dwyer and S Sugrue 0-1 each.		C O’Connor 1-1; S Foley 1-0; P O’Sullivan 0-2 frees; B Gannon and B O’Shea 0-1 each	Referee: P Sheehy (Clounmacon)

== Championship statistics ==
=== Top scorers ===
Overall

Rank	Player	Club	Tally	Total	Matches	Average
1	Colm Cooper	Dr. Crokes	3-21	30	3	10.00
2	Dara Ó Cinnéide	An Ghaeltacht	3-12	21	4	5.25
3	Paul O'Connor	Kenmare	1-15	18	3	6.00
3	Declan Quill	Kerins O'Rahilly's	0-18	18	3	6.00
5	Noel Kennelly	Listowel Emmets	0-17	17	3	5.66
6	Bryan Sheehan	South Kerry	0-15	15	4	3.75
7	Ronan O'Connor	South Kerry	0-14	14	4	3.50
8	Kevin Lynch	St. Kieran's	0-14	14	3	4.66
9	Seán Hayes	St. Brendan's	1-10	13	3	4.33
9	Michael O'Riordan	Rathmore	0-13	13	4	3.25

In a single game

Rank	Player	Club	Tally	Total	Opposition
1	Colm Cooper	Dr. Crokes	1-10	13	West Kerry
2	Colm Cooper	Dr. Crokes	2-05	11	Austin Stacks
3	Donal Kelliher	Milltown/Castlemaine	0-08	8	Rathmore
4	John O'Sullivan	Kenmare	2-01	7	Shannon Rangers
4	Seán Hayes	St. Brendan's	1-04	7	Feale Rangers
4	Paul Galvin	Feale Rangers	1-04	7	Rathmore
4	Paul O'Connor	Kenmare	1-04	7	St. Kieran's
4	Dara Ó Cinnéide	An Ghaeltacht	1-04	7	Listowel Emmets
4	Dara Ó Cinnéide	An Ghaeltacht	1-04	7	Laune Rangers
4	Declan Quill	Kerins O'Rahilly's	0-07	7	John Mitchels
4	Michael O'Riordan	Rathmore	0-07	7	John Mitchels
4	Damien Fitzgerald	Rathmore	0-07	7	Feale Rangers
4	Noel Kennelly	Listowel Emmets	0-07	7	Mid Kerry

=== Miscellaneous ===
- South Kerry won their first title since 1982.
- Laune Rangers became the first team to lose back-to-back finals since Austin Stacks in 1980-81.
- Milltown/Castlemaine played in the Munster Senior Club Football Championship after winning the Kerry Club Football Championship.
- Milltown/Castlemaine made their first appearance in the senior championship.
- Despite losing the Relegation Play-Off John Mitchels took their senior status.
