= Duagh GAA =

North Kerry Gaelic football team in County Kerry, Ireland

- CLG Dubháth
- Founded: 1891
- County: Kerry
- Colours
- Grounds: Duagh GAA Field
- Coordinates: 52°24′46″N 9°23′7″W

Playing kits
Standard colours

Duagh GAA is a Gaelic football and hurling club based in the village of Duagh in County Kerry. Founded in 1891 the club was a founder member of the North Kerry Football Board in 1924. Since then it has competed annually in the North Kerry Senior Football Championship, winning the championship on 6 occasions.

The club fields both boys and girls juvenile teams in football and senior men's teams in both football and hurling. It is a member club of the Feale Rangers divisional team that has competed in the Kerry Senior Football Championship.

Several Duagh players have represented Kerry, among them All-Ireland winners Tom Costelloe, Dan McAuliffe and Anthony Maher. Maher is the only Duagh player to win an All Star award.

Since 2025 the club has competed in the Kerry Premier Junior Football Championship.

== History ==
A GAA club was formed in the village of Duagh in 1891 shortly after the founding of the GAA in 1884. It was a founding member of the North Kerry Football Board in 1924 and competed in the Board's competitions annually. It wasn't until 1947 that the club reached the final of the North Kerry Senior Football Championship for the first time, losing to Ballylongford. Over the next 15 years however the club would contest 8 finals in all, winning 5 (in 1951, 1955, 1956, 1960, and 1962).

It would be another 40 years before Duagh reached the North Kerry final again, losing to Castleisland Desmonds in 2002. However they did win the Kerry Novice Championship that year, defeating Listry in the final. In 2006 Duagh won the Kerry Junior Football Championship for the first time with victory over Reenard and subsequently won the Munster Junior Club Football Championship defeating Adrigole of Cork in the final in Killarney. They reached the All-Ireland final but lost to Greencastle of Tyrone. Duagh reached the final of the North Kerry Championship again in 2008, but lost again, this time to Listowel Emmets.

In 2009 Duagh fielded their first ever senior hurling team to compete in the Kerry County Senior Hurling League.

Another football final was reached in 2011 (Kerry Junior Championship) and ended in another defeat. In 2012 Duagh bridged a 50 year gap winning the North Kerry Senior Football Championship for a 6th time defeating Beale after a replay. The club won a second Kerry Junior Football Championship in 2024 with a final victory over Tarbert.

== Honours ==
- Munster Junior Club Football Championship (1): 2006
- Kerry Junior Football Championship (2): 2006, 2024
- Kerry Novice Championship (1): 2002
- North Kerry Senior Football Championship (6): 1951, 1955, 1956, 1960, 1962, 2012

== Notable players ==
- Tom Costelloe
- Anthony Maher
- Dan McAuliffe
- Kieran Quirke

== See also ==
- North Kerry GAA
