= 1999 Kerry Senior Football Championship =

Gaelic football competition

- Dates: 13 June - 24 October 1999
- Teams: 18
- Sponsor: Allied Irish Bank
- Champions: East Kerry (7th title); John Crowley (captain)
- Runners-up: Feale Rangers; Eamon Breen (captain)

Tournament statistics
- Matches played: 18
- Goals scored: 31 (1.72 per match)
- Points scored: 364 (20.22 per match)
- Top scorer(s): Tadhg Kennelly (2-17)

The 1999 Kerry Senior Football Championship was the 99th staging of the Kerry Senior Football Championship since its establishment by the Kerry County Board in 1889. The draw for the opening round fixtures took place on 20 April 1999. The championship ran from 13 June to 24 October 1999.

East Kerry entered the championship as the defending champions in search of a third successive title. An Ghaeltacht made their first ever appearance in the championship.

The final was played on 24 October 1999 at Austin Stack Park in Tralee, between East Kerry and Feale Rangers, in what was their first ever meeting in the final. East Kerry won the match by 0-10 to 1-06 to claim their seventh championship title overall and a third title in succession.

Feale Rangers' Tadhg Kennelly was the championship's top scorer with 2-17.

== Results ==
=== Preliminary round ===
13 June 1999 Preliminary round	Kenmare	1-06 - 1-13	Dr Crokes	Fr. Breen Park
	J O'Sullivan 1-0, B O'Neill 0-2, J O'Neill 0-2, J Moriarty 0-1, K Moriarty 0-1.		R Neher 0-6, P O'Shea 1-0, D Moloney 0-3, E Brosnan 0-2, J Fleming 0-2.

13 June 1999 Preliminary round	John Mitchels	1-06 - 1-10	Mid Kerry	Austin Stack Park
	F O'Brien 1-2, E Kelliher 0-2, A Moynihan 0-1, P Locke 0-1.		K Foley 1-3, I Twiss 0-4, J Daly 0-2, S O'Sullivan 0-1.

=== Round 1 ===
25 June 1999 Round 1	Shannon Rangers	1-05 - 2-13	Laune Rangers	Tarbert Grounds
	B Bambury 1-1, E Hennessy 0-2, C Lyons 0-1, E O'Connell 0-1.		P Griffin 1-3, P O'Sullivan 0-5, L Hassett 1-1, MF Russell 0-3, M Hassett 0-1.

26 June 1999 Round 1	St. Brendan's	1-08 - 0-08	Killarney Legion	Ardfert Grounds
	G McGillyciddy 1-0, C O'Grady 0-3, E Murphy 0-1, MB O'Donoghue 0-1, S Culloty 0-1, D Culloty 0-1, J Culloty 0-1.		G Hussey 0-2, R Barrett 0-2, O O'Connor 0-1, J Enright 0-1, E Ryle 0-1, D Wallace 0-1.

27 June 1999 Round 1	Feale Rangers	3-06 - 1-09	Austin Stacks	Frank Sheehy Park
	T Kennelly 1-1, J Mulvihill 1-0, A Doran 1-0, N Kennelly 0-3, B Scanlon 0-1, M Kearney 0-1.		M Collins 1-0, M Hogan 0-2, B Sheehan 0-2, D Long 0-2, P Laide 0-1, K Kelleher 0-1, D McEvoy 0-1.

2 July 1999 Round 1	Castleisland Dersmonds	2-10 - 1-08	Kilcummin	Castleisland Grounds
	K Lynch 0-6, D Buckley 1-1, K O'Sullivan 1-0, B McMahon 0-1, S Curtin 0-1, N Dillon 0-1.		E O'Donoghue 1-1, DJ Fleming 0-3, W Maher 0-1, P O'Donoghue 0-1, S O'Leary 0-1, T Brosnan 0-1.

4 July 1999 Round 1	Dr Crokes	0-09 - 0-06	West Kerry	FitzGerald Stadium
	P O'Shea 0-3, B Clarke 0-2, N O'Leary 0-2, M Cooper 0-1, V Casey 0-1.		B Hannafin 0-2, G Farrell 0-2, M Moriarty 0-1, T Griffin 0-1.

30 July 1999 Round 1	St Kierans	0-15 - 0-09	Kerins O'Rahilly's	Scrataglin Grounds
	J McGlynn 0-6, S McElligott 0-3, P Dennehy 0-2, DD O'Rahilly 0-1, G O'Keeffe 0-1, EJ O'Donoghue 0-1, T O'Connor 0-1.		D Quill 0-4, V Murphy 0-3, O Molloy 0-1, M Fitzgerald 0-1.

1 August 1999 Round 1	East Kerry	1-13 - 0-10	Mid Kerry	FitzGerald Stadium
	S Flynn 1-1, J Crowley 0-4, D Daly 0-3, S Óg O'Leary 0-2, G Murphy 0-2, S Moynihan 0-1.		I Twiss 0-4, I O'Shea 0-2, M Burke 0-1, V O'Donoghue 0-1, G O'Connor 0-1, K O'Connor 0-1.

1 August 1999 Round 1	South Kerry	0-15 - 1-12	An Ghaeltacht	Waterville Grounds
	M Fitzgerald 0-5, B O'Connor 0-3, J Clifford 0-2, J Quirke 0-1, S Hussey 0-1, JD O'Shea 0-1, J O'Shea 0-1, K Burns 0-1.		D Ó Cinnéide 1-5, A Mac Gearailt 0-3, C Ó Dubhda 0-2, T Ó Conchúir 0-2.

21 August 1999 Round 1 replay	An Ghaeltacht	1-13 - 1-08	South Kerry	Gallarus Grounds
	D Ó Cinnéide 1-5, R Mac Gearailt 0-3, C Ó Dubhda 0-2, T Ó Sé 0-1, T Ó Conchúir 0-1, A Mac Gearailt 0-1.		B O'Shea 1-1, J Shanahan 0-2, D O'Dwyer 0-2, K Burns 0-2, M Fitzgerald 0-1.

=== Quarter-finals ===
22 August 1999 Quarter-final	Feale Rangers	2-22 - 0-07	Killarney Legion	Castleisland Grounds
	T Kennelly 1-10, P Galvin 1-2, B Scanlon 0-3, J Corridan 0-2, E Galvin 0-2, S Stack 0-1, E Breen 0-1, A Doran 0-1.		D Culloty 0-5, C O'Grady 0-1, J McGillicuddy 0-1.

27 August 1999 Quarter-final	Dr Crokes	1-10 - 0-10	Castleisland Desmonds	Austin Stack Park
	P O'Shea 1-3, B Clarke 0-3, R Neher 0-2, E Brosnan 0-1, V Casey 0-1.		J Brennan 0-5, S Curtin 0-2, C O'Sullivan 0-1, B McMahon 0-1, T Broderick 0-1.

4 September 1999 Quarter-final	Laune Rangers	2-16 - 0-10	St. Kieran's	FitzGerald Stadium
	B Gannon 1-1, P Griffin 0-4, B O'Shea 1-0, P O'Sullivan 0-3, MF Russell 0-2, B Fitzgerald 0-2, L Hassett 0-2, M Hassett 0-1, T Byrne 0-1.		J McGlynn 0-2, DD O'Rahilly 0-2, G O'Keeffe 0-2, S McElligott 0-1, J Dennehy 0-1, T O'Connor 0-1, D Dennehy 0-1.

5 September 1999 Quarter-final	East Kerry	3-12 - 0-08	An Ghaeltacht	Austin Stack Park
	J Crowley 2-5, J Murphy 1-3, L Murphy 0-3, S Moynihan 0-1.		D Ó Cinnéide 0-3, T Ó Conchúir 0-2, C Ó Dubhda 0-2, R Mac Gearailt 0-1.

=== Semi-finals ===
12 September 1999 Semi-final	East Kerry	0-15 - 1-09	Dr. Crokes	FitzGerald Stadium
	P O'Donoghue 0-3, D Daly 0-2, J Crowley 0-2, M O'Donoghue 0-1, J Murphy 0-1, S Óg O'Leary 0-1, MD Cahill 0-1, A Morris 0-1, L Murphy 0-1, J O'Sullivan 0-1, S Moynihan 0-1.		B Clarke 1-3, D Moloney 0-3, P O'Shea 0-2, R Neher 0-1.

19 September 1999 Semi-final	Feale Rangers	2-08 - 0-09	Laune Rangers	Austin Stack Park
	N Kennelly 2-1, T Kennelly 0-3, B Scanlon 0-2, J Corridan 0-1, A Doran 0-1.		P O'Sullivan 0-6, L Hassett 0-2, J O'Shea 0-1.

=== Final ===
24 October 1999 Final	East Kerry	0-10 - 1-06	Feale Rangers	Austin Stack Park
	P O'Donoghue 0-5, D Daly 0-2, L Murphy 0-2, MD Cahill 0-1.		J Corridan 1-0, T Kennelly 0-3, B Scanlon 0-1, P Galvin 0-1, N Kennelly 0-1.	Referee: T Gilligan (Valentia)

== Championship statistics ==
=== Top scorers ===
Overall

Rank	Player	Club	Tally	Total	Matches	Average
1	Tadhg Kennelly	Feale Rangers	2-17	23	4	5.75
2	Dara Ó Cinnéide	An Ghaeltacht	2-13	19	3	6.33
3	John Crowley	East Kerry	2-11	17	4	4.25
4	Pat O'Shea	Dr. Crokes	2-08	14	4	3.50
4	Pa O'Sullivan	Laune Rangers	0-14	14	3	4.66
6	Noel Kennelly	Feale Rangers	2-05	11	4	2.75
6	Brian Clarke	Dr. Crokes	1-08	11	4	2.75
8	Paul Griffin	Laune Rangers	1-07	10	3	3.33
9	Roland Neher	Dr. Crokes	0-09	9	4	2.25
10	Liam Hassett	Laune Rangers	1-05	8	3	2.66
10	John McGlynn	St. Kieran's	0-08	8	2	4.00
10	Paud O'Donoghue	East Kerry	0-08	8	2	4.00
10	Ian Twiss	Mid Kerry	0-08	8	2	4.00

In a single game

Rank	Player	Club	Tally	Total	Opposition
1	Tadhg Kennelly	Feale Rangers	1-10	13	Killarney Legion
2	John Crowley	East Kerry	2-05	11	An Ghaeltacht
3	Dara Ó Cinnéide	An Ghaeltacht	1-05	8	South Kerry
3	Dara Ó Cinnéide	An Ghaeltacht	1-05	8	South Kerry
5	Noel Kennelly	Feale Rangers	2-01	7	Laune Rangers
6	Kieran Foley	Mid Kerry	1-03	6	John Mitchels
6	Paul Griffin	Laune Rangers	1-03	6	Shannon Rangers
6	Pat O'Shea	Dr. Crokes	1-03	6	Desmonds
6	Jerry Murphy	East Kerry	1-03	6	An Ghaeltacht
6	Brian Clarke	Dr. Crokes	1-03	6	East Kerry
6	Roland Neher	Dr. Crokes	0-06	6	Kenmare
6	Kevin Lynch	Desmonds	0-06	6	Kilcummin
6	John McGlynn	St. Kieran's	0-06	6	Kerins O'Rahilly's
6	Pa O'Sullivan	Laune Rangers	0-06	6	Feale Rangers

=== Miscellaneous ===
- East Kerry became the first side since themselves in 1970 to win three titles in-a-row.
- Feale Rangers qualified for the final for the first time since 1985.
