= Dan McAuliffe =

Irish Gaelic football player (1933–1999)

Personal information
- Native name: Dónall Mac Amhlaoibh (Irish)
- Born: 1933 Duagh, County Kerry, Ireland
- Died: 9 March 1999 (aged 65) Tralee, County Kerry, Ireland
- Occupation: Publican
- Height: 5 ft 10 in (178 cm)

Sport
- Sport: Gaelic football
- Position: Right wing-forward
Clubs
- Years: Club
- Duagh; Feale Rangers; Shannon Rangers
Club titles
- Kerry titles: 1
Inter-county
Years	County	Apps (scores)
1955–1964	Kerry	21 (5-39)
Inter-county titles
- Munster titles: 7
- All-Irelands: 3
- NFL: 2

Daniel McAuliffe (1933 – 9 March 1999) was an Irish Gaelic footballer. He played at club level with Duagh, Feale Rangers and Shannon Rangers and at inter-county level with the Kerry senior football team.

== Career ==
Born in Duagh, County Kerry, McAuliffe first came to prominence as a member of the local club. He made his first appearances at inter-county level as a member of the Kerry minor team that won the Munster Minor Championship title in 1951. A spell with the Kerry junior team yielded an All-Ireland Junior Championship medal in 1954, before McAuliffe was drafted onto the Kerry senior team the following year. He won his first All-Ireland Championship title as a non-playing substitute in his debut season, before claiming two further winners' medals on the field of play in 1959 and 1962. McAuliffe also won six Munster Championship titles and was involved in two National League title-winning teams. Following the conclusion of his inter-county career, he enjoyed success at club level by winning a County Championship title as captain of Shannon Rangers in 1964.

== Personal life and death ==
McAuliffe spent his working life as a publican and owner of a scaffolding business in his native Duagh. He died aged 65 at the Bon Secours Hospital in Tralee on 9 March 1999, after battling illness for the previous seven years.

== Career statistics ==
Team	Season	National League			Munster		All-Ireland		Total	
Team	Season	Division	Apps	Score	Apps	Score	Apps	Score	Apps	Score
Kerry	1954–55	Division 1	0	0-00	1	0-01	1	0-01	2	0-02
Kerry	1955–56	Division 1	4	1-03	2	0-01	—		6	1-04
Kerry	1956–57	Division 1	3	0-02	1	0-01	—		4	0-03
Kerry	1957–58	Division 1	3	0-01	1	0-01	0	0-00	4	0-02
Kerry	1958–59	Division 1	7	0-22	2	1-11	2	3-06	11	4-39
Kerry	1959–60	Division 1	7	2-19	1	0-01	1	0-00	9	2-20
Kerry	1960–61	Division 1	7	3-15	3	0-09	1	0-01	11	3-25
Kerry	1961–62	Division 1	3	2-08	2	1-06	2	0-00	7	3-14
Kerry	1962–63	Division 1	0	0-00	0	0-00	0	0-00	0	0-00
Kerry	1963–64	Division 1	0	0-00	0	0-00	1	0-00	1	0-00
Career total			34	8-70	14	2-31	7	3-08	55	13-109

== Honours ==
Shannon Rangers

- Kerry Senior Football Championship: 1964 (c)

Kerry

- All-Ireland Senior Football Championship: 1955, 1959, 1962
- Munster Senior Football Championship: 1955, 1958, 1959, 1960, 1961, 1962, 1964
- National Football League: 1958–59, 1960–61
- All-Ireland Junior Football Championship: 1954
- Munster Junior Football Championship: 1954
- Munster Minor Football Championship: 1951
