= 2007 Kerry Senior Football Championship =

Gaelic football competition

- Dates: 12 May - 11 November 2007
- Teams: 21
- Sponsor: Allied Irish Bank
- Champions: Feale Rangers (3rd title); Éamonn Fitzmaurice (captain); Johnny Mulvihill (manager)
- Runners-up: South Kerry; Bryan Hickey (captain); Pat McCrohan (manager)
- Relegated: Milltown/Castlemaine

Tournament statistics
- Matches played: 39
- Goals scored: 60 (1.54 per match)
- Points scored: 806 (20.67 per match)
- Top scorer(s): D. J. Fleming (0-41)

The 2007 Kerry Senior Football Championship was the 107th staging of the Kerry Senior Football Championship since its establishment by the Kerry County Board in 1889. The draw for the opening round fixtures took place on 28 March 2007. The championship ran from 12 May to 11 November 2007.

South Kerry entered the championship as the defending champions in search of a fourth successive title.

The final was played on 11 November 2007 at Austin Stack Park in Tralee, between Feale Eangers and South Kerry in what was their second meeting in the final and a first in 25 years. Feale Rangers won the match by 1-04 to 0-06 to claim their third championship title overall and a first title in 27 years.

Kilcummin's D. J. Fleming was the championship's top scorer with 0-41.

== Team changes ==
=== To Championship ===
Promoted from the Kerry Intermediate Football Championship

- Ardfert

=== From Championship ===
Relegated to the Kerry Intermediate Football Championship

- John Mitchels

== Results ==
=== Round 1 ===
| 12 May 2007 Round 1 | St. Brendan's | 1-14 - 3-06 | St. Kieran's | Lerrig Grounds |
| | E O'Neill 1-1, L O'Sullivan 0-4, D O'Callaghan 0-4, C Daly 0-4, S Brosnan 0-1. | | J Brennan 1-0, K Brennan 1-0, S Flynn 1-0, T O'Connor 0-3, D Walsh 0-1, T McGoldrick 0-1, S Scanlon 0-1. |

| 12 May 2007 Round 1 | Rathmore | 0-10 - 0-15 | An Ghaeltacht | Rathbeg Grounds |
| | MA Kelleher 0-2, J Murphy 0-2, M O'Riordan 0-2, D Casey 0-2, J Buckley 0-1, I Kelleher 0-1. | | D Ó Cinnéide 0-5, T Ó Conchúir 0-2, A Mac Gearailt 0-2, SM Ó Conchúir 0-2, R Mac Gearailt 0-1, M Ó Sé 0-1, C Mac Gearailt 0-1, E Mac Gearailt 0-1. |

| 12 May 2007 Round 1 | Ardfert | 3-05 - 1-10 | Killarney Legion | Lerrig Grounds |
| | S Wallace 1-1, S Griffin 1-0, Darren Wallace 1-0, J Egan 0-3, E Ferris 0-1. | | J O'Donoghue 1-4, M O'Sullivan 0-3, J Bowler 0-1, J Cronin 0-1, D Murphy 0-1. |

| 13 May 2007 Round 1 | Milltown/Castlemaine | 0-13 - 0-15 | Kerins O'Rahilly's | Páirc de Búrca |
| | D Twiss 0-4, D Kelliher 0-2, I Twiss 0-2, C Kerins 0-1, F Murphy 0-1, S Murphy 0-1, J Hayes 0-1, A Giles 0-1. | | D Quill 0-6, J O'Connor 0-4, T O'Sullivan 0-2, R Molloy 0-1, D Moran 0-1, T Walsh 0-1. |

| 13 May 2007 Round 1 | Mid Kerry | 2-12 - 1-07 | Feale Rangers | J. P. O'Sullivan Park |
| | L Sheehan 0-4, D Walsh 1-1, S Caulfield 1-0, S O'Sullivan 0-2, R O'Connor 0-1, K O'Brien 0-1, G Sayers 0-1, A O'Shea 0-1. | | N Kennelly 0-4, E Fitzmaurice 1-0, S Curtin 0-2, D Galvin 0-1. |

| 13 May 2007 Round 1 | Austin Stacks | 1-09 - 0-09 | Kilcummin | Austin Stack Park |
| | M Collins 1-1, G O'Connell 0-3, D Long 0-2, D Bohane 0-2, M Courtney 0-1. | | DJ Fleming 0-7, K Gorman 0-1, P O'Donoghue 0-1. |

| 13 May 2007 Round 1 | Shannon Rangers | 0-08 - 0-17 | East Kerry | Ballylongford Grounds |
| | K Mulvihill 0-3, G O'Grady 0-1, B Browne 0-1, J King 0-1, B O'Grady 0-1, P Kennelly 0-1. | | M O'Donoghue 0-4, J Falvey 0-4, DJ O'Connor 0-4, JP Brosnan 0-3, S Dennehy 0-1, D Daly 0-1. |

| 13 May 2007 Round 1 | Dr. Crokes | 0-16 - 0-07 | Dingle | FitzGerald Stadium |
| | C Cooper 0-4, D Moloney 0-3, B Looney 0-3, K O'Leary 0-2, B Moriarty 0-1, L Quinn 0-1, A O'Donovan 0-1, J Doolan 0-1. | | A O'Neill 0-2, D Geaney 0-2, D Ryan 0-2, L Higgins 0-1. |

| 13 May 2007 Round 1 | Laune Rangers | 2-21 - 1-09 | John Mitchels | J. P. O'Sullivan Park |
| | MF Russell 2-5, P O'Sullivan 0-5, L Hassett 0-4, J Sheehan 0-2, C Kelly 0-2, J Carey 0-1, S Foley 0-1, K Flynn 0-1. | | A O'Donoghue 0-6, C O'Sullivan 1-0, E Kelliher 0-1, A Moynihan 0-1, D Boylan 0-1. |

| 13 May 2007 Round 1 | West Kerry | 0-09 - 2-05 | Kenmare | Paddy Kennedy Memorial Park |
| | D O'Sullivan 0-3, S Hussey 0-2, E Kennedy 0-1, B Hanafin 0-1, A McNamara 0-1, S Browne 0-1. | | P O'Connor 1-2, JJ Brosnan 1-0, L O'Shea 0-1, S O'Leary 0-1, S Hussey 0-1. |

- South Kerry received a bye to Round 3.

=== Round 2 ===
| 19 May 2007 Round 2 | Feale Rangers | 2-12 - 0-08 | St. Kieran's | Frank Sheehy Park |
| | N Kennelly 1-7, P Curtin 1-0, E Fitzmaurice 0-2, B O'Connell 0-1, B Scanlon 0-1, E Galvin 0-1. | | T O'Connor 0-5, M O'Connell 0-2, K Brennan 0-1. |

| 19 May 2007 Round 2 | Shannon Rangers | 1-13 - 2-05 | West Kerry | Paddy Kennedy Memorial Park |
| | B O'Grady 1-8, O Horgan 0-2, P Kennelly 0-1, P O'Connell 0-1, E Walsh 0-1. | | D O'Sullivan 1-1, E Kennedy 1-1, G O'Connor 0-2, S Browne 0-1. |

| 20 May 2007 Round 2 | Milltown/Castlemaine | 0-14 - 2-08 | Dingle | Páirc de Búrca |
| | D Twiss 0-8, O Boyle 0-2, S Murphy 0-2, C Kelliher 0-1, D Kelliher 0-1. | | D Devane 1-4, D Geaney 1-2, M Geaney 0-1, L Óg Higgins 0-1. |

| 20 May 2007 Round 2 | Rathmore | 0-10 - 0-12 | Kilcummin | Rathbeg Grounds |
| | D Casey 0-4, M O'Riordan 0-2, I Kelliher 0-1, D O'Sullivan 0-1, M Lawlor 0-1, J Murphy 0-1. | | DJ Fleming 0-7, SB O'Doherty 0-1, R O'Connor 0-1, J Devane 0-1, D Brosnan 0-1, M O'Connor 0-1. |

| 20 May 2007 Round 2 | Killarney Legion | 0-16 - 1-06 | John Mitchels | FitzGerald Stadium |
| | J O'Donoghue 0-6, D Murphy 0-4, M O'Sullivan 0-3, D Pyne 0-1, J Bowler 0-1, A O'Leary 0-1. | | A Moynihan 1-0, A O'Donoghue 0-2, P Kelly 0-1, S O'Mahony 0-1, S McMahon 0-1, D Ginty 0-1. |

| 27 May 2007 Round 2 replay | Dingle | 1-10 - 1-05 | Milltown/Castlemaine | Páirc an Aghasaigh |
| | B Kelliher 1-2, D Devane 0-3, L Óg Higgins 0-2, P Quaid 0-1, T Griffin 0-1, D Geaney 0-1. | | S Murphy 1-0, D Twiss 0-3, I Twiss 0-2. |

=== Relegation playoff ===
| 10 June 2007 Playoff | Rathmore | 1-18 - 0-09 | John Mitchels | FitzGerald Stadium |
| | M O'Riordan 0-6, J Murphy 0-6, P Reen 1-0, E Lawlor 0-2, MA Kelliher 0-1. | | A O'Donoghue 0-5, J Higgins 0-1, E Kelliher 0-1, C O'Sullivan 0-1, D Flahive 0-1. |

| 15 July 2007 Playoff | John Mitchels | 0-09 - 0-09 | Milltown/Castlemaine | Kilcummin Grounds |
| | A O'Donoghue 0-3, E Kelliher 0-2, R O'Sullivan 0-2, J Higgins 0-1, D Flahive 0-1. | | D Twiss 0-5, K McKenna 0-2, J Flynn 0-1, O Boyle 0-1. |

| 23 September 2007 Playoff replay | John Mitchels | 1-12 - 0-11 (aet) | Milltown/Castlemaine | Castleisland Grounds |
| | B Costello 1-4, A Moynihan 0-5, P Kelly 0-2, S O'Mahony 0-1. | | D Kelliher 0-2, I Twiss 0-2, C McKenna 0-2, D Twiss 0-1, Kevin McKenna 0-1, Jamie O'Shea 0-1, O Boyle 0-1, K O'Shea 0-1. |

=== Round 3 ===
| 9 June 2007 Round 3 | Austin Stacks | 0-08 - 0-10 | East Kerry | Austin Stack Park |
| | G O'Connell 0-5, M Collins 0-2, J O'Connor 0-1. | | MS O'Donoghue 0-3, J Falvey 0-2, Donie O'Connor 0-2, JP Brosnan 0-2, D Daly 0-1. |

| 9 June 2007 Round 3 | Dingle | 0-06 - 1-15 | South Kerry | Páirc an Aghasaigh |
| | D Devane 0-2, M Kennedy 0-2, T Garvey 0-1, D Geaney 0-1. | | R O'Connor 1-2, B Sheehan 0-4, R Hussey 0-3, P Curran 0-3, A O'Sullivan 0-2, Denis O'Sullivan 0-1. |

| 10 June 2007 Round 3 | Laune Rangers | 2-08 - 1-11 | Mid Kerry | J. P. O'Sullivan Park |
| | P O'Sullivan 1-3, K Flynn 1-0, MF Russell 0-3, S Foley 0-2. | | L Sheehan 1-3, A O'Shea 0-2, S O'Sullivan 0-2, D O'Sullivan 0-1, F Griffin 0-1, G Sayers 0-1, F Griffin 0-1. |

| 10 June 2007 Round 3 | Shannon Rangers | 1-07 - 4-15 | An Ghaeltacht | Grank Sheehy Park |
| | P Kennedy 1-2, R O'Sullivan 0-1, O Horgan 0-1, E Walsh 0-1, M O'Mahony 0-1, KK Mulvihill 0-1. | | A Mac Gearailt 2-0, T Ó Conchúir 1-1, D Ó Cinnéide 0-4, Mícheál Ó Sé 1-0, R Ó Flaharta 0-2, SM Ó Conchúir 0-2, E Mac Gearailt 0-2, M Mac Gearailt 0-1, Darragh Ó Sé 0-1, R Mac Gearailt 0-1, T Ó Cíobháin 0-1. |

| 10 June 2007 Round 3 | Feale Rangers | 0-13 - 2-04 | Ardfert | Grank Sheehy Park |
| | N Kennelly 0-5, S McCarthy 0-2, Pa Curtin 0-2, E Fitzmaurice 0-1, P Galvin 0-1, D Griffin 0-1, B Scanlon 0-1. | | C Wallace 1-0, M Moloney 1-0, Damien Wallace 0-2, J Egan 0-1, E Ferris 0-1. |

| 10 June 2007 Round 3 | Kerins O'Rahilly's | 2-14 - 1-03 | St. Brendan's | Austin Stack Park |
| | D Flaherty 1-3, BJ Walsh 1-0, D Moran 0-3, D Quill 0-2, T Walsh 0-2, J O'Connor 0-2, T O'Sullivan 0-1, B Fitzgerald 0-1. | | L O'Sullivan 1-2, E O'Neill 0-1. |

| 10 June 2007 Round 3 | Killarney Legion | 0-09 - 1-16 | Dr. Crokes | FitzGerald Stadium |
| | J O'Donoghue 0-5, M O'Sullivan 0-2, J Bowler 0-1, S Culloty 0-1. | | B Looney 0-5, C Cooper 0-5, D Moloney 1-0, K O'Leary 0-2, J Fleming 0-1, J Buckley 0-1, J Doolin 0-1, M Grady 0-1. |

| 10 June 2007 Round 3 | Kenmare | 1-11 - 0-16 | Kilcummin | Templenoe Grounds |
| | P O'Connor 0-5, M McNally 1-1, L O'Shea 0-3, S Hussey 0-1, MT O'Sullivan 0-1. | | DJ Fleming 0-10, M O'Connor 0-2, K Gorman 0-1, B Brosnan 0-1, D Brosnan 0-1, SB Doherty 0-1. |

| 8 July 2007 Round 3 replay | Laune Rangers | 1-13 - 1-15 | Mid Kerry | J. P. O'Sullivan Park |
| | MF Russell 1-4, P O'Sullivan 0-4, K Flynn 0-2, L Hassett 0-2, T McGillycuddy 0-1. | | A O'Shea 1-1, L Sheehan 0-4, D O'Sullivan 0-3, S O'Sullivan 0-3, D Walsh 0-1, A O'Connor 0-1, G Sayers 0-1, K Foley 0-1. |

=== Quarter-finals ===
| 14 July 2007 Quarter-final | South Kerry | 1-16 - 1-10 | Dr. Crokes | J. P. O'Sullivan Park |
| | B Sheehan 0-5, A O'Sullivan 1-1, R Hussey 0-4, R O'Connor 0-2, Declan O'Sullivan 0-2, S Fogarty 0-2. | | C Cooper 1-5, K O'Leary 0-2, J Fleming 0-1, A O'Donovan 0-1, E Brosnan 0-1. |

| 15 July 2007 Quarter-final | Mid Kerry | 2-06 - 1-09 | Kerins O'Rahilly's | Austin Stack Park |
| | K Foley 1-0, S O'Sullivan 1-0, Darran O'Sullivan 0-2, A Cahillane 0-1, J McGillicuddy 0-1, A O'Shea 0-1, L Sheehan 0-1. | | D Moran 1-1, M O'Sullivan 0-2, BJ Walsh 0-1, J O'Connor 0-1, T O'Sullivan 0-1, T Walsh 0-1, D Flaherty 0-1, D Quill 0-1. |

| 15 July 2007 Quarter-final | Feale Rangers | 0-10 - 1-06 | An Ghaeltacht | Austin Stack Park |
| | N Kennelly 0-5, S McCarthy 0-2, E Fitzmaurice 0-1, E Galvin 0-1, S McCarthy 0-1. | | D Ó Cinnéide 1-2, D Mac Gearailt 0-2, S Ó Conchúir 0-1, T Ó Sé 0-1. |

| 21 July 2007 Quarter-final | Kilcummin | 0-08 - 0-07 | East Kerry | FitzGerald Stadium |
| | DJ Fleming 0-6, B Brosnan 0-2. | | M O'Donoghue 0-4, D O'Sullivan 0-1, F McAuliffe 0-1, D O'Connor 0-1. |

| 23 September 2007 Quarter-final replay | Mid Kerry | 0-15 - 1-07 | Kerins O'Rahilly's | J. P. O'Sullivan Park |
| | K Foley 0-5, Darran O'Sullivan 0-3, S O'Sullivan 0-2, R O'Connor 0-2, Terry O'Sullivan 0-1, E O'Malley 0-1, G Sayers 0-1. | | M O'Sullivan 1-2, D Quill 0-3, T Walsh 0-1, P Madden 0-1. |

=== Semi-finals ===
| 23 September 2007 Semi-final | Feale Rangers | 0-08 - 0-08 | Kilcummin | Austin Stack Park |
| | N Kennelly 0-2, D Galvin 0-2, E Fitzmaurice 0-2, P Galvin 0-1, D Griffin 0-1. | | DJ Fleming 0-5, K Murphy 0-1, E O'Donoghue 0-1, P O'Donoghue 0-1. |

| 29 September 2007 Semi-final replay | Feale Rangers | 1-11 - 1-08 | Kilcummin | Austin Stack Park |
| | N Kennelly 0-6, P Galvin 1-2, S McCarthy 0-1, D Galvin 0-1, E Galvin 0-1. | | DJ Fleming 0-6, E O'Donoghue 1-0, K O'Donoghue 0-1, S McSweeney 0-1. |

| 30 September 2007 Semi-final | South Kerry | 1-08 - 1-08 | Mid Kerry | FitzGerald Stadium |
| | B Sheehan 0-5, R O'Connor 1-0, R Hussey 0-2, S Fogarty 0-1. | | K Foley 1-5, S O'Sullivan 0-2, D O'Sullivan 0-1. |

| 6 October 2007 Semi-final replay | South Kerry | 0-10 - 0-10 (aet) | Mid Kerry | FitzGerald Stadium |
| | Declan O'Sullivan 0-3, R Hussey 0-2, K Young 0-1, J Sugrue 0-1, R O'Connor 0-1, S Fogarty 0-1, B Sheehan 0-1. | | K Foley 0-5, S O'Sullivan 0-3, Darran O'Sullivan 0-1, A O'Connor 0-1. |

| 12 October 2007 Semi-final 2nd replay | South Kerry | 1-18 - 0-05 | Mid Kerry | FitzGerald Stadium |
| | B Sheehan 1-3, P Curran 0-6, R Hussey 0-3, R O'Connor 0-3, Declan O'Sullivan 0-1, Aidan O'Sullivan 0-1, B Galvin 0-1. | | R O'Connor 0-1, A O'Connor 0-1, R McGrath 0-1, S O'Sullivan 0-1, D Walsh 0-1. |

=== Final ===
| 11 November 2007 Final | Feale Rangers | 1-04 - 0-06 | South Kerry | Austin Stack Park |
| | B Scanlon 1-1; N Kennelly (free), D Galvin and E Fitzmaurice 0-1. | | B Sheehan 0-3 frees; R Hussey 0-2 frees; J Sugrue 0-1. | Referee: P O'SUllivan (Firies) |

== Championship statistics ==
=== Top scorers ===
Overall

| Rank | Player | Club | Tally | Total | Matches | Average |
|---|---|---|---|---|---|---|
| 1 | D. J. Fleming | Kilcummin | 0-41 | 41 | 6 | 6.83 |
| 1 | Noel Kennelly | Feale Rangers | 1-30 | 33 | 7 | 4.71 |
| 3 | Bryan Sheehan | South Kerry | 1-21 | 24 | 6 | 4.00 |
| 4 | Kieran Foley | Mid Kerry | 2-16 | 20 | 8 | 2.50 |
| 5 | Mike Frank Russell | Laune Rangers | 3-12 | 21 | 3 | 7.00 |
| 5 | Derek Twiss | Milltown/Castlemaine | 0-21 | 21 | 5 | 4.20 |
| 7 | Seán O'Sullivan | Mid Kerry | 1-15 | 18 | 8 | 2.25 |
| 7 | James O'Donoghue | Killarney Legion | 1-15 | 18 | 3 | 6.00 |
| 9 | Ronan Hussey | South Kerry | 0-16 | 16 | 6 | 2.66 |
| 10 | Colm Cooper | Dr. Crokes | 1-14 | 17 | 3 | 5.66 |

In a single game

| Rank | Player | Club | Tally | Total | Opposition |
|---|---|---|---|---|---|
| 1 | Mike Frank Russell | Laune Rangers | 2-05 | 11 | John Mitchels |
| 1 | Barry O'Grady | Shannon Rangers | 1-08 | 11 | West Kerry |
| 3 | Noel Kennelly | Feale Rangers | 1-07 | 10 | St. Kieran's |
| 3 | D. J. Fleming | Kilcummin | 0-10 | 10 | Kenmare |
| 5 | Colm Cooper | Dr. Crokes | 1-05 | 8 | South Kerry |
| 5 | Kieran Foley | Mid Kerry | 1-05 | 8 | South Kerry |
| 5 | Derek Twiss | Milltown/Castlemaine | 0-08 | 8 | Dingle |
| 8 | James O'Donoghue | Killarney Legion | 1-04 | 7 | Ardfert |
| 8 | David Devane | Dingle | 1-04 | 7 | Milltown/Castlemaine |
| 8 | Bryan Costello | John Mitchels | 1-04 | 7 | Milltown/Castlemaine |
| 8 | Mike Frank Russell | Laune Rangers | 1-04 | 7 | Mid Kerry |
| 8 | D. J. Fleming | Kilcummin | 0-07 | 7 | Austin Stacks |
| 8 | D. J. Fleming | Kilcummin | 0-07 | 7 | Rathmore |

=== Miscellaneous ===
- Feale Rangers win a first title in 27 years.
- South Kerry are the first team to qualify for four finals in a row since John Mitchels between 1959-62.
- Kilcummin play in the Munster Senior Club Football Championship.
- Ardfert make their first appearance at senior level.
