= Enda Galvin =

Irish Gaelic footballer & hurler (born 1979)

Personal information
- Native name: Enda Ó Galbháin (Irish)
- Born: 2 November 1979 (age 46) Lixnaw, County Kerry
- Height: 6 ft 0 in (183 cm)

Sport
- Sport: Gaelic football
- Position: bench warmer
Club
- Years: Club
- 1998-2015 1998-2015: Finuge Lixnaw
Club titles
- Kerry junior b titles: 1 (F) 3 (H)
Inter-county
Years	County	Apps (scores)
2000-2002	Kerry	4
Inter-county titles
- Munster titles: 1
- All-Irelands: 1
- NFL: 0
- All Stars: 0

Enda Galvin is a Gaelic footballer and hurler from County Kerry, Ireland. He plays his club football with his local club Finuge and with his divisional side Feale Rangers and has enjoyed much success. He also plays hurling with his local club Lixnaw. Galvin also played for the Kerry senior football team in 2000.

== Playing career ==
=== Club ===
==== Finuge ====
In 2002 Galvin tasted victory for the first time as a footballer when Finuge qualified for the final of the county junior championship. The opponents on that occasion were Castlegregory. A 0-12 to 1-6 victory gave Finuge the victory and gave Galvin a county junior winner's medal. Finuge subsequently represented Kerry in the provincial junior championship and even reached the final. Cork champions Kiskeam provided the opposition, however, the dream season continued for the Kerry men. Galvin added a Munster junior winner's medal to his collection following a 0-14 to 0-11 victory, but Galvin often declared his desire to join local rivals St. Senans as he once said "The Saints are the new and upcoming team in North Kerry football". He never actually transferred because St Senans would not complete the signing of the transfer papers.

After surrendering their county title for a year, Finuge were back in the county junior final again in 2004. Lispole were the opponents this time around and a close game developed once again. After a period of extra-time Finuge regained the title on a score line of 1-10 to 1-7. Another provincial decider beckoned for Galvin's side, with Cork champions Aghabullogue providing the opposition. The game was an exciting but one-sided affair, and Galvin picked up a second Munster junior winner's medal after a 2-13 to 3-4 victory. On this occasion the Kerry side went all the way to the All-Ireland final where Stewartstown Harps of Tyrone were waiting. Galvin gave an outstanding display in that game and the northerners were easily brushed aside on a score line of 1-14 to 0-6. This win gave Galvin an All-Ireland club winner's medal in the junior grade.

==== Feale Rangers ====
In 2007 Galvin lined out with divisional side Feale Rangers in the final of the county senior championship. A divisional side from the other half of the county, South Kerry provided the opposition. Furthermore, South Kerry were going for a remarkable fourth county title in succession. The game was an extremely close affair, however, Galvin's side pulled through to win by 1-5 to 0-6. With that he added a county senior winner's medal to his collection. It was Rangers' first county triumph in twenty-seven years.

==== Lixnaw ====
Galvin is also a hurler of note and has enjoyed much success with Lixnaw. In 1999 he was a key member of the team that lined out against Crotta O'Neill's in the final of the county senior championship. After a 2-8 apiece draw, Lixnaw made no mistake in the replay and secured a narrow 0-9 to 1-5 victory. It was his first senior winner's medal in hurling.

After back-to-back county final defeats in 2002 and 2003, Lixnaw were back in 2005 and faced Abbeydorney. Lixnaw made no mistake on the second occasion and blew the opposition off the pitch. An enormous 0-17 to 0-6 victory gave Galvin a second county winner's medal.

After surrendering the hurling title the following year, Lixnaw were back to reclaim it in 2007. Kilmoyley provided the opposition in another final as Galvin's side went into the game as underdogs. The form book was torn up as Lixnaw powered to a 1-12 to 2-6 victory and a third county winner's medal for Galvin. Galvan was Man of the Match in this game.

=== Intercounty ===
Galvin first came to prominence on the inter-county scene as a member of the Kerry minor football team in the late 1990s. He lined out in his only provincial decider in that grade in 1997 with Limerick providing the opposition. The game was a huge triumph for 'the Kingdom' as Galvin's side won by 4-12 to 1-7. It was his first Munster winner's medal at minor level. Kerry were later defeated in the subsequent All-Ireland semi-final. The same year he won an All-Ireland Vocational Schools Championship with the Kerry Vocational Schools team following victory over Tyrone in the final. He then moved on to the Under 21 team and won a Munster championship in 1999 before losing out in the All Ireland final to Westmeath.

Galvin joined the Kerry senior football team in the early 2000s. He was part of the Kerry side that won the 2000 All Ireland Title.
