= Tom Costelloe =

Tom Costelloe may refer to:

- Tom Costelloe (Tralee Mitchels Gaelic footballer) (1887–1934), Irish Gaelic footballer with the Kerry senior football team
- Tom Costelloe (Duagh Gaelic footballer) (1928–2023), Irish Gaelic footballer with the Kerry senior football team

== See also ==
- Tom Costello (disambiguation)
