= Kieran Quirke =

Irish Gaelic footballer

Personal information
- Born: County Kerry, Ireland
- Occupation: Teacher
- Height: 6 ft 5 in (196 cm)

Sport
- Sport: Gaelic football
- Position: Back
Club
- Years: Club
- Duagh
Club titles
- Kerry titles: 1
Inter-county
- Years: County
- 2008-2009: Kerry
Inter-county titles
- All-Irelands: 1
- NFL: 1

Kieran Quirke is a Gaelic footballer from Duagh, County Kerry, in Ireland. He plays for Duagh GAA club, the Feale Rangers divisional side and Kerry senior football team.

== Playing career ==
=== Club football ===
In 2006, Quirke won the Kerry Junior Football Championship with Duagh. The team went on to qualify from Munster with Quirke playing a role in their qualification for the All-Ireland Junior Club Football Championship final in 2007. However, Greencastle defeated them by one point in the final.

Quirke went on to win that year's Kerry Senior Football Championship with Feale Rangers as they beat South Kerry by a point in the final.

In 2012, he captained Duagh to a first North Kerry Championship title in 50 years.

=== Inter-county football ===
Quirke played minor with Kerry and was a sub with the Under 21 team. He also played with the county junior and he was a member of the junior team that won a Munster championship in 2008 and later lost the All Ireland semi final. After a few years away from the team, he was back in 2012 and won a second Munster title and later an All Ireland junior title.

He was a member of the Kerry senior panel in 2008 and 2009, playing 5 league games in 2009 and winning a medal as a member of the panel that beat Derry in the final. He also won an All Ireland title later on as a member of the panel.

== Honours ==
Intercounty

- 1 All Ireland Junior Championship
- 2 Munster Junior Championship

Club

- 1 County Senior Championship
- 1 Munster Junior Club Championship
- 1 County Junior Club Championship
