= R555 road =

R555 road may refer to:

- R555 road (Ireland)
- R555 road (South Africa)
