= Killing of Kathleen O'Hagan =

1994 killing in Northern Ireland

- Date: 7 August 1994
- Location: County Tyrone, Northern Ireland
- Deaths: 2 (Kathleen and her unborn child)

On 7 August 1994, Kathleen O'Hagan, a 38-year-old woman who was seven months pregnant, was shot and killed at her home outside Greencastle in County Tyrone. The gunmen struck while she was in the house with her children; her husband was away.

The Ulster Volunteer Force (UVF) later said it was responsible for the attack. No one has been arrested or convicted in relation to the killing.

== Background ==
Kathleen McPeake was originally from Bellaghy, County Londonderry, and moved to County Tyrone after marrying Paddy O'Hagan. The couple lived in a rural bungalow near Greencastle, County Tyrone with their five children. At the time of her death, she was seven months pregnant with their sixth child.

Paddy was a former republican prisoner who had served a sentence in the Maze Prison for firearms possession. Reports described the family as having faced sustained harassment by Crown forces following his release. He was reportedly stopped frequently at checkpoints while travelling with his sons, removed from the car, subjected to aggressive searches, and threatened.

In 1988, security forces raided the O'Hagan home. The house was sealed off for several days, during which JCB diggers were brought in to excavate the floors of the property. Paddy was arrested during the operation.

== Killing ==
On 7 August 1994, O'Hagan, aged 38, was at home with her five young children, the eldest aged eight, while her husband attended a family reunion. Gunmen forced entry through the back door using a sledgehammer. Her youngest child, Thomas, aged 15 months, was lying in a cot in the bedroom with her at the time. One of O'Hagan's sons later recalled hearing a loud crash in the kitchen, followed by her pleading, "No, no, don’t do this", before shots were fired. O'Hagan and her unborn child were killed. Her children entered the room and found her body; Thomas was still in the cot, unharmed. The bedroom contained multiple bullet holes in the walls, including above the cot. The children hid until their father returned.

== Aftermath ==
The Royal Ulster Constabulary (RUC) took more than two hours to respond to the emergency call, and the perpetrators had fled. A helicopter dispatched during the search failed to spot the getaway car, which was later found burned out by neighbours about a mile from the house.

The Ulster Volunteer Force (UVF) claimed responsibility for the killing, issuing a statement to a local radio station in which it alleged that O'Hagan had republican sympathies and had been "executed" by its mid-Ulster "active service unit." It added that her husband would also have been killed had he been home.

Thomas, whose cot had narrowly escaped gunfire during the attack, died on 19 August 1997 at the age of four after sustaining injuries in a hay shed fire. Two other sons also died in later years: Niall, aged 19, in a motorbike accident on 12 July 2008, and Patrick, aged 34, on 10 December 2020. Their father, Paddy, died on 11 March 2002 at the age of 49.

In 2015, O'Hagan's family lodged a formal complaint with the Police Ombudsman's Office, citing serious concerns about how the investigation had been handled. They questioned the delay in police response, the absence of forensic follow-up, and the broader implications of potential collusion. As of 2023, the family stated they had heard nothing from the Ombudsman since submitting the complaint.
