= Feale Rangers GAA =

Divisional Gaelic football team

Feale Rangers
- Fáinaithe na Féile
- Founded: 1956
- County: Kerry
- Colours: Gold & Blue

Playing kits
Standard colours

Senior Club Championships
	All Ireland	Munster champions	Kerry champions
Football:	0	0	3

Feale Rangers is a Divisional Gaelic football team which is made up of clubs based around the River Feale in North Kerry. The team competes in the Kerry Senior Football Championship which it has won on three occasions.

== History ==
Feale Rangers were founded in 1956 as a divisional side to represent North Kerry clubs in the Kerry Senior Football Championship of that year after two earlier sides, North Kerry and Shannon Rangers joined forces. The team reached its first County Final in 1959 which they lost to John Mitchels after a replay. Their next final appearance was in 1962 and again they lost to John Mitchels in a replay. The following year Rangers would lose to John Mitchels yet again in the Championship, this time at the semi-final stage.

In 1964 Listowel Emmets, Moyvane and Tarbert left Feale Rangers and formed a new team called St. Vincents. The remaining clubs then reformed Shannon Rangers and both teams competed in the 1964 Kerry Senior Football Championship with Shannon Rangers winning the title. St. Vincents had little success in the County Championship and in 1971 its three clubs were joined by Ballydonoghue, Clounmacon, Duagh, Finuge, Knockanure and St. Senan's and Feale Rangers were reformed. The following year Ballydonoghue returned to Shannon Rangers with Tarbert subsequently joining them later. Both sides were to switch allegiance again and rejoined Feale Rangers prior to the 1977 Kerry Senior Football Championship. They reached the final that year after a gap of 15 years, but lost to their neighbours and rivals Shannon Rangers.

Feale Rangers would meet Shannon Rangers again in the 1978 Kerry Senior Football Championship, this time at the semi-final stage and defeated them to reach the final again. In the final they defeated Mid Kerry 8pts to 3, to win the Championship for the first time in their history. Two years later Rangers were back in the Championship final having defeated Mid Kerry again, this time in the semi-final. In the final they defeated Austin Stacks 1–10 to 1–07. They reached the final again in 1982, 1983 and 1985, but lost all three.

By the time Feale Rangers reached the Championship final again, both Ballydonoghue and Tarbert had returned to Shannon Rangers, leaving them with the current member clubs. That final was in 1999 and ended in defeat for the Fealesiders. In 2007 Feale Rangers won their third Kerry Senior Football Championship title, defeating South Kerry 1–04 to 0–06. It was Rangers last appearance in the Senior Football Championship decider, with their best performances since being semi-final appearances in 2009, 2013 and 2022.

== Member Clubs ==
The team is selected from the following clubs:

- Clounmacon
- Duagh
- Finuge
- Knockanure
- Listowel Emmets
- Moyvane
- St Senan's

== Honours ==
- Kerry Senior Football Championship
  Winners:(3) 1978, 1980, 2007
  Runners-Up:(7) 1959, 1962, 1977, 1982, 1983, 1985, 1999
- Kerry Minor Football Championship
  Winners:(3) 1978, 1979, 1983
  Runners-Up:(2) 1971, 1995
- Kerry Under-21 Football Championship
  Winners:(2) 1997, 1998
  Runners-Up:(1) 2019

== Divisional competitions ==
- North Kerry Senior Football Championship

== Notable players ==
- Eamonn Breen
- Johnny Bunyan
- Pat Corridan
- Conor Cox
- Jimmy Deenihan
- Éamonn Fitzmaurice
- Paul Galvin
- Brendan Guiney
- Noel Kennelly
- Tadhg Kennelly
- Tim Kennelly
- Anthony Maher
- Garry McMahon
- Bernie O'Callaghan
- Stephen Stack

== See also ==
- Kerry GAA
