= Tom Costelloe (Duagh Gaelic footballer) =

Irish Gaelic footballer (1928–2023)

Tom Costello
Personal information
- Native name: Tomás Mac Coisteala (Irish)
- Born: 6 July 1928 Duagh, County Kerry, Ireland
- Died: 3 August 2023
- Occupation: Farmer
- Height: 5 ft 9 in (175 cm)

Sport
- Sport: Gaelic football
- Position: Centre-forward
Club
- Years: Club
- Duagh
Club titles
- Kerry titles: 0
Inter-county
Years	County	Apps (scores)
1952-1955	Kerry	3 (2-02)
Inter-county titles
- Munster titles: 1
- All-Irelands: 1
- NFL: 0

Thomas Costello (6 July 1928 – 3 August 2023) was an Irish Gaelic footballer who played for club side Duagh and at inter-county level with the Kerry senior football team.

== Career ==
Costelloe first came to prominence as a Gaelic footballer with the Duagh club. After making a number of National League appearances for the Kerry senior football team, he won an All-Ireland Junior Championship title in 1954. This victory saw Costelloe drafted onto the senior team for the 1955 Munster Championship. He won a provincial championship medal that year before ending the season with an All-Ireland title after a defeat of Dublin in the final. Costelloe ended his career by winning a league title in 1959.

== Death ==
Costello died on 3 August 2023.

== Honours ==
Kerry

- All-Ireland Senior Football Championship: 1955
- Leinster Senior Football Championship: 1955
- National Football League: 1958-59
- All-Ireland Junior Football Championship: 1954
- Munster Junior Football Championship: 1954
