= Stephen Stack =

Irish Gaelic footballer

Personal information
- Native name: Stiofáin de Staic (Irish)
- Born: Listowel, County Kerry
- Height: 5 ft 10 in (178 cm)

Sport
- Sport: Gaelic football
- Position: Full/Half Back
Club
- Years: Club
- 1980s-2000s: Listowel Emmets
Inter-county
Years	County	Apps (scores)
1986-1998	Kerry	16 (0-00)
Inter-county titles
- Munster titles: 3
- All-Irelands: 2 (1 sub)

Stephen Stack was a Gaelic footballer who played with Kerry and Listowel Emmets. He was right corner back on the Kerry team that won the 1997 All Ireland. He was also a member of the 1986 winning team which made him the sole winner of medals in 1986 and 1997. He also won an All Ireland Junior Medal in 1994. He had a reputation as a tight marking defender and a leader in the backs. In 2012 he was unveiled as the manager of Austin Stacks GAA club located in Tralee, County Kerry, the most successful club in Ireland.

== Club ==
At club level he lined out with the Listowel Emmets club and divisional side Feale Rangers.

With Listowel Emmets he won a Kerry Junior Football Championship in 1999 as the team's captain. He won a Kerry Intermediate Football Championship in 2002 after a win over Dingle in the final.

He won four North Kerry Senior Football Championship titles with the club in 1991, as captain, 1997, 1998 and 2004.

With Feale Rangers he lined out in the 1999 Kerry Senior Football Championship final but was on the losing side to East Kerry.

== Underage ==
Stack first lined out with the Kerry minor team in 1984. He had little success however as Kerry had a surprise Munster final loss to Tipperary.

He soon joined the county's Under 21 side. His first two seasons saw no success as losses to Clare in 1985 and Cork in 1986.

He was still underage in 1987 and had more success. A replay win over Tipperary saw Stack win a Munster title. His side later qualified for the All-Ireland final after overcoming Galway in the semi-final. They faced Donegal in the final. Like in the Munster final the sides finished level and a replay was needed. The title went to the Ulster champions however after a 1–12 to 2–04 loss.

== Junior ==
Stack played with the Kerry junior team for three season between 1988 and 1990. He had little success, as Kerry lost two Munster finals in a row to Cork in 1989 and 1990.

Having lost his place in the senior panel he rejoined the junior team in 1994. He missed out on the side Munster championship final win but returned for the All-Ireland campaign. He lined out in the semi-final win over Dublin, a game where he scored two points. He also scored a point in the All-Ireland final win over Galway.

== Senior ==
Stack first joined the Kerry senior team during the 1985/86 National League, where he played in six games. He played in the first round of the Munster championship when Kerry overcame Tipperary. He played no other games during the season but did pick up an All-Ireland medal as a panel member when Kerry beat Tyrone.

He played in all of Kerry's 1986/87 National League campaign. He played no part in the championship.

He returned to the team for the 1989/90 League. He played his first championship game in four seasons when he lined out in the Munster final against Cork. It wasn't a good day for the Kingdom however as they suffered one of their biggest losses to Cork on a 2–23 to 1–11 scoreline.

In 1991 Kerry had a first championship win over Cork since 1986 to book a Munster final with Limerick. The game went to extra-time but Kerry came out on top to give Stack a first Munster medal on the field of play. Kerry later lost out to Down in the All-Ireland semi-final.

Wins over Cork and Limerick saw Stack and Kerry back in the Munster final, where they faced Clare. It looked like a second Munster title was in store, but in one of the all time championship upsets Clare won the title.

Despite playing in the latter half of the 1992/93 National League Stack lost his place on the panel for the championship and would be in the wilderness for the next number of seasons.

He returned during the 1995/96 National League after a few seasons away. He missed out on the Munster championship first round but was back for the semi-final win over Waterford. He later lined out in a first Munster final since 1992 when Kerry faced Cork. In the end Kerry won out 0–14 to 0–11 to give Stack his second Munster medal. Kerry later lost out to Mayo in the All-Ireland semi-final.

Stack missed much of Kerry's National League and championship games in 1997. He played no part in the Munster championship but was back in the team for the All-Ireland semi-final. He was Left Corner Back as Kerry beat Cavan to book a first All-Ireland final since 1986. Where he had been a sub in 1986 he was in the starting 15 for the clash with Mayo. In the end Kerry did enough to take the title and give Stack his second All-Ireland medal and first on the field of play.

He played in all of Kerry's 1997/98 National League games, including the first round clash with Cavan in New York. He later won his third Munster medal after Kerry overcame Tipperary in the final. Kerry's season came to an end when they lost out to Kildare in the All-Ireland semi-final. This was his last championship game with Kerry.
