= Pat Corridan =

Irish hurler and Gaelic footballer

Pat Corridan is a Gaelic footballer from Finuge, County Kerry, in Ireland. Corrdian plays football for the Finuge GAA club, Feale Rangers divisional side and Kerry senior football team.

== Club career ==
In 2004, Corridan was a member of the Finuge team which won the Kerry Junior Football Championship and went on to win the Munster Championship. The team then reached the All-Ireland Junior Football Championship final in March 2005 and defeated Stewartstown Harps by 11 points to take the title, with Corridan at corner-back.

In 2007, Corridan was full-back on the Feale Rangers team which won the Kerry Senior Football Championship for the first time since 1980.

== Career with Kerry ==
Corridan impressed at centre-back with the Kerry junior team in the 2008 All-Ireland Junior Football Championship. He won a Munster Junior Football Championship medal with Kerry that year. The Finuge man was also called into the Kerry senior panel and was a member of the squad which reached the 2008 All-Ireland Senior Football Championship final. Corridan has recently withdrawn from the 2009 Kerry Panel while his brother Maurice's career in the green and gold seems to be blossoming.

As the 2009 season draws to a close and with Corridan being fiercely impressive with divisional outfit Feale Rangers, he is poised to re-join the Kerry Senior Football Panel for the 2010 campaign.

== Hurling career ==
Pat Corridan is also a hurler with Lixnaw and the holder of two Kerry County Hurling Championships.
