= 2006–07 All-Ireland Junior Club Football Championship =

- Sponsor: Allied Irish Bank
- Champions: St Patrick's, Greencastle (1st title)
- Runners-up: Duagh

The 2006–07 All-Ireland Junior Club Football Championship was the sixth staging of the All-Ireland Junior Club Football Championship since its establishment by the Gaelic Athletic Association.

The All-Ireland final was played on 10 March 2007 at Croke Park in Dublin, between St Patrick's, Greencastle and Duagh. St Patrick's, Greencastle won the match by 0-13 to 0-12 to claim their first ever championship title.

== All-Ireland Junior Club Football Championship ==
=== All-Ireland final ===
| 10 March 2007 Final | St Patrick's, Greencastle | 0-13 - 0-12 | Duagh | Croke Park |
| | T McDermott 0-6 (0-2 frees), B Tracey 0-3 (frees), M Conway, E Clarke, B McNulty, D MacDiarmada 0-1 each. | | T Dillon 0-6 (frees), A Maher, A Kelly 0-2 each, D Lane, T Scanlon 0-1 each. | Referee: D Fahy (Longford) |
