= Brendan Guiney =

Irish Gaelic footballer

Personal information
- Born: Listowel, County Kerry

Sport
- Sport: Gaelic football
- Position: Half back
Club
- Years: Club
- Listowel Emmets
Club titles
- Kerry titles: 2
Inter-county
Years	County	Apps (scores)
2004-2006	Kerry	3(0-00)
Inter-county titles
- Munster titles: 0
- All-Irelands: 3

Brendan Guiney is a Gaelic footballer from Listowel, County Kerry. He played with the Kerry intercounty team at all levels during the 2000s.

He played his club football with the Listowel Emmets club and with Feale Rangers.

== Club ==
He played his club football with the Listowel Emmets club and with Feale Rangers. He won a Kerry Intermediate Football Championship title in 2002. He has also won a number of North Kerry Senior Football Championship titles in 2004, 2008, 2009, 2013, 2015.

With Feale Rangers he won a Kerry Senior Football Championship title in 2007.

== Minor ==
Guiney first played with the Kerry minor team in 1999. He had little success as Kerry lost to Cork in the Munster final.

== Under 21 ==
He then moved on to the Under 21 team in 2002. He help Kerry overcome Clare to win the Munster title. Guiney's side lost out to Galway in the All-Ireland semi-final.

== Junior ==
In 2002 Guiney joined the Kerry junior side, his only appearance being the first round Munster in over Limerick.

Guiney made a return to the junior side in 2010 when he won a Munster title after overcoming Limerick in the final. Kerry later qualified for the All-Ireland final, where they had a surprise loss to Sligo.

== Senior ==
Guiney first joined the Kerry senior team during the 2004 National League, where he played six games. He was part of the panel during that summers championship. He played no part during the championship until a surprise appearance during the All-Ireland final win over Mayo to pick up his first All-Ireland medal.

He again lined out during the 2005 National League during the spring. His only championship game in the Munster championship first-round win over Tipperary.

He played no part during the 2006 National League but was back on the panel for the championship. Like in 2004 his only appearance was in the All-Ireland final win over Mayo, as he picked up his second All-Ireland medal. This was to be his last championship game with Kerry.

He played four games during the 2007 National League. After a few seasons away he made a surprise return during the 2010 National League.

== Honours ==
=== Listowel ===
- Kerry Intermediate Football Championship:
  - Winner (1): 2002
  - Runner-up (1): 2007

=== Feale Rangers ===
- Kerry Senior Football Championship
  - Winner (1): 2007

=== Kerry ===
- All-Ireland Senior Football Championship:
  - Winner (3): 2004, 2006
- Munster Under-21 Football Championship:
  - Winner (1): 2002
- Munster Minor Football Championship:
  - Winner (0):
  - Runner-up (1): 1999
- All-Ireland Junior Football Championship:
  - Runner-up (1): 2010
- Munster Junior Football Championship:
  - Winner (1): 2010
