= Jimmy Deenihan =

Irish former Gaelic footballer and politician (born 1952)

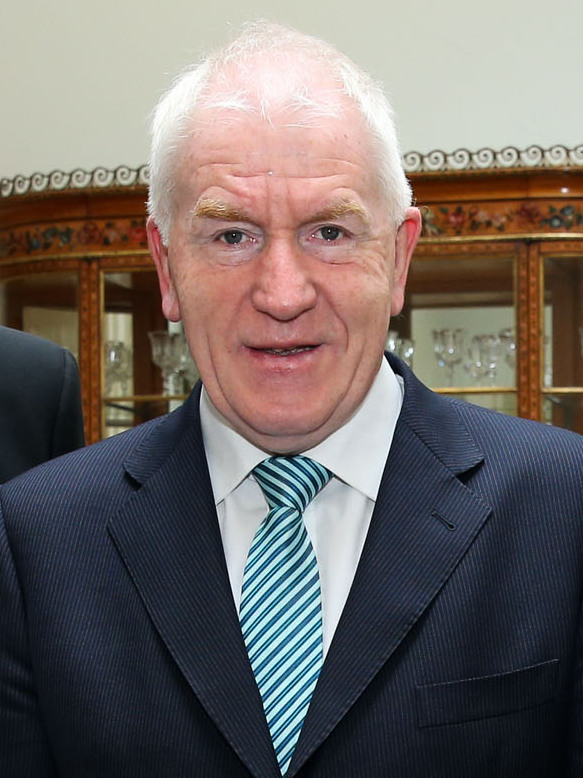
- Deenihan in 2013

Minister of State
- 2014–2016: Foreign Affairs and Trade
- 2014–2016: Taoiseach
- 1994–1997: Agriculture, Food and Forestry

Minister for Arts, Heritage and the Gaeltacht
- In office 9 March 2011 – 11 July 2014
- Taoiseach: Enda Kenny
- Preceded by: Mary Hanafin
- Succeeded by: Heather Humphreys

Teachta Dála
- In office February 2011 – February 2016
- Constituency: Kerry North–West Limerick
- In office February 1987 – February 2011
- Constituency: Kerry North

Senator
- In office 23 February 1983 – 17 February 1987
- Constituency: Nominated by the Taoiseach

Personal details
- Born: James Deenihan; 11 September 1952 (age 74) Lixnaw, County Kerry, Ireland
- Party: Fine Gael
- Spouse: Mary Dowling (m. 1988)
- Education: Thomond College

Jimmy Deenihan (born 11 September 1952) is an Irish former Fine Gael politician who served as Minister of State for the Diaspora from 2014 to 2016, Minister for Arts, Heritage and the Gaeltacht from 2011 to 2014 and Minister of State at the Department of Agriculture, Food and Forestry from 1994 to 1997. He served as a Teachta Dála (TD) from 1987 to 2016. He was a Senator from 1983 to 1987, after being nominated by the Taoiseach.

Deenihan played Gaelic football for the Kerry county team in the 1970s and 1980s. He also played rugby with Garryowen.

== Early and private life ==
Deenihan was born in Finuge, Lixnaw, County Kerry, in 1952. He was educated at St Michael's College, Listowel and later at the Thomond College of Education in Limerick. He also spent time in college in the UK. He is married to Mary, daughter of former Kerry footballer John Dowling, who is a teacher of history and economics in Mercy Secondary School, Mounthawk.

== Football career ==
Jimmy Deenihan
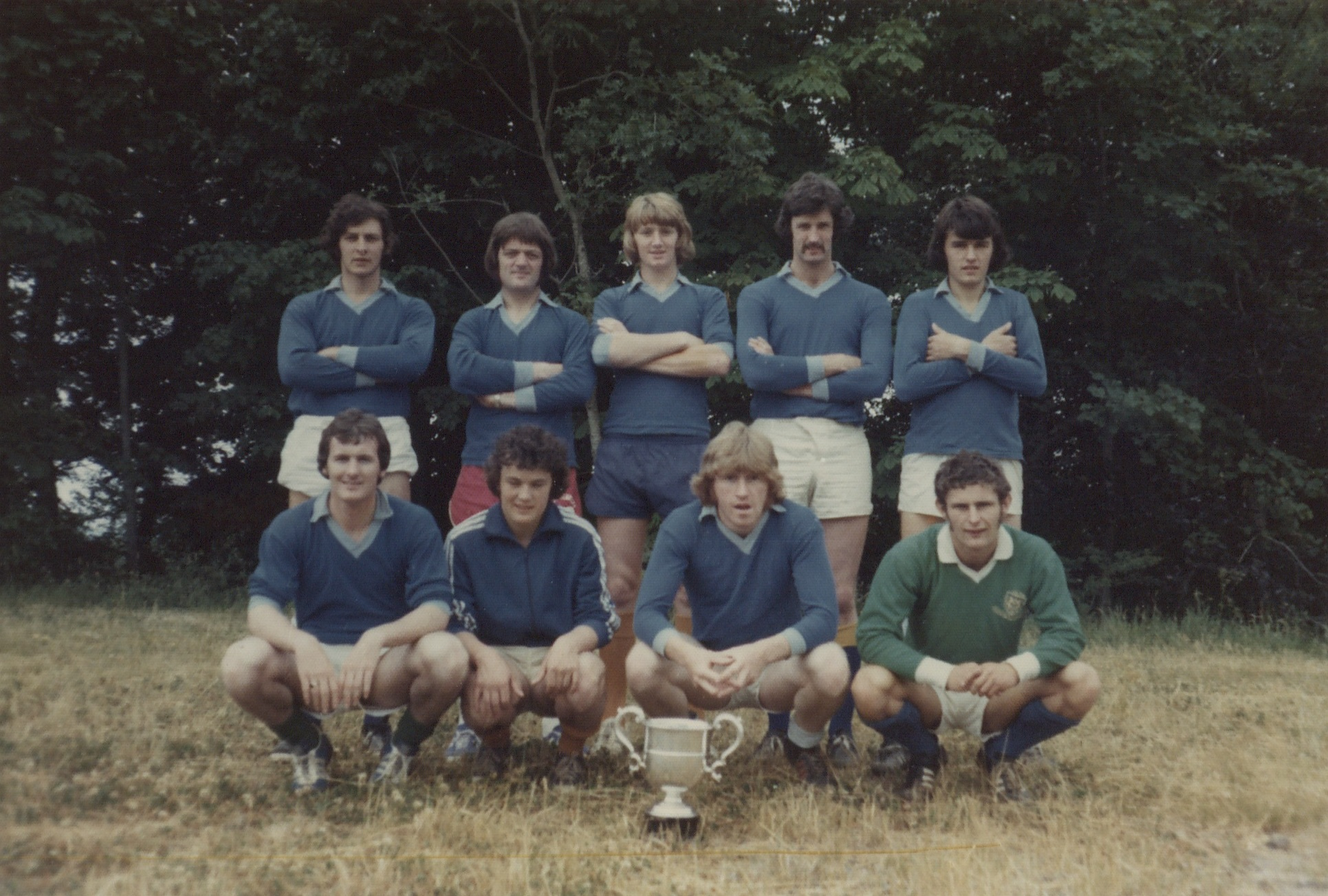
- Deenihan in 1975 (front row, centre right)

Sport
- Sport: Gaelic football
- Position: Right corner-back
Club
- Years: Club
- 1963–1990: Finuge
Club titles
- Kerry titles: 2
Inter-county
Years	County	Apps (scores)
1973–1982	Kerry	29 (0-00)
Inter-county titles
- Munster titles: 7
- All-Irelands: 5

=== Club ===
Deenihan had much success at club and divisional level with his local teams. At under-age level he won an under-14 North Kerry Championship with Finuge in 1963. Five years later in 1968, he won an under-16 North Kerry Championship with the Listowel Emmet's club. He also played with the St Senan's club at minor level. With Finuge Deenihan also won a North Kerry Senior League title in 1970, as well as a North Kerry Senior Championship title in 1987. With his local divisional team, Feale Rangers, he won two senior county championship medals in 1978 and 1980. While in college at St Mary's University, Twickenham in London he played with the Kingdom club and won a London Senior Football Championship.

=== Inter-county ===
By the late 1960s, Deenihan was a key part of Kerry's inter-county set-up and was playing on the county's minor team. In 1970, he won a Munster minor medal, however, he never won an All-Ireland medal. Deenihan later moved on to the county's under-21 team, where he won back-to-back Munster titles in 1972 and 1973, as well as an All-Ireland title in 1973.

By this stage, Deenihan was also a member of the Kerry senior football team. He won his first National Football League medal in 1973, however, Cork were the kingpins in the Munster Championship. Two years later in 1975, Deenihan captured his first Munster Championship and All-Ireland medals at senior level, under the new management of the legendary Mick O'Dwyer. It was the beginning of a glorious era for Kerry football and Deenihan played a key role in orchestrating much of the success.

In 1976, Deenihan won his second Munster title, however, Dublin gained revenge for the previous year by defeating Kerry in the All-Ireland final. 1977 was another frustrating year as Kerry won another set of National league and Munster titles but lost out to Dublin yet again, this time in the All-Ireland semi-final. By 1978, Kerry were ready for success. They easily won another Munster title and breezed into the All-Ireland final to face Dublin. The game itself is remembered for Mikey Sheehy's cheeky goal which he scored by lobbing the ball over the head of Paddy Cullen. The final score was 5–11 to 0–9 and Deenihan had finally secured a second All-Ireland medal. In 1979, Deenihan captured a fifth provincial title before later capturing a third All-Ireland medal following another emphatic victory over Dublin.

In 1980, Kerry breezed through the Munster Championship once again and later defeated Roscommon to win a third consecutive All-Ireland title. In 1981, Deenihan was appointed captain of the Kerry senior football team. It was a very special year as he collected his seventh consecutive Munster Championship medal before later leading Kerry out in a fourth All-Ireland final appearance. On the day the men from 'the Kingdom' easily defeated Offaly to give Deenihan his fifth All-Ireland medal. He rounded off the year by being presented with an All-Star award. At the start of 1982 Deenihan won a third National League medal when he captained Kerry to victory over Cork. Later that summer he broke his leg in training. He remained out of the game for eight months, meaning the injury effectively ended his inter-county career. Deenihan's last appearance in a Kerry jersey was in May 1983 when he played a challenge game at the opening of the Tarbert GAA field.

Deenihan also won Railway Cup medals with Munster in 1975, 1976, 1978, 1981 and 1982.

== Political career ==
=== Seanad and Dáil Éireann ===
As Deenihan's inter-county football career was drawing to a close, his political career was just beginning. He unsuccessfully contested Kerry North at the November 1982 general election. In 1983, he was appointed to Seanad Éireann as a nominee of Taoiseach Garret FitzGerald. Deenihan later became involved in local politics as a member of Kerry County Council. He was elected to Dáil Éireann for the first time at the 1987 general election, for Kerry North, and was re-elected there at the six subsequent general elections.

Deenihan held a number of front bench portfolios for Fine Gael, including Youth and Sport (1988–1992) and Tourism and Trade (1992–1994) while Fine Gael were in opposition. In 1994 Fine Gael came to office without a general election, and on 20 December 1994 Deenihan was appointed by the Fine Gael–Labour–Democratic Left coalition government as Minister of State at the Department of Agriculture, Food and Forestry. In 1997, he became party spokesperson for the Office of Public Works. In the 2002 general election, which resulted in a near meltdown for Fine Gael, Deenihan saw his toughest election to date, being re-elected by a margin of almost 500 votes ahead of sitting TD Dick Spring. After the election of Enda Kenny as party leader he again received a Fine Gael front bench position as party spokesperson for Arts, Sport and Tourism. In the aftermath of the 2007 general election, he became party spokesperson on Defence, after being elected atop the poll in the Kerry North constituency with 12,697 votes. In July 2010, he was appointed as party spokesperson on Tourism, Culture and Sport.

=== Minister for Arts, Heritage and the Gaeltacht ===
At the 2011 general election, he was elected for the new constituency of Kerry North–West Limerick. On 9 March 2011, he was appointed a member of the Fine Gael–Labour government as Minister for Arts, Heritage and the Gaeltacht.

In May 2011, he set out proposals to acquire from the Bank of Ireland the old Irish Parliament building in College Green for the state, to use as a cultural venue.

In November 2011, he met with the stars of Titanic: Blood & Steel, while they were filming on location in Dublin.

He was reported by the Irish Examiner as having announced the awarding of the title of City of Culture 2014 to Limerick in June 2012 without indicating the criteria for selection.

=== Minister of State for the Diaspora ===
On 11 July 2014, he was dropped as a cabinet minister in a reshuffle, and was appointed by the government as Minister of State at the Department of the Taoiseach and at the Department of Foreign Affairs and Trade with responsibility for the Diaspora.

His constituency was abolished at the 2016 general election; he stood for election in Kerry, but was not elected.

Political offices
Preceded by Brian O'Shea	Minister of State for Food and Horticulture; 1994–1997	Succeeded by Ned O'Keeffe
Preceded by Mary Hanafin as Minister for Tourism, Culture and Sport	Minister for Arts, Heritage and the Gaeltacht; 2011–2014	Succeeded by Heather Humphreys
New office	Minister of State for the Diaspora; 2014–2016	Succeeded by Joe McHugh
Gaelic games
Preceded by Ger Power	Kerry Senior Football Captain; 1981	Succeeded by John Egan
Preceded by Ger Power (Kerry)	All-Ireland SFC winning captain 1981	Succeeded by Richie Connor (Offaly)

Dáil	Election	Deputy (Party)	Deputy (Party)	Deputy (Party)	Deputy (Party)
9th	1937	Stephen Fuller (FF)	Tom McEllistrim, Snr (FF)	John O'Sullivan (FG)	Eamon Kissane (FF)
10th	1938	Stephen Fuller (FF)	Tom McEllistrim, Snr (FF)	John O'Sullivan (FG)	Eamon Kissane (FF)
11th	1943	Dan Spring (Lab)	Tom McEllistrim, Snr (FF)	Patrick Finucane (CnaT)	Eamon Kissane (FF)
12th	1944	Dan Spring (NLP)	Tom McEllistrim, Snr (FF)	Patrick Finucane (CnaT)	Eamon Kissane (FF)
13th	1948	Dan Spring (NLP)	Tom McEllistrim, Snr (FF)	Patrick Finucane (CnaT)	Eamon Kissane (FF)
14th	1951	Dan Spring (Lab)	Tom McEllistrim, Snr (FF)	Patrick Finucane (Ind.)	John Lynch (FG)
15th	1954	Dan Spring (Lab)	Tom McEllistrim, Snr (FF)	Patrick Finucane (CnaT)	Johnny Connor (CnaP)
15th	1956 by-election	Dan Spring (Lab)	Tom McEllistrim, Snr (FF)	Patrick Finucane (CnaT)	Kathleen O'Connor (CnaP)
16th	1957	Dan Spring (Lab)	Tom McEllistrim, Snr (FF)	Patrick Finucane (Ind.)	Daniel Moloney (FF)
17th	1961	Dan Spring (Lab)	Tom McEllistrim, Snr (FF)	Patrick Finucane (Ind.)	3 seats from 1961
18th	1965	Dan Spring (Lab)	Tom McEllistrim, Snr (FF)	Patrick Finucane (Ind.)	3 seats from 1961
19th	1969	Dan Spring (Lab)	Gerard Lynch (FG)	Tom McEllistrim, Jnr (FF)	3 seats from 1961
20th	1973	Dan Spring (Lab)	Gerard Lynch (FG)	Tom McEllistrim, Jnr (FF)	3 seats from 1961
21st	1977	Dan Spring (Lab)	Kit Ahern (FF)	Tom McEllistrim, Jnr (FF)	3 seats from 1961
22nd	1981	Dick Spring (Lab)	Denis Foley (FF)	Tom McEllistrim, Jnr (FF)	3 seats from 1961
23rd	1982 (Feb)	Dick Spring (Lab)	Denis Foley (FF)	Tom McEllistrim, Jnr (FF)	3 seats from 1961
24th	1982 (Nov)	Dick Spring (Lab)	Denis Foley (FF)	Tom McEllistrim, Jnr (FF)	3 seats from 1961
25th	1987	Dick Spring (Lab)	Denis Foley (FF)	Jimmy Deenihan (FG)	3 seats from 1961
26th	1989	Dick Spring (Lab)	Tom McEllistrim, Jnr (FF)	Jimmy Deenihan (FG)	3 seats from 1961
27th	1992	Dick Spring (Lab)	Denis Foley (FF)	Jimmy Deenihan (FG)	3 seats from 1961
28th	1997	Dick Spring (Lab)	Denis Foley (FF)	Jimmy Deenihan (FG)	3 seats from 1961
29th	2002	Martin Ferris (SF)	Tom McEllistrim (FF)	Jimmy Deenihan (FG)	3 seats from 1961
30th	2007	Martin Ferris (SF)	Tom McEllistrim (FF)	Jimmy Deenihan (FG)	3 seats from 1961
31st	2011	Constituency abolished. See Kerry North–West Limerick			

Dáil	Election	Deputy (Party)	Deputy (Party)	Deputy (Party)
31st	2011	Arthur Spring (Lab)	Martin Ferris (SF)	Jimmy Deenihan (FG)
32nd	2016	Constituency abolished. See Kerry and Limerick County		
