= Barony of Clanmaurice =

Barony in County Kerry, Ireland

Clanmaurice (Irish: Clann Mhuiris) is a barony in County Kerry, Ireland. It contains 16 civil parishes, and is approximately 489 square kilometres (189 sq mi) in area.

== Civil parishes ==
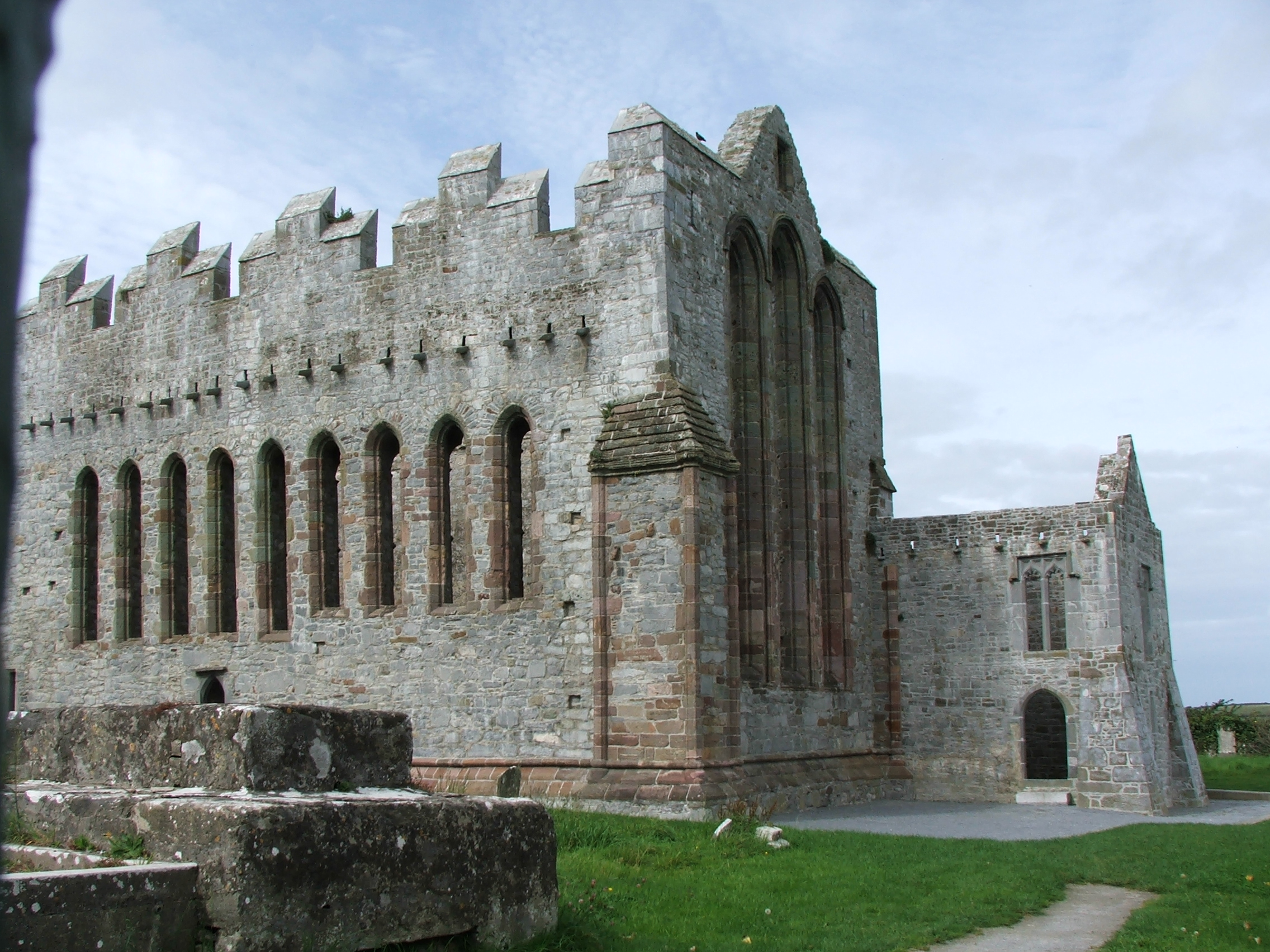
Ardfert Cathedral in the Barony of Clanmaurice

- Ardfert
- Ballyheigue
- Duagh
- Dysert (Partly in Trughanacmy)
- Finuge
- Kilcaragh
- Kilfeighny
- Kilflyn
- Killahan
- Killury
- Kilmoyly
- Kilshenane
- Kiltomy
- Listowel
- O'Dorney
- Rattoo

== See also ==
- List of baronies of Ireland
