= John McGlynn =

John McGlynn may refer to:

- John McGlynn (actor) (born 1953), Scottish actor
- John McGlynn (Scottish footballer) (born 1961), football player and manager
- John McGlynn (Gaelic footballer), Kerry player
- John H. McGlynn (born 1952), American editor/translator
- John J. McGlynn (1922–2016), American politician in Massachusetts
- John McGlynn, musician and member of Anúna
