= Finuge GAA =

Gaelic games club in County Kerry, Ireland

Finuge GAA Club
- Cumann Lúchtchleas Gael Fionnúig
- Founded: 1888
- County: Kerry
- Colours: Green and Gold
- Grounds: O'Sullivan Park Finuge
- Coordinates: 52°25′25.73″N 9°31′58.83″W

Playing kits
Standard colours

Finuge is a Gaelic Athletic Association club from Finuge, County Kerry, Ireland. The senior team currently competes in the Kerry Junior Football Championship. They also form part of the Feale Rangers divisional team that plays in the Kerry Senior Football Championship. Many of the players also play hurling with Lixnaw in the Kerry Senior Hurling Championship. Players from the club have won a total of 17 Senior All-Ireland Gaelic football medals. The club also supplied the Kerry GAA senior team manager from 2012-2018, Éamonn Fitzmaurice who took over from Jack O'Connor as manager of Kerry. Fitzmaurice managed Kerry in the 2014 to a Football All-Ireland Senior Championship victory. He managed Kerry to victory in one National League, six Munster Championships and two McGrath Cups.

== Achievements ==
- All-Ireland Junior Club Football Championship
  - Winners: 2006: 1
- Munster Junior Club Football Championship
  - Winners: 2003, 2005: 2
- Munster Intermediate Club Football Championship
  - Winners: 2012: 1
- Kerry Intermediate Football Championship
  - Winners: 2012: 1
  - Runners-Up: 2005, 2010
- Kerry Junior Football Championship
  - Winners: 1983, 1996, 2002, 2004, 2026: 5
  - Runners-Up: 1998, 2000
- Kerry Novice Football Championship
  - Winners: 1996: 1
  - Runners-Up: 1993
- North Kerry Senior Football Championship
  - Winners: 1967, 1987, 1996, 2001, 2011: 5
  - Runner-Up: 1945, 1972, 1998, 2004, 2007, 2009

== Notable players ==
- Paul Galvin
- Éamonn Fitzmaurice
- Jimmy Deenihan
- Enda Galvin
- Pat Corridan
- Eamonn Breen

Preceded by Wolfe Tones	All-Ireland Junior Club Football Champions; 2005	Succeeded by Ardfert
