= Eamonn Breen =

Kerry Gaelic footballer

Éamonn Breen
Personal information
- Born: 1969 or 1970 (age 56–57) Finuge, County Kerry

Sport
- Sport: Gaelic football
- Position: Half back
Club
- Years: Club
- 1980s–2000s: Finuge
Inter-county
Years	County	Apps (scores)
1990–1999	Kerry	25 (1–10)
Inter-county titles
- Munster titles: 3
- All-Irelands: 1
- NFL: 1
- All Stars: 1

Éamonn Breen (born 1969/1970) is a former Gaelic footballer from County Kerry. He was an All-Ireland medal and an All Star while playing at senior level for the Kerry county team in 1997. He also won an Under 21 All-Ireland in 1990. He played his club football for Finuge with which he won County Junior Championship Medals in 2002 and 2004. He added Munster medals in both those years and an All-Ireland in 2005.

He retired from inter-county football in mid-1999 and was reported to have departed for the United States. According to his father, Eddie, the decisive factor was the departure of a friend, Liam Flaherty, from the Kerry panel earlier that week.
