= Thomas Costello =

Thomas or Tom Costello may refer to:

- Tom Costello (music hall) (1863–1943), British music hall comedian and singer
- Tom Costello (jockey) (1866–?), American jockey
- Thomas W. Costello (born 1945), politician from Vermont in the United States
- Thomas Costello (hurler) (born 1978), Irish hurler from Tipperary
- Tom Costello (politician), Irish Labour Party politician, mayor of Galway, 2007–2008
- Tom Costello, CEO and founder of Cuil
- Tom Costello (journalist) (born 1963), NBC News journalist
- Thomas Moore Costello (1883–1954), lawyer, judge and political figure in Ontario
- Thomas Joseph Costello (1929–2019), American prelate of the Catholic Church
- Thomas Costello (bishop), Irish bishop

== See also ==
- Tom Costelloe (disambiguation)
