= Garry McMahon =

Irish Gaelic football player

Personal information
- Native name: Garraí Mac Mathúna (Irish)
- Born: 31 August 1937 Listowel, County Kerry
- Died: 5 March 2008 (aged 70)
- Occupation: Solicitor
- Height: 5 ft 10 in (178 cm)

Sport
- Sport: Gaelic football
- Position: Forward
Club
- Years: Club
- 1950s–1960s: Listowel Emmets
Inter-county
Years	County	Apps (scores)
1958–1962	Kerry	12 (7–06)
Inter-county titles
- Munster titles: 2
- All-Irelands: 2

Garry McMahon (31 August 1937 – 5 March 2008) was an Irish sportsperson. He played Gaelic football with his local club Listowel Emmets and was a member of the senior Kerry county team from the 1958 until 1962. For 58 years, from 1962 until 2020, McMahon held the record for scoring the fastest goal in the history of All-Ireland SFC finals, until Dean Rock knocked more than 20 seconds off it.

== Playing career ==
McMahon started playing football at a young age. In 1954, he helped St Michael's College to win the Dunloe Cup for the first time, which brought him to the attention of the Kerry minor team. He played for them in 1955, where they were beaten in the Munster Minor Football Championship final by Tipperary.

While attending college in Dublin, where he played for the Clan na nGael club in Raheny for two years, working his way up from the club's junior team to the senior team. Later, while training as a solicitor with his uncle in Cashel, County Tipperary, McMahon offered to play for Tipperary, but was denied, allegedly on the grounds of being part of the McMahon family from Fethard, who seemingly were not renowned Gaelic footballers.

McMahon played with the Kerry senior football team between 1959 and 1962, winning two All-Ireland medals in that time. His debut was against Cork in the 1959 Munster Senior Football Championship final, where he scored 2-2 in the first half, led match commentator Michael O'Hehir to say: "This morning, Garry McMahon was a son of a famous father, this evening Bryan McMahon is the father of a famous son". He was attributed with scoring the fastest goal ever in an All-Ireland SFC final - a fisted goal after 34 seconds against Roscommon, in what was the first live televised All-Ireland final in 1962. This record stood for 58 years, until 2020, when Dean Rock knocked more than 20 seconds off it.

== Post-playing days ==
Before his death on 5 March 2008, McMahon produced an album. The songs reflect his life reflections and he freely admits the influence of his late father.
