= Greencastle, County Tyrone =

Hamlet in County Tyrone, Northern Ireland

Coordinates: 54.689°N 7.079°W

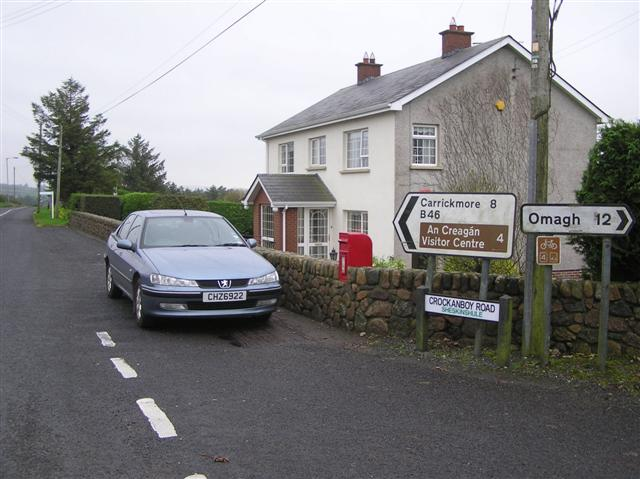
Crockanboy Road in Greencastle

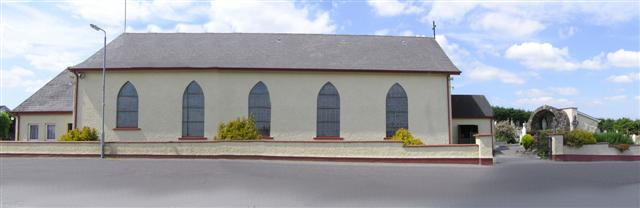
Roman Catholic church of Greencastle

Greencastle (from Irish An Caisleán Glas 'the green house') is a hamlet in County Tyrone, Northern Ireland. It is within the townland of Sheskinshule (from Irish Seisceann Siúil).

The village sits at a crossroads in the foothills of the Sperrin Mountains with the Owenkillew and Owenreagh rivers running nearby. It had a population of 202 people in the 2021 census.

In 2012, a Real IRA training camp was discovered in the hamlet, leading to four people jailed for terrorism offences in 2014.

== Sport ==
- An Caisleán Glas CLG made history by becoming the first club from Tyrone to win the All-Ireland Junior Club Title on Saturday 10 March 2007 in Croke Park, Dublin. They beat Duagh from Kerry 0-13 to 0-12 in an entertaining game played under floodlights.
- Speirín Óg made history by becoming the first ladies club from Tyrone to win the All-Ireland Junior Club Title on Sunday 20 November 2011 in St. Peregrine's, Dublin. The beat Aherlow from Tipperary 2-09 to 1-10 in an entertaining game, in front crowd of 700 supporters.
- St. Patricks, Greencastle
- In 2006 Our Lady of Lourdes Primary School in Greencastle launched a Cookery Book with recipes from Ireland's top GAA players, to mark the school's 25th Anniversary and raise funds for the Cormac McAnallen Trust. Those attending the launch included Mickey Harte (Tyrone manager), Stephen O'Neill (Tyrone player), Séan Kelly (former Gaelic Athletic Association President), Danny Murphy (Ulster GAA Secretary), Liam McNelis (secretary of The Cormac Trust), Steven McDonnell (Armagh GAA player), Paddy Crozier (former Derry GAA manager), Brian McIver (former Donegal GAA manager), Adrian Logan (former UTV sports presenter) and Austin O'Callaghan (BBC NI).

== See also ==
- List of towns and villages in Northern Ireland
