= Anthony Maher (Gaelic footballer) =

Kerry Gaelic footballer

Personal information
- Native name: Antaine Ó Meachair (Irish)
- Born: 29 August 1986 (age 40) Tralee, Ireland
- Occupation: Technical Supervisor
- Height: 1.96 m (6 ft 5 in)

Sport
- Sport: Gaelic football
- Position: Midfield
Club
- Years: Club
- 2003–: Duagh
Club titles
- Kerry titles: 2
Inter-county
Years	County	Apps (scores)
2006–2018	Kerry	25 (1–9)
Inter-county titles
- Munster titles: 5
- All-Irelands: 2
- NFL: 2
- All Stars: 1

Anthony Maher (born 28 August 1986) is a Gaelic football coach and player from Duagh, County Kerry. He plays for the Duagh club, the Feale Rangers divisional side and, formerly, at senior level for the Kerry county team.

== Playing career ==
=== Club ===
Maher won the 2006 Kerry Junior Football Championship with Duagh. The team emerged from Munster, and Maher's role was key as they reached the 2007 All-Ireland Junior Club Football Championship final. However, Greencastle GAA defeated them by one point. He set up a vital goal to help Feale Rangers win that year's Kerry Senior Football Championship as they beat South Kerry by a point in the final. Despite Maher's performance at midfield, Feale Rangers were knocked out of the 2008 Kerry Senior Football Championship quarter-final.

=== Underage ===
Maher played at underage level with Kerry. In 2004 he made his only appearance when in came on as a sub in the All-Ireland Minor Football semi final which Kerry beat Laois.

He later played with the Kerry Under 21 team. Again playing only one game, a draw with Cork. He played no part in the replay.

=== Junior ===
Maher played with the Kerry senior team during the 2008 National Football League, despite this later in the summer when was part of the county's junior side where he was made captain. Wins over Clare and Cork saw Maher lead his side to a Munster title, he also scored two points from midfield in the Munster final. Kerry later lost to Roscommon in the All-Ireland semi-final.

=== Senior ===
In 2008 he was selected in the Kerry senior panel and played in the National Football League, impressing at midfield. He started in 3 of Kerry's 7 league games and came on as a sub in further 2 games, including the final loss to Derry, and scored 2 points in the 2008 League. He played no part in the championship but was a member of the squad that reached the All-Ireland senior final.

In 2009 he played in all of Kerry's National Football League games, including starting at midfield in the final win over Derry in Croke Park. He again played no part of the championship, but was part of the panel that won that years All-Ireland title.

Following the retirement of Darragh Ó Sé in 2010 Maher looked set for more game time. He played his first championship game when he came as a sub in the Munster championship first round win over Tipperary. He again came on a sub, scoring a point, the Munster semi-final draw with Cork in Killarney. He started the re-play at Left Half Forward as Kerry won after extra time. He played in his first Munster final when Kerry faced Limerick. He started at midfield and won his first Munster senior title. He lost his place for the All-Ireland quarter-final. Coming on as a sub in a surprise loss to Down.

He missed Kerry's first championship game in 2011, but was back for the semi-final win over Limerick. He lined out in his second Munster when Kerry faced Cork. In the end, he won his second Munster medal. He was midfield as Kerry overcame Limerick in the All-Ireland Quarter-Final scoring his first championship point of the season. He was again midfield as Kerry easily accounted for Mayo in the All-Ireland semi-final. He later lined out in his first All-Ireland final as Kerry faced Dublin. Maher and co looked set for another All-Ireland title, before a Dublin came back seen them take the title.

Kerry failed to make the 2012 Munster final, and entered the qualifiers. Maher was at midfield for wins over Westmeath, Tyrone and Clare to return to the All-Ireland quarter final. It was a first championship meeting with Dongaal in Croke Park up next. Despite two points from Maher Kerry lost out by two points.

Maher won his third Munster title in 2013 after wins over Tipperary, Waterford, a game where he scored a goal, and Cork. He missed out on the All-Ireland quarter-final win over Cavan. He was back in the starting 15 for the semi-final with Dublin. In a game regarded as one of the all-time greats, Dublin won out 3–18 to 3-11.

Wins over Clare and Cork seen Maher win his fourth Munster title in five seasons. He later lined out as Galway were beaten. In the All-Ireland semi-final Kerry faced Mayo. The sides finished level so replay was needed. The replay played in Limerick is regarded as one of the games of the decade as extra time was needed, before Maher and co got over the line. Maher later lined out in his second All-Ireland final as Kerry faced Donegal. In a tight game Kerry came out on top and Maher won his second All-Ireland medal, and first on the field of play.

In 2015 Kerry overcame Tipperary to see Maher qualify for his fifth Munster final in six seasons, where he again came up against Cork. Kerry needed a replay to get over the line to give Maher his fifth Munster SFC medal. Wins over Kildare in the Quarter final and Tyrone in the semi-final saw Kerry back in the All-Ireland final where they faced Dublin. In a closely fought game it was Dublin who came out on top on a 0–12 to 0-09 scoreline. Despite the loss Maher ended the year by picking up an All-Star award.

In October 2018, Maher announced his retirement from inter-county football.

== Coaching career ==
In November 2022, Maher joined the Limerick footballers as a coach under the management of Ray Dempsey.
