= Duagh =

Village in County Kerry, Ireland

Duagh Dubháth
- Village
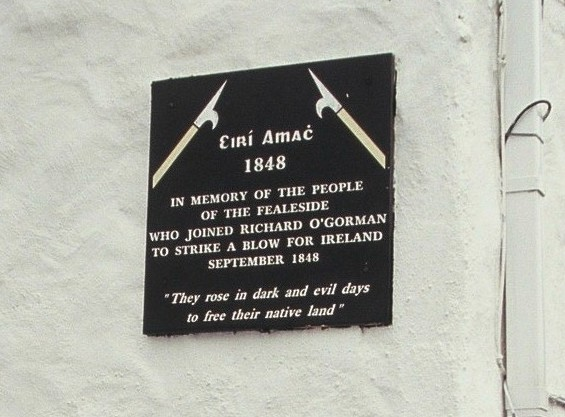
- Plaque in Duagh commemorating local involvement in the 1848 Young Ireland rebellion

- Location in Ireland
- Coordinates: 52°24′58″N 9°23′24″W
- Country: Ireland
- Province: Munster
- County: County Kerry

Population (2016)
  - Total: 222
- Time zone: UTC+0 (WET)
  - Summer (DST): UTC-1 (IST (WEST))
- Irish Grid Reference: R062305

Duagh (Irish: Dubháth, meaning 'black ford') is a village in County Kerry, Ireland, located approximately 7 km southeast of Listowel and 7 km northwest of Abbeyfeale on the R555 road. It is also a civil parish and townland.

Duagh is a dormitory village for Listowel and Abbeyfeale and a local service centre for the rural hinterland. There is one shop, three public houses, two housing estates, a hardware store and petrol station/shop which is located on the village's only street at the centre of the village. Social facilities include a church and heritage/community hall and a Gaelic Athletic Association club located at the centre of the village. The local primary school is also located in the village centre.

== Population ==
The population of the Duagh Electoral Division increased during the intercensal period 1996–2002. In 2002 the population was recorded as 469 persons (CSO). This equates to an increase of 4.5%. Preliminary figures for the 2006 census show this increase slowing to 3%.

In 1837 the village had a population of 210. As of the 2016 census, the village had 222 inhabitants.

== Education ==
St. Bridgid's National School opened in Duagh in 1971, to take the place of five smaller schools in the parish which were closed. The five schools closed were Duagh, Islandanny, Derrindaffe, Dromlegach and Knockalougha.

== Transport ==
Bus Éireann route 13, which operates between Limerick and Tralee several times a day, stops at Duagh. There is also a Local Link bus service on Fridays.

== Sport ==
The local Gaelic Athletic Association (GAA) club, Duagh GAA, owns a 5-acre (20,000 m^{2}) playing field in the village. The club's first county championship came in 2002 when they won the Kerry Novice Football Championship. In 2006, Duagh won the Kerry Junior Football Championship, and went on to win the Munster Junior Club Football Championship. Duagh then reached the All-Ireland Junior Club Football Championship final, but lost by a single point to Greencastle of County Tyrone in Croke Park. In 2024, Duagh again won the Kerry Junior Football Championship defeating Tarbert in the final. Duagh players who have formerly played with Kerry's senior county panel include Anthony Maher, Dan MacAuliffe and Kieran Quirke.

== Media ==
The village and its surrounding area were used as one of the filming locations for the Game of Thrones series. This included some of the wooded scenes from season 1 and 2.

== See also ==
- List of towns and villages in Ireland
