= Finuge =

Village in County Kerry, Ireland

Finuge Fionnúig
- Village
- Location in Ireland
- Coordinates: 52°25′N 9°32′W
- Country: Ireland
- Province: Munster
- County: County Kerry

Area
  - Total: 15 km^{2} (5.8 sq mi)
- Time zone: UTC+0 (WET)
  - Summer (DST): UTC-1 (IST (WEST))
- Irish Grid Reference: R746888

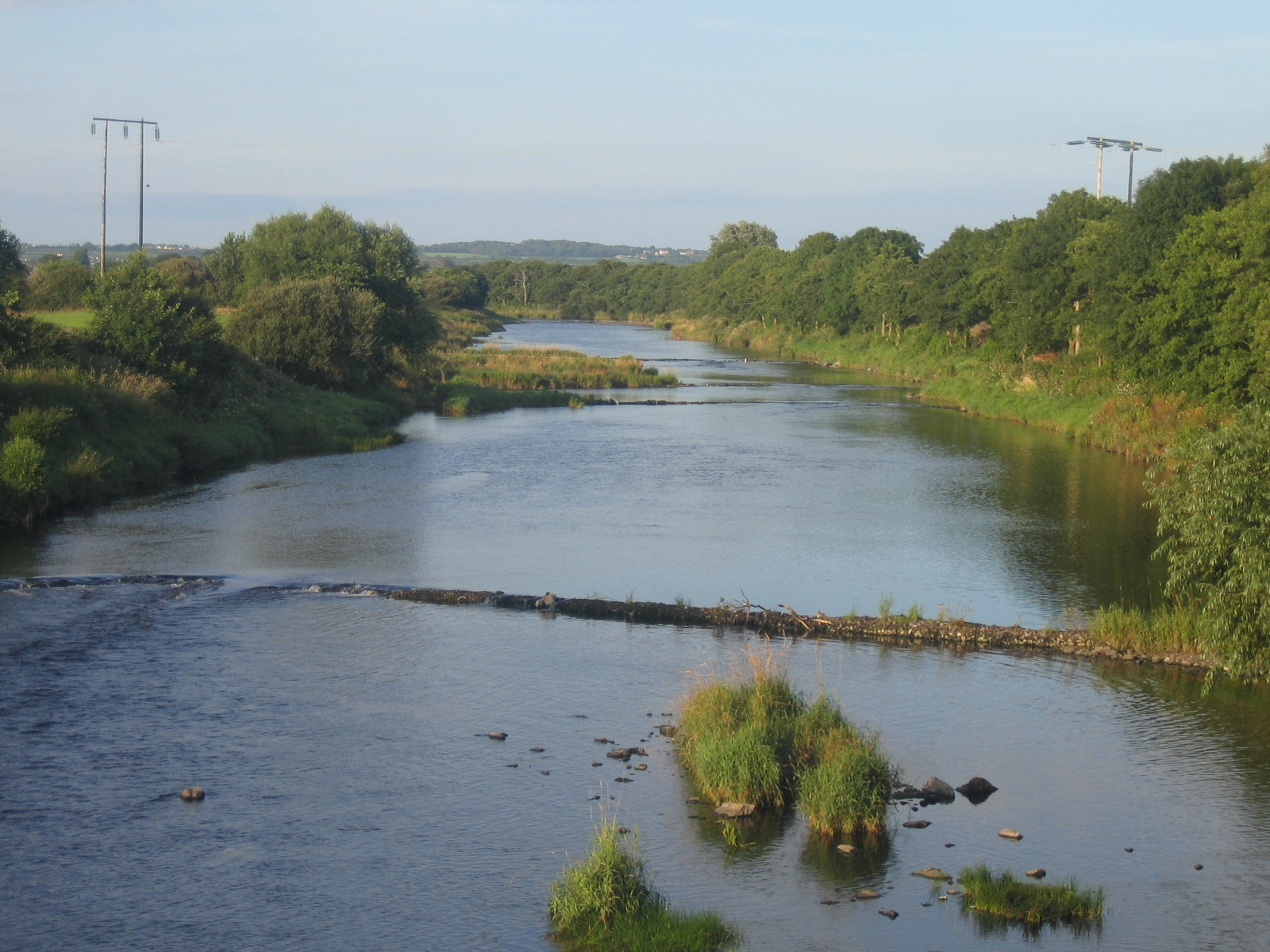
River Feale at Finuge Crossing

Finuge (Irish: Fionnúig) is a village near Listowel in County Kerry, Ireland. Finuge is a traditional Irish crossroads village with a shop, a pub, Teach Siamsa and a G.A.A. pitch. Sheehan's Thatched House located at Finuge Cross is regarded as one of the oldest surviving authentic thatched houses in Ireland. Conservation experts estimate it at least 300 years old.

The village's name is derived from Préachán, meaning crow.

Listowel is 4 kilometres (2.5 mi) to the north-east, and Tralee is 20 kilometres (12 mi) to the south-west.

== History ==
Around 1660, Finuge was planted by the Desmond Geraldines during the Cromwellian Plantation. At that time, Finuge village was situated near the bank of the River Feale. The land here was of excellent quality, so much so that the families were evicted and pushed south-east and re-located beside the "new road" that links Listowel and Lixnaw today.

About the time of the Fenian Rising, Lord Listowel decided that he wanted this land and his agent Major Homes planned to shift the whole village and evict the locals further south-east to the northwest of the townland of Irremore. The house plots were marked out and the eviction about to take place, when the Agent Holmes died unexpectedly and the village was saved.

There were three churches in Finuge at one time. In 1825 a new church was built at Irremore, it was renovated in 1961 and serves the people to the present day.

The big house in the district was Ennismore House, it became the property of the Desmond Geraldines as a result of the Cromwellian Plantation. In later times George Hewson inherited it from the last of the Fitzgeralds.

Finuge House, the ruins of which can be seen beside Finuge Bridge was owned by another Hewson family, not related to George. This family were always associated with "Harvest Home", an annual celebration at the end the harvest. The last record of such a gathering was 25 October 1877, when sixty men and women sat down to dinner.

Ringforts were features of the parish, with examples on the farms of Quinlans and McElligotts of Coolnaleen, Galvin's and Whelan's of Finuge.

Finuge is also the name of a civil parish that stretched from the townlands of Dysert to Ballinruddery. The townlands in the civil parish of Finuge including Bealkilla, Kilcrean, Knockamoohane, Ballinruddery, Garryantanavalla, Ballygrennan, Moyassa, Knockanassig and Grogeen.

== Geography ==
The village is located on the banks of the River Feale, 2 miles (3 km) from Listowel. The Finuge crossing is a bridge over the River Feale linking Finuge to Killocrim. It is in the Barony of Clanmaurice.

== Sport ==
The GAA club in the area is known as Finuge GAA or Finuge.

== People ==
- Sean McCarthy, a Finuge native, was an Irish folk songwriter.
- Paul Galvin is a Gaelic footballer with the Finuge club, Feale Rangers divisional side and Kerry county team.

== See also ==
- List of towns and villages in Ireland
