= John McGlynn (Gaelic footballer) =

Irish Gaelic footballer

Personal information
- Nickname: floppy
- Born: 13/05/72
- Occupation: Machinist
- Height: 5 ft 12 in (183 cm)

Sport
- Sport: Gaelic football
- Position: Half forward
Club
- Years: Club
- 1993-: Currow
Inter-county
Years	County	Apps (scores)
1998–2001	Kerry	4 (0-05)
Inter-county titles
- Munster titles: 0
- All-Irelands: 1
- All Stars: 0

John McGlynn is an Irish Gaelic footballer with the Currow club, the St. Kieran's divisional team and was a member of the Kerry county team. He first came on the Kerry senior scene in 1998 in the National League under the management of Páidí Ó Sé. McGlynn established himself as a regular for the 1999 League & Championship, despite winning the last 3 Munster Championships Kerry lost out to Cork in the final. He missed out on Kerry's All Ireland success in 2000. He played his last championship game in the 2001 semi final when Kerry were well beaten by Meath. He won an Munster 21 championship in 1996

At club level with Currow he won an O' Donoghue Cup in 1998 Currow's first win since 1945 and to date last win.

During his college days he played with the Tralee RTC and was part of the team that won the colleges first Sigerson Cup in 1997.
