= R555 road (Ireland) =

Road in Ireland

Coordinates: 52.389°N 9.309201°W

R555 road
- Bóthar R555

Route information
- Length: 14.9 km (9.3 mi)

Major junctions
- From: N69 Listowel
- Crosses River Smearla; Crosses River Feale and enters County Limerick
- To: R524 Abbeyfeale

Location
- Country: Ireland

Highway system
- Roads in Ireland; Motorways; Primary; Secondary; Regional

The R555 road is a regional road in Ireland, located in County Kerry and County Limerick.
