= Munster Junior Football Championship =

Gaelic football competition in Ireland

- Current season or competition: 2019 Munster Junior Football Championship
- Code: Gaelic Football
- Founded: 1910
- Region: Munster (GAA)
- No. of teams: 6
- Title holders: Kerry (46th title)
- Most titles: Kerry (46 titles)
- Official website: www.munster.gaa.ie

The Munster Junior Football Championship is a gaelic football tournament between the six counties of Munster: Cork, Kerry, Limerick, Tipperary, Clare and Waterford. It is the third-tier county teams playing off in a single-elimination tournament with 2 quarter finals instead of 4 (as of 2014). The cup was first given to the winners in 1957. Kerry have won the most titles, 42 in all. The winner will play against the champions of the other provinces in the All-Ireland Junior Football Championship.

== Teams ==
=== 2019 Championship ===
Six counties competed in the 2019 Munster Junior Football Championship:

| County | Location | Stadium | Championship Titles | Last Championship Title |
|---|---|---|---|---|
| Clare | Ennis | Cusack Park | 1 | 1925 |
| Cork | Cork | Páirc Uí Chaoimh | 29 | 2013 |
| Kerry | Tralee | Austin Stack Park | 46 | 2019 |
| Limerick | Limerick | Gaelic Grounds | 4 | 1950 |
| Tipperary | Thurles | Semple Stadium | 7 | 1998 |
| Waterford | Waterford | Walsh Park | 3 | 2004 |

=== Personnel and kits ===
| County | Manager | Captain(s) | Sponsors |
|---|---|---|---|
| Clare | | | Pat O’Donnell |
| Cork | | | Sports Direct |
| Kerry | | | Kerry Group |
| Limerick | | | None |
| Tipperary | | | Fiserv |
| Waterford | | | Cognizant |

== Roll of honour ==
| County | Titles | Runners-up | Years won | Years runners-up |
|---|---|---|---|---|
| Kerry | 46 | 12 | 1913, 1914, 1915, 1924, 1926, 1927, 1928, 1930, 1931, 1934, 1936, 1938, 1941, 1946, 1947, 1949, 1954, 1956, 1958, 1959, 1960, 1961, 1963, 1965, 1967, 1968, 1969, 1983, 1985, 1991, 1994, 1995, 1997, 2000, 2002, 2003, 2006, 2008, 2010, 2012, 2014, 2015, 2016, 2017, 2018, 2019 | 1932, 1933, 1939, 1951, 1952, 1972, 1984, 1989, 1990, 1996, 2005, 2011 |
| Cork | 29 | 26 | 1911, 1932, 1933, 1940, 1951, 1953, 1955, 1957, 1962, 1964, 1966, 1970, 1971, 1972, 1984, 1986, 1987, 1988, 1989, 1990, 1992, 1993, 1996, 2001, 2005, 2007, 2009, 2011, 2013 | 1912, 1916, 1923, 1925, 1931, 1935, 1946, 1950, 1954, 1959, 1960, 1961, 1967, 1983, 1995, 1998, 2003, 2004, 2006, 2008, 2014, 2015, 2016, 2017, 2018, 2019 |
| Tipperary | 7 | 13 | 1910, 1912, 1923, 1935, 1937, 1952, 1998 | 1926, 1940, 1941, 1953, 1969, 1970, 1985, 1986, 1987, 1988, 1993, 2001, 2002 |
| Limerick | 4 | 11 | 1916, 1929, 1939, 1950 | 1910, 1913, 1937, 1938, 1947, 1948, 1955, 1957, 1962, 1963, 2010 |
| Waterford | 3 | 11 | 1948, 1999, 2004 | 1911, 1914, 1915, 1928, 1934, 1936, 1949, 1956, 1958, 1991, 2013 |
| Clare | 1 | 17 | 1925 | 1924, 1927, 1929, 1930, 1964, 1965, 1966, 1968, 1971, 1992, 1994, 1997, 1999, 2000, 2007, 2009, 2012 |

== List of finals ==
=== Key ===
| All-Ireland champions |
| All-Ireland runners-up |

=== List of finals ===
| Year | Winners | | Runners-up | | Winning Captain |
| Year | County | Score | County | Score | Winning Captain |
|---|---|---|---|---|---|
| 1910 | Tipperary | 1–01 | Limerick | 0–00 | Tom Byrne |
| 1911 | Cork | 3–01 | Waterford | 3–00 | W. P. Aherne |
| 1912 | Tipperary | 0–05 | Cork | 0–02 | |
| 1913 | Kerry | 1–03, 1–04 (R) | Limerick | 1–02, 0–00 (R) | Jas O'Connell |
| 1914 | Kerry | 0–07 | Waterford | 0–00 | Dick Power |
| 1915 | Kerry | 2–03 | Waterford | 1–05 | T. King |
| 1916 | Limerick | 0–02 | Cork | 1–00 | Con Kiely |
| 1917–1922 | No championship | | | | |
| 1923 | Tipperary | 2–05 | Cork | 1–03 | Ned Cummins |
| 1924 | Kerry | 2–02 | Clare | 1–01 | J. McCarthy |
| 1925 | Clare | 0–06 | Cork | 0–05 | Tom Gillick |
| 1926 | Kerry | 1–05 | Tipperary | 2–01 | |
| 1927 | Kerry | 1–10 | Clare | 3–02 | |
| 1928 | Kerry | 3–02 | Waterford | 0–04 | |
| 1929 | Limerick | 2–06 | Clare | 0–03 | |
| 1930 | Kerry | 2–02 | Clare | 1–01 | J. O'Conner |
| 1931 | Kerry | 2–05 | Cork | 2–03 | |
| 1932 | Cork | 1–05 | Kerry | 1–03 | Dan Burke |
| 1933 | Cork | 2–02 | Kerry | 1–03 | |
| 1934 | Kerry | 2–12 | Waterford | 0–01 | |
| 1935 | Tipperary | 4–10 | Cork | 0–03 | Moss Savage |
| 1936 | Kerry | 4–14 | Waterford | 3–01 | |
| 1937 | Tipperary | 3–06 | Limerick | 0–06 | Jimmy Hickey |
| 1938 | Kerry | 2–04 | Limerick | 1–00 | |
| 1939 | Limerick | 1–07 | Kerry | 1–02 | |
| 1940 | Cork | 1–06 | Tipperary | 0–03 | |
| 1941 | Kerry | 1–10 | Tipperary | 0–03 | Tim Brosnan |
| 1942–1945 | No Championship | | | | |
| 1946 | Kerry | 3–03 | Cork | 1–07 | |
| 1947 | Kerry | 3–07 | Limerick | 3–05 | Teddy O'Sullivan |
| 1948 | Waterford | 2–08 | Limerick | 1–07 | Paddy Hayes |
| 1949 | Kerry | 2–05 | Waterford | 0–06 | Tom Long |
| 1950 | Limerick | 3–06 | Cork | 1–06 | Joe O'Leary |
| 1951 | Cork | 3–06 | Kerry | 1–04 | J.J. Henchion |
| 1952 | Tipperary | 0–15, 0–08 (R) | Kerry | 2–09, 0–06 (R) | Dick Dunne |
| 1953 | Cork | 1–10 | Tipperary | 0–10 | Jack Lyons |
| 1954 | Kerry | 1–09 | Cork | 2–02 | John Walla O'Conner |
| 1955 | Cork | 3–07 | Limerick | 0–05 | Owen McAuliffe |
| 1956 | Kerry | 4–10 | Waterford | 1–04 | |
| 1957 | Cork | 1–07 | Limerick | 0–07 | Owen McAuliffe |
| 1958 | Kerry | 3–11 | Waterford | 2–04 | |
| 1959 | Kerry | 3–08 | Cork | 0–06 | |
| 1960 | Kerry | 2–06 | Cork | 1–08 | |
| 1961 | Kerry | 2–04 | Cork | 0–06 | |
| 1962 | Cork | 3–06 | Limerick | 0–08 | |
| 1963 | Kerry | 2–04 | Limerick | 0–06 | Harry Burke |
| 1964 | Cork | 2–05 | Clare | 1–04 | Connie Kelleher |
| 1965 | Kerry | 3–13 | Clare | 0–06 | |
| 1966 | Cork | 1–07 | Clare | 0–07 | |
| 1967 | Kerry | 2–07 | Cork | 0–09 | Pat Aherne |
| 1968 | Kerry | 3–11 | Clare | 2–06 | |
| 1969 | Kerry | 1–11 | Tipperary | 1–05 | |
| 1970 | Cork | 2–10 | Tipperary | 2–09 | |
| 1971 | Cork | 2–07 | Clare | 1–05 | Bertie O'Brien |
| 1972 | Cork | 2–13 | Kerry | 0–09 | |
| 1973–1982 | No Championship | | | | |
| 1983 | Kerry | 2–10 | Cork | 0–09 | |
| 1984 | Cork | 1–12 | Kerry | 0–09 | John O'Sullivan |
| 1985 | Kerry | 1–05 (R) | Tipperary | 1–04 (R) | |
| 1986 | Cork | 1–12 | Tipperary | 1–06 | |
| 1987 | Cork | 1–12 | Tipperary | 1–05 | Martin Kelleher |
| 1988 | Cork | | Tipperary | | Paul O'Callaghan |
| 1989 | Cork | 0–10 | Kerry | 0–09 | Pat Kenneally |
| 1990 | Cork | 1–09 | Kerry | 1–06 | Joe Collins |
| 1991 | Kerry | 1–12 | Waterford | 3–04 | Teddy Harrington |
| 1992 | Cork | 0–13 | Clare | 1–09 | Niall O'Conner |
| 1993 | Cork | 1–10 | Tipperary | 0–09 | Ronan Sheehan |
| 1994 | Kerry | 1–06 | Clare | 0–08 | Michael Keating |
| 1995 | Kerry | 1–21 AET | Cork | 0–19 | Garry McGrath |
| 1996 | Cork | 1–10 | Kerry | 1–08 | Kieran Creed |
| 1997 | Kerry | 1–15 | Clare | 0–09 | |
| 1998 | Tipperary | 0–06 | Cork | 0–05 | Kevin Coonan |
| 1999 | Waterford | 0–09 | Clare | 0–07 | Alfie Kirwan |
| 2000 | Kerry | 1–15 | Clare | 0–06 | Denis Moynihan |
| 2001 | Cork | 0–17 | Tipperary | 0–11 | Paul Mackey |
| 2002 | Kerry | 2–14 | Tipperary | 0–15 | Austin Constable |
| 2003 | Kerry | 2–09 | Cork | 0–14 | Brian Scanlon |
| 2004 | Waterford | 1–07 | Cork | 0–09 | Michael Byrne |
| 2005 | Cork | 2–13 | Kerry | 0–08 | |
| 2006 | Kerry | 0–12 | Cork | 0–08 | Sean Hegarty |
| 2007 | Cork | 0–12 | Clare | 0–11 | Barry Gogan |
| 2008 | Kerry | 1–11 | Cork | 1–09 | Anthony Maher |
| 2009 | Cork | 1–21 | Clare | 0–13 | |
| 2010 | Kerry | 3–12 | Limerick | 1–06 | Michael O'Donoghue |
| 2011 | Cork | 0–10 | Kerry | 1–05 | |
| 2012 | Kerry | 3–18 | Clare | 3–07 | Marcus Mangan |
| 2013 | Cork | 1–18 | Waterford | 0–09 | Ruairí Deane |
| 2014 | Kerry | 3–14 | Cork | 0–13 | Thomas Hickey |
| 2015 | Kerry | 1–20 | Cork | 0–11 | Alan O' Donughue |
| 2016 | Kerry | 0–14 | Cork | 0–13 | Paul O' Donoghue |
| 2017 | Kerry | 4–24 | Cork | 3–20 | Killian Spillane |
| 2018 | Kerry | 2–14 | Cork | 1–15 | Kieran Murphy |
| 2019 | Kerry | 1–14 | Cork | 0–13 | |
| 2020–present | No championship due to COVID-19 | | | | |

- 1913 Replay ordered after an objection
- 1916 Limerick awarded title on an objection after Cork had won the final 1–0 to 0–2

== See also ==
- Munster Senior Football Championship
- All-Ireland Junior Football Championship
  - Connacht Junior Football Championship
  - Leinster Junior Football Championship
  - Ulster Junior Football Championship
