= Noel Kennelly =

Kerry Gaelic footballer

Personal information
- Native name: Nollaig Mac an Fhailí (Irish)
- Born: 25 December 1979 (age 46) Listowel, County Kerry

Sport
- Sport: Gaelic football
- Position: Half forward
Club
Years	Club	Apps (scores)
1990's-2000's	Listowel Emmets	500+ (99-999)
Club titles
- Kerry titles: 1
Inter-county*
Years	County	Apps (scores)
1998-2002	Kerry	20 (1-48)
Inter-county titles
- Munster titles: 3
- All-Irelands: 1
- All Stars: 1
- *Inter County team apps and scores correct as of November 2009.

Noel Kennelly is a footballer from the Listowel Emmets club in North Kerry. He is a son of former Kerry great Tim Kennelly and older brother of Tadhg Kennelly. He won an All-Ireland SFC medal with Kerry in 2000. He won an All-Ireland Under 21 medal in 1998 and played in the losing final of 1999, he also played in the losing All-Ireland Minor final in 1996.

== Honours ==
Inter-county

- All-Ireland Senior Championship 1: 2000
- All-Ireland U21 Championship 1: 1998
- Munster Senior Championship 3: 1998, 2000, 2001
- Munster Minor Championship 2: 1996, 1997
- Munster U21 Championship 3: 1997, 1998, 1999

Club

- Kerry Senior Football Championship 1: 2007
- Kerry Under-21 Football Championship 2: 1997, 1998
- Kerry Intermediate Football Championship 1: 2002
- Kerry Junior Football Championship 1: 1999
- North Kerry Senior Championship 7: 1997, 1998, 2004, 2008, 2009, 2013, 2015

College

- Sigerson Cup 1: 1999
