= Listowel Emmets GAA =

Gaelic games club in County Kerry, Ireland

Listowel Emmets
- Craobh Cumann Emmet Lios Tuathail
- Founded: 1885
- County: Kerry
- Colours: Black and Amber
- Grounds: Frank Sheehy Park
- Coordinates: 52°26′50.67″N 9°28′34.65″W

Playing kits
Standard colours

Listowel Emmets is a Gaelic Athletic Association club based in Listowel, County Kerry, Ireland. They play in Division 2 of the County Football league and in the Kerry Intermediate Football Championship. Players from the club also compete in the Kerry Senior Football Championship with the divisional side Feale Rangers, and since 2025 North Kerry. Notable players from the club include Tim Kennelly, and his 2 sons Tadhg Kennelly and Noel Kennelly.

The club was founded in 1885, and was a founder member of the North Kerry Football Board in 1924. They have competed in every North Kerry Senior Football Championship since reaching the first final in 1925 and have won the championship a record 19 times.

== Honours ==
- Kerry Intermediate Football Championship: (1) 2002, Runners-Up 2007
- Kerry Premier Junior Football Championship: (1) 2023
- Kerry Junior Football Championship (2) 1972, 1999
- Munster Junior Club Football Championship (1) 2023
- North Kerry Senior Football Championship: (19) 1926, 1931, 1933, 1957, 1965, 1972, 1976, 1991, 1997, 1998, 2004, 2008, 2009, 2013 2015, 2022, 2024, 2025, 2026

== Notable players ==
- Tim Kennelly Five time All-Ireland Senior Football Championship winner. 1979 All-Ireland Senior Football Championship winning captain. Two time All-Star.
- Tadhg Kennelly 2009 All-Ireland Senior Football Championship and All-Star winner. 2005 AFL Grand Final winner with Sydney Swans.
- Noel Kennelly All-Ireland Under-21 Football Championship 1998. Sigerson Cup 1999. 2000 All-Ireland Senior Football Championship winner.
- Stephen Stack Two time All-Ireland Senior Football Championship winner.
- Garry McMahon Two time All-Ireland Senior Football Championship winner. Held the record for scoring the fastest goal in an All-Ireland final from 1962 until 2020.
- Brendan Guiney Two time All-Ireland Senior Football Championship winner.
- Brian Scanlon 1998 All-Ireland Under 21 Championship winning captain.
- Sean Wight Australian rules footballer with Melbourne Football Club.
- Ger McCarthy All-Ireland Under-21 Football Championship 2008.
- Brian McGuire Munster SFC 2011.
- Conor Cox All-Ireland Junior Football Championship 2012, 2015, 2017. Sigerson Cup 2014. Connacht SFC 2019.
- Jack McGuire All-Ireland Junior Football Championship 2015 & 2017. Sigerson Cup 2014.
- Bryan Sweeney All-Ireland Minor Football Championship 2015 & 2016.
- Niall Collins All-Ireland Minor Football Championship 2016.
- Eddie Browne All-Ireland Minor Football Championship 2017.
