= St Patrick's, Greencastle GAC =

Tyrone-based Gaelic games club

St Patrick's, Greencastle
- Naomh Pádraig, An Caisleán Glas
- Founded: 1932
- County: Tyrone
- Nickname: The Castle; The Hoops
- Colours: Green and White
- Coordinates: 54°41′50.95″N 7°03′51.03″W

Playing kits
Standard colours

St Patrick's, Greencastle (Irish: Naomh Pádraig, An Caisleán Glas) are a Gaelic football Club from Greencastle, County Tyrone, Northern Ireland. The club was founded in 1932, under the name Greencastle Erin's Hope.

Greencastle were Tyrone GAA Division 3 and Junior football champions of 2006. They were also Ulster Junior Club Football Championship winners of 2006. They also went on to win the All-Ireland Junior Club Football Championship in 2007.

Greencastle's manager is Seán Teague, former Tyrone senior football team captain.

Greencastle is one of only three clubs in Tyrone to win an All-Ireland Championship.

== Honours ==
Senior Men

- Tyrone Junior Football Championship: (4)
  - 1936, 1992, 1998, 2006
- Ulster Junior Club Football Championship: (1)
  - 2006
- All-Ireland Junior Club Football Championship: (1)
  - 2007
- Tyrone All-County League Division 2: (3)
  - 2002, 2009, 2021
- Tyrone All-County League Division 3: (1)
  - 1934, 2006

Reserve

- Tyrone Division 2 Reserve Football League (3) 2003, 2004, 2019
- Tyrone Division 2 Reserve Football Championship (3) 2004, 2018, 2019
- Tyrone Division 3 Reserve Football League (1) 2006

U-21

- Tyrone Under-21 Grade 2 Football Championship (2) 2008, 2009, 2013

Minor

- Tyrone Minor Grade 2 Football Championship (1) 1990
- Tyrone Minor Grade 2 Football League (1) 1990
- Tyrone Minor Grade 3 Football Championship (3) 1991, 1994, 2016
- Tyrone Minor Grade 3 Football League (2) 1999, 2016
