= Ponsonby (surname) =

Ponsonby is a surname, and may refer to:

- Anne Ponsonby (1924–2023), British telegraphist
- Arthur Ponsonby, 1st Baron Ponsonby of Shulbrede (1871–1946), British politician, writer and social activist
- Arthur Ponsonby, 11th Earl of Bessborough (1912–2002), British peer
- Ashley Ponsonby (1831–1898), British politician
- Bernard Ponsonby, Scottish broadcast journalist
- Brabazon Ponsonby, 1st Earl of Bessborough (1679–1758), British politician and peer
- Lady Caroline Ponsonby (1785–1828), married name Lady Caroline Lamb, novelist and lover of Lord Byron
- Cecil Ponsonby (1889–1945), English cricketer
- Chambré Brabazon Ponsonby (c.1720–1762), Irish Member of Parliament
- Chambré Brabazon Ponsonby-Barker (1762–1834), Irish Member of Parliament
- Charles Ponsonby, 2nd Baron de Mauley of Canford (1815–1896), British peer and politician
- Sir Charles Ponsonby, 1st Baronet (1879–1976), British politician
- Dorothea Ponsonby (1876–1963), English writer
- Edward Ponsonby, 2nd Baron Sysonby (1903–1956), British peer and soldier
- Edward Ponsonby, 8th Earl of Bessborough (1851–1920), British peer
- Elizabeth Ponsonby (1900–1940), a Bright Young Thing in the 1920s, daughter of Arthur Ponsonby, 1st Baron Ponsonby of Shulbrede
- Emily Ponsonby (1817–1877), English novelist
- Frederick Ponsonby (British Army officer) (1783–1837), British soldier
- Frederick Ponsonby, 1st Baron Sysonby (1867–1935), British soldier and courtier
- Frederick Ponsonby, 4th Baron Ponsonby of Shulbrede (born 1958), British peer and politician
- Frederick Ponsonby, 3rd Earl of Bessborough (1758–1844), British peer
- Frederick Ponsonby, 6th Earl of Bessborough (1815–1895), British peer, founder of Surrey County Cricket Club and I Zingari
- Frederick Ponsonby, 10th Earl of Bessborough (1913–1993), British peer, diplomat and politician
- George Ponsonby (1755–1817), Lord Chancellor of Ireland
- George Ponsonby (Junior Lord of the Treasury) (1773–1863), Irish politician
- Georgia Ponsonby (born 1999), New Zealand rugby union footballer
- Henrietta Ponsonby, Countess of Bessborough (1761–1821), wife of Frederick Ponsonby, 3rd Earl of Bessborough, mother of Lady Caroline Lamb
- Henry Ponsonby (1825–1895), British soldier and courtier
- Henry Ponsonby (died 1681), English soldier and settler in County Kerry, brother of Colonel John Ponsonby
- Henry Ponsonby (died 1745) (1685–1745), Irish soldier
- Jack Ponsonby (1874–1962), Irish footballer
- Jack Talbot-Ponsonby (1907–1969), British equestrian
- James Carrique Ponsonby (1738–1796), Irish Member of Parliament
- John Ponsonby (British Army officer) (1866–1952), commanded 5th Division during World War I
- John Ponsonby (colonel) (1608–1678), English officer in Oliver Cromwell's army during the Irish Confederate Wars
- John Ponsonby (politician) (1713–1789), Speaker of the Irish House of Commons
- John Ponsonby (RAF officer) (1955–2022), British Air Vice-Marshal
- John Ponsonby, 4th Earl of Bessborough (1781–1847), British politician and Lord Lieutenant of Ireland
- John Ponsonby, 5th Earl of Bessborough (1809–1880), British peer and politician
- John Ponsonby, 1st Viscount Ponsonby, (c.1770–1855), British diplomat, politician and peer
- John Ponsonby-Fane (1848–1916), English malacologist and cricketer
- Loelia Ponsonby, married name Loelia Lindsay (1902–1993), British peeress, needlewoman and magazine editor
- Madeleine Ponsonby, Countess of Bessborough (born 1935), British art dealer
- Maria Ponsonby, Viscountess Duncannon (1787–1834), English noblewoman
- Matthew Ponsonby, 2nd Baron Ponsonby of Shulbrede (1904–1976), British peer
- Maurice Ponsonby (1880–1943), English Anglican cleric, Dean of Johannesburg
- Myles Ponsonby (1924–1999), British soldier, intelligence officer, diplomat and politician
- Richard Ponsonby (bishop) (1722–1815), Church of Ireland bishop
- Richard Ponsonby (politician) (c.1678–1763), Irish Member of Parliament
- Richard Ponsonby-Fane (1878–1937), British Japanologist
- Robert Ponsonby (1926–2019), English arts administrator
- Roberte Ponsonby, Countess of Bessborough (1892–1979), daughter of Baron Jean de Neuflize
- Rupert Ponsonby, 7th Baron de Mauley (born 1957), British peer and politician
- Spencer Ponsonby-Fane (1824–1915), English diplomat, civil servant, courtier and cricketer
- Thomas Ponsonby (captain) (1660–1717), Irish army officer and landowner
- Thomas Ponsonby, 3rd Baron Ponsonby of Shulbrede (1930–1990), British politician
- Vere Ponsonby, 9th Earl of Bessborough (1880–1956), Anglo-Irish politician, Governor General of Canada
- Victoria Ponsonby, Baroness Sysonby (1874–1955), British cookbook author
- Walter Ponsonby, 7th Earl of Bessborough (1821–1906), British peer and Anglican priest
- William Ponsonby (British Army officer) (1772–1815), Irish politician and soldier
- William Ponsonby (publisher) (died 1604), London publisher of the Elizabethan era
- William Ponsonby, 1st Baron Ponsonby (1744–1806), Irish politician
- William Ponsonby, 1st Baron de Mauley (1787–1855), British peer and politician
- William Ponsonby, 2nd Earl of Bessborough (1704–1793), Anglo-Irish politician and public servant
- William Ponsonby, 1st Viscount Duncannon (1659–1724), Anglo-Irish peer
