= Special Representative of the Secretary-General for Western Sahara =

A special representative of the secretary-general for Western Sahara (SRSG) was appointed by the secretary-general to lead the United Nations Mission for the Referendum in Western Sahara (MINURSO).

== List of special representatives ==
#	Name	Born-Died	Took office	Left office	Country
1	Héctor Gros Espiell	1926–2009	20 September 1988	19 January 1990	Uruguay
2	Johannes J. Manz	1939-	19 January 1990	20 December 1991	Switzerland
3	Sahabzada Yaqub Khan	1920–	23 March 1992	August 1995	Pakistan
4	Erik Jensen (Acting)		August 1995	February 1998	Malaysia
5	Charles Franklin Dunbar	1937–	February 1998	31 March 1999	United States
6	Robin Kinloch (Acting)	1937	1 April 1999	18 May 1999	United Kingdom
7	William L. Eagleton	1926–2011	18 May 1999	1 December 2001	United States
8	William L. Swing	1934–	1 December 2001	1 July 2003	United States
9	Alvaro de Soto	1943–	7 August 2003	5 August 2005	Peru
10	Francesco Bastagli		5 August 2005	31 August 2006	Italy
11	Julian Harston	1942–	5 February 2007	12 October 2009	United Kingdom
12	Hany Abdel-Aziz	1946–	12 October 2009	15 June 2012	Egypt
13	Wolfgang Weisbrod-Weber	1955–	15 June 2012	31 July 2014	Germany
14	Kim Bolduc	1952–	31 July 2014	22 November 2017	Canada
15	Colin Stewart	1961-	1 December 2017	27 August 2021	Canada
16	Alexander Ivanko		27 August 2021	31 October 2026	Russia

== Controversy ==
At least two Special Representatives (Johannes Manz and Francesco Bastagli) had resigned from their post in protest against Moroccan political manoeuvres.

== See also ==
- Special Representative of the Secretary-General
- United Nations Mission for the Referendum in Western Sahara
