= John Ponsonby =

John Ponsonby may refer to:

- John Ponsonby (politician) (1713–1789), Irish politician
- John Ponsonby, 1st Viscount Ponsonby (c. 1772 – 1855), British diplomat
- John Ponsonby, 4th Earl of Bessborough (1781–1847), English politician
- John Ponsonby, 5th Earl of Bessborough (1809–1880), British politician
- John Ponsonby (British Army officer) (1866–1952), British general
- John Ponsonby (RAF officer) (1955–2022), senior commander in the Royal Air Force
- John Ponsonby (colonel) (1608–1678), colonel in Oliver Cromwell's army and member of parliament
