= Ponsonby =

Ponsonby may refer to:

== Surname ==
- Ponsonby (surname)

== Noble titles ==
- Earl of Bessborough
- Viscount and Baron Ponsonby of Imokilly
- Baron de Mauley
- Baron Ponsonby of Shulbrede
- Baron Sysonby

== Given name ==
- Charles Garrett Ponsonby Moore, 11th Earl of Drogheda, 11th Earl of Drogheda KG, KBE (1910–1989), British peer
- Henry Dermot Ponsonby Moore, 12th Earl of Drogheda (born 1937), British photographer known professionally as Derry Moore
- Maurice Arthur Ponsonby Wood (1916–2007), Anglican bishop in the Evangelical tradition
- Nicholas Hickman Ponsonby Bacon (born 1953), British landowner, businessman and philanthropist
- Ponsonby Ogle (1855–1902), British writer and journalist
- Robert Ponsonby Staples (1853–1943), 11th Baronet of Lissan House near Cookstown in Co. Tyrone
- Robert Ponsonby Tottenham Loftus, Irish Anglican Bishop in the first half of the 19th century
- Rowland Ponsonby Blennerhassett (1850–1913), Irish politician
- Stephen Ponsonby Peacocke (1813–1872), British officer of the Bombay Army and an artist

== Places ==
- Ponsonby, Cumbria, England
- Ponsonby Fell, hill in the west of the English Lake District, near Gosforth, Cumbria
- Ponsonby, New Zealand, a central suburb of Auckland
- Ponsonby (New Zealand electorate), historical parliamentary electorate in Auckland, New Zealand from 1887 to 1890 and from 1946 to 1963
- Ponsonby, Quebec, Canada – renamed to Boileau in 1993
- Ponsonby, Ontario, ghost town in Ontario, Canada

== Other ==
- Reginald Ponsonby-Smythe, Commander of Majestic-16 in Destroy All Humans! 2
- Ponsonby AFC, former New Zealand football club, now amalgamated to form Mount Albert-Ponsonby
- Ponsonby Ponies, rugby league club based in Ponsonby, New Zealand
- Ponsonby RFC, rugby union club based in Auckland, New Zealand
- Mr Ponsonby, the fourth novel by New Zealand author Ian Middleton
- Ponsonby Britt, the fictional executive producer of TV series including The Rocky and Bullwinkle Show
- Ponsonby Rule, constitutional convention in the UK constitutional law involving 21 days' notice for international treaties
- Ponsonby's Column, a former monumental column in Valletta, Malta
- Percy Ponsonby, a 1939 BBC television comedy programme
