= Glanballyma, County Kerry =

Glanballyma Irish: Gleann Baile Má
- townland
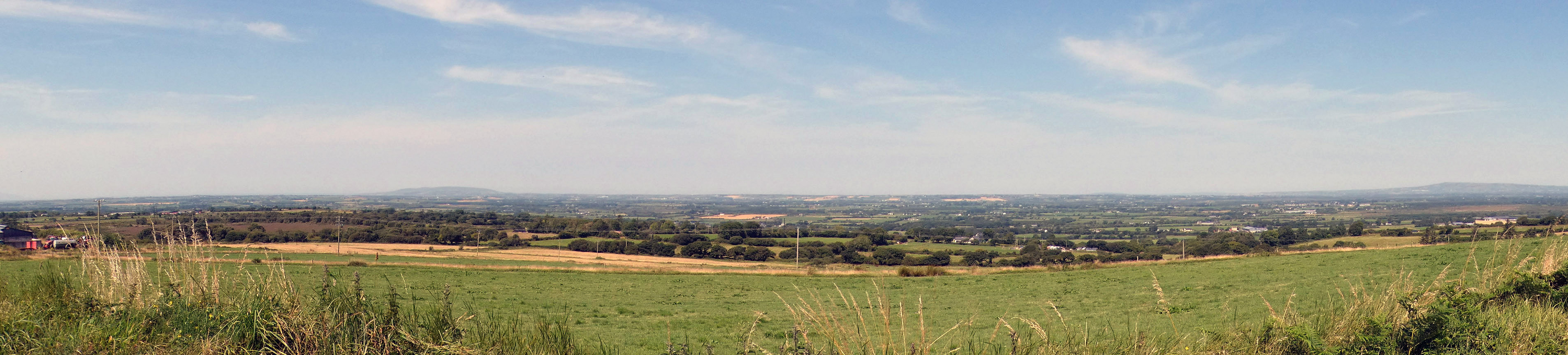

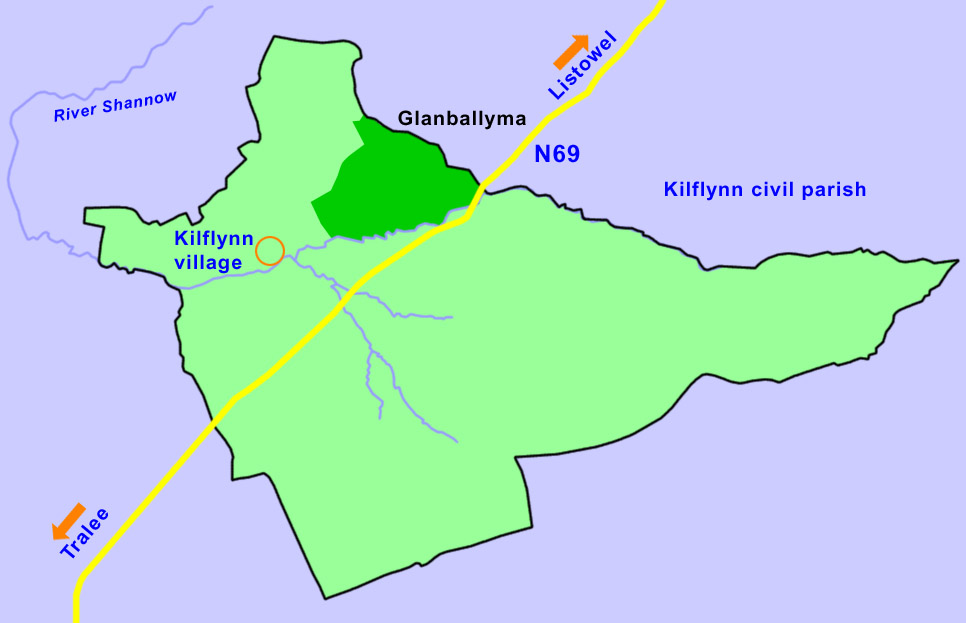

- Glanballyma shown within Ireland
- Coordinates: 52°21′26″N 9°36′15″W
- Country: Ireland
- County: County Kerry
- Barony: Clanmaurice
- Civil parish: Kilflynn

Glanballyma, (Irish:Gleann Baile Má) is a townland of County Kerry, Ireland.

It is one of the sixteen original townlands of the civil parish of Kilflynn. Its southern border is formed by the river Shannow. The area covers 169.29 hectares (418.32 acres) of rural land.

== Archaeology and history ==
Glanballyma contains thirteen archaeological sites that are recognised as National Monuments: three are enclosures (Universal Transverse Mercator grid references): (29U 489880 623939, 29U 490676 624328, 29U 490996 623960); five are ringforts (29U 490346 624251, 29U 490496 623918, 29U 490589 623928 (on the 6-inch Ordnance Survey (OS) map of 1841 marked as a 'cave' so possibly a souterrain remnant, then on the 25-inch OS map of 1892 as an oval area), 29U 490637 623762 (on the 25-inch OS map of 1892, mostly levelled in the 1950s), 29U 491018 624468); one is listed as a fulacht fiadh (a burnt mound) (29U 490200 623558); one is a kiln (29U 490481 623942 (on the 25-inch OS map of 1892 as a disused lime kiln, and noted possibly as a quarry/metalworks in 1938)); one is a standing stone (29U 490354 623680 (the tale is that Finn McCool threw it here from the top of a nearby hill)); one is a souterrain (29U 490327 624241 (evidenced in 1985 as a long, narrow collapsed depression)); one is listed as a burnt mound (29U 490885 624050 (a low rise in the ground with heat-shattered rocks)). Lime kilns are common to the area for agriculture to counter acidic soils, souterrains are associated with the Iron Age and some nearby metalworks date back to the Bronze Age.

Thomas Stack, of the Stack family which had its seat at Crotta, owned Glanballyma and neighbouring townlands. Because of their support for the Irish Rebellion of 1641 and the Catholic Confederation, the Stacks' land was declared forfeit following the Act for the Settlement of Ireland in 1652. After the Act of Settlement of 1662, Glanballyma was granted to Henry Ponsonby in 1666. Ponsonby was a soldier, in Oliver Cromwell's New Model Army, one of many rewarded with Irish land for service or in lieu of wages.

== Representation ==
Glanballyma is in the Roman Catholic parish of Abbeydorney, whose priest is the Very Reverend Denis O’Mahony and who takes services at Abbeydorney and Kilflynn.

The townland is in the parliamentary constituency of Kerry (since 2016), returning five Teachtaí Dála (TDs) to Dáil Éireann.

== See also ==
- Civil parishes in Ireland
- Kilflynn
