= Hany Abdel-Aziz =

Special Representative for Western Sahara of the United Nations (born 1946)

Hany Abdel-Aziz (Arabic: هاني عبد العزيز ), (born in Cairo, Egypt in 1946) was the Special Representative for Western Sahara of the United Nations and the Head of the United Nations Mission for the Referendum in Western Sahara (MINURSO) between 2009 and 2012.

== Career ==
Hany graduated from the Egyptian Military College in 1964, and received an advanced degree in Economics from the Cairo University in 1975. He started off as an Arabic interpreter in Geneva in 1981, and went on to serve in peacekeeping missions at Democratic Republic of Congo, Sudan, Central African Republic, Lebanon, Iraq, Bosnia and Herzegovina and Burundi, primarily in administrative roles. He was in charge of recruiting private forces to help set up and assist the newly formed United Nations Mission in the Central African Republic and Chad in 2007. He then served as the director of Mission Support at the United Nations Mission in the Democratic Republic of Congo.

He was appointed as the Special Representative for MINURSO on 12 October 2009 by United Nations Secretary-General Ban Ki-moon. He succeeded United Kingdom Diplomatic Services officer Julian Harston, who was made the Director of the UN Office in Belgrade. He along with Christopher W.S. Ross, Secretary-General's Personal Envoy for Western Sahara were instrumental in re-uniting about 13000 people who were displaced to different refugee camps as a result of the conflict. He completed his assignment on 30 April 2012 and was replaced by Wolfgang Weisbrod-Weber.

There were allegations that the criticisms of Morocco's role in the 2011 Western Saharan protests, in a report that he sent to the UN Department of Peacekeeping Operations, were added on later.
