= Thomas Ponsonby =

Thomas Ponsonby may refer to:

- Thomas Ponsonby, 3rd Baron Ponsonby of Shulbrede, British hereditary peer and politician
- Thomas Ponsonby (captain), Irish army captain and landowner
