= Richard Ponsonby =

Richard Ponsonby may refer to:

- Richard Ponsonby (bishop) (1722–1815), Church of Ireland bishop
- Richard Ponsonby (politician) (c.1678–1763), Irish Member of Parliament

== See also ==
- Richard Ponsonby-Fane, British academic and author
