= Brian Stewart (diplomat) =

Scottish diplomat

Brian Stewart CMG

Director Support Services, Assistant Chief of the Secret Intelligence Service
- In office 1974–1979
- Prime Minister: James Callaghan

Head of Hong Kong Station
- In office 1972–1974
- Prime Minister: Edward Heath

Secretary to the Joint Intelligence Committee
- In office 1969–1972
- Prime Minister: Harold Wilson; Edward Heath
- Preceded by: Brooks Richards
- Succeeded by: Michael Herman

Consul-General and British Representative to North Vietnam
- In office 1967–1969
- Prime Minister: Harold Wilson
- Preceded by: John Colvin
- Succeeded by: Gordon Philo

First Secretary Manila
- In office 1967–1967
- Prime Minister: Harold Wilson

First Secretary Kuala Lumpur
- In office 1964–1967
- Prime Minister: Alec Douglas-Home; Harold Wilson

Consul-General of the United Kingdom in Shanghai
- In office July 1962 – February 1964
- Prime Minister: Alec Douglas-Home
- Preceded by: Frank Chatterton Butler
- Succeeded by: Douglas Spankie

2nd Secretary Rangoon
- In office 1957–1960
- Prime Minister: Harold Macmillan

Secretary for Chinese Affairs Malacca
- In office 1955–1957
- Prime Minister: Harold Macmillan

Personal details
- Born: Brian Thomas Webster Stewart; 27 April 1922 Edinburgh, Scotland
- Died: 16 August 2015 (aged 93) Broich, Crieff, Perthshire, Scotland
- Spouse(s): Peggy Pollock (m. 1946; div. 1970) Sally Acland Rose Nugent (m. 1972)
- Children: 4, including Rory Stewart
- Education: Worcester College, Oxford

Brian Thomas Webster Stewart (27 April 1922 – 16 August 2015) was a Scottish soldier, colonial official, diplomat and the second-most senior officer in the British Secret Intelligence Service. He fought in the Second World War, played an influential role in the Malayan Emergency, then served as British Consul-General in Shanghai on the eve of the cultural revolution, as British Representative to North Vietnam during the Vietnam War, and as the Director of Technical Services and Assistant Chief of the Secret Intelligence Service (MI6) from 1974 to 1979.

He is credited with being one of the first China specialists in the Secret Intelligence Service, and the first Director of Support Services. Sir Colin McColl, Chief of SIS from 1989 to 1994 said of Stewart: "Everything he did, he did very well. He was one of the most remarkable persons in the service."

== Early life ==
Stewart was born on 27 April 1922 in Edinburgh, the second of two children of Redvers Buller Stewart, a Calcutta jute merchant, and his wife, Mabel Banks Sparks. His parents returned to India shortly after he was born, leaving him and his brother in the care of his aunts in Kirriemuir in Scotland. He and his brother, George Redvers Hudson Banks Stewart, were educated at prep school in Dalhousie Castle, and then at Trinity College, Glenalmond in Perthshire, before both boys won open exhibitions to Worcester College, Oxford University.

== World War II ==
During World War II, Stewart and his brother joined the Black Watch (Royal Highland Regiment), in which their grandfather had also served. George (Stewart's older brother) was posted to the 5th (Angus) battalion, was wounded at El Alamein and killed in Sicily. Stewart went to OCTU at Eaton Hall, and was assigned to the Tyneside Scottish (Black Watch).

He landed on the Normandy beaches, and later remarked of the German army, "They had a bad habit of sticking snipers up trees. But I had a bad habit of shooting at snipers up trees". He fought at the Battle of Rauray, to the west of Caen, as part of Operation Epsom, in which the unit he commanded claimed the destruction of 12 Panzer tanks, and where he was wounded. The Regiment was awarded a battle honour for its role in the defence of Rauray: the battle, and Brian Stewart's role in it, is described in detail in the regimental history.

== Colonial career ==
After the war, Stewart joined the Malayan Civil Service, where he became a Chinese Affairs Officer. He was awarded the highest marks awarded to any cadet in his Cantonese exams, and after an early postings as a district officer, during which he ambushed a troop of bandits at night and sentenced them, as magistrate, the following day, he was made Secretary for Chinese Affairs in Malacca, and then Secretary for Chinese Affairs in Penang, at the age of 32.

His period in Malaya coincided with the Malayan Emergency. He worked closely alongside the Malayan Police in counter-terrorism operations. The key figure in his Malayan life, and great hero, was the High Commissioner, General Sir Gerald Templer, for whom Stewart pioneered the 'White Area' policy, whereby cooperative communities were relieved of the burdens of martial law.

== Intelligence career ==
Following Malayan Independence in 1957, Stewart joined the Secret Intelligence Service (SIS), commonly known as MI6, where he specialised in Asia. A first posting in Burma was followed by postings in Peking (Beijing), as British Consul General to Shanghai (where he formed a close friendship with Nien Cheng, who describes him in Life and Death in Shanghai), Malaysia and the Philippines. In 1967, he was made British representative to North Vietnam, and Consul General to Hanoi – a post in which he was preceded by John Horace Ragnar Colvin and succeeded by Gordon Philo who was then succeeded by Daphne Park.

In 1968, he became the first intelligence officer to be made Secretary of the Joint Intelligence Committee, inheriting the role from Brooks Richards, and serving under Sir Dick White. In 1972, he was made head of station in Hong Kong, and political adviser to the General, responsible for intelligence operations in the Far East. In 1974, he was invited back to become one of the three most senior figures in SIS, as Director of Technical Services, and he served as the de facto deputy of his friend and mentor Sir Maurice Oldfield. He hoped to succeed Oldfield as Chief of the Secret Intelligence Service, but when the post was instead awarded to Dick Franks, he retired.

According to Oldfield's biographer, SIS colleagues had no doubt about Stewart's abilities as an intelligence officer but found his character "chilly – with a streak of arrogance. ...In an unprecedented move, senior MI6 officers agreed that they would resign en masse if Maurice insisted on pushing the appointment through."

== Later life ==
Stewart's first role after leaving the Secret Intelligence Service was as Director of the Rubber Growers Association in Malaya, in which role he was responsible for a few thousand policemen guarding rubber plantations.

Then, three years after leaving government, he became the Director of Operations in China for Racal Group, based in Hong Kong, leading their business in the newly opened Chinese economy. He retired in 1997, returning to his father's house, Broich, in Crieff, Perthshire, where he wrote five books, and planted thousands of trees.

Stewart is commemorated in a painting by Paul Benney, portraying him as a 92-year-old Normandy Veteran, commissioned by Charles, Prince of Wales, and held in the Royal Collection. The Atlantic Magazine described Stewart as an example of one of the "last waves of Allied Heroes..a connection to almost unimaginable courage—and to the heyday of British colonialism".

== Works ==
- Stewart, Brian (editor). All Men's Wisdom (a book on Chinese proverbs)
- Stewart, Brian. Scrapbook of a Roving Highlander: 80 Years Round Asia and Back, Acorn, 2002 ISBN 1903263549 (autobiography)
- Stewart, Brian, ed. (2003). Operation Sharp End: Smashing Terrorism in Malaya, 1948-58. Memories of the Malayan Police. Acorn. ISBN 190326376X.
- Stewart, Brian (2006). Call to Arms: Officer Cadet Training at Eaton Hall 1943-1958. Meigle. ISBN 0955452805. (co-author Keith Taylor)
- Stewart, Brian (2015). Why Spy? The Art of Intelligence. Hurst & Co. ISBN 978-1-849-04513-1. (co-author Samantha Newbery)

== Honours ==

Ribbon	Description	Notes
	Order of St Michael and St George (CMG)	Companion; 1968
	1939–1945 Star	
	France and Germany Star	
	Defence Medal	
	War Medal 1939–1945	
	Queen Elizabeth II Coronation Medal	2 June 1953
	Legion of Honour	Chevalier; 2015; Awarded by France

== Family ==
Stewart married Peggy Pollock in 1946. They had two daughters, Heather and Anne, before divorcing in 1970. Anne married Andrew, the son of Field Marshal Michael Carver, Baron Carver.

He married Sally Elizabeth Acland Nugent (daughter of Dr Samuel Rose and Mary-Louise Wroth – later Baroness Nugent) in 1972. They had a son, the diplomat and former Member of Parliament Rory Stewart, and a daughter, Fiona.
