= Gordon Philo =

English intelligence officer

Gordon Charles George Philo CMG MC
- Born: 8 January 1920; London
- Died: 24 January 2009 (aged 89)
- Education: Wadham College, Oxford; Sorbonne University
- Occupation: Intelligence Officer/Diplomat
- Spouse: Mavis "Vicky" Galsworthy (m. 1952; died 1986)
- Awards: KMN (1968); CMG (1970)
- Espionage activity
- Allegiance: United Kingdom
- Agency: MI6
- Service years: 1951–1978
- Rank: Principal Staff Officer to the Head of Service 1973–75
- Military career
- Branch: Royal Army Service Corps
- Service: 1940–1946
- Rank: Lieutenant
- Unit: 224th (Parachute) Field Ambulance
- Awards: MC (1944)
- Writing career
- Pen name: Charles Forsyte
- Years active: 1961–1980
- Genres: Detective fiction; literary criticism; history
- Notable work: The decoding of Edwin Drood

Gordon Charles George Philo CMG MC (8 January 1920 – 24 January 2009) was an English intelligence officer, soldier and writer. He participated in the Second World War from 1940 to 1946 and was parachuted into Normandy on D-day, subsequently being awarded the Military Cross for his actions. After the war he had a career in MI6 from 1951 to 1978, including an appointment as Consul-General at Hanoi during the Vietnam War.

== Early life ==
Philo was born in London on 8 January 1920. He was educated at Haberdashers' Aske's School in Hampstead, from where he was awarded the Methuen Scholarship in Modern History at Wadham College, Oxford. He went up in 1938 and took an ordinary B.A. before being called up into the Army.

== Military career ==
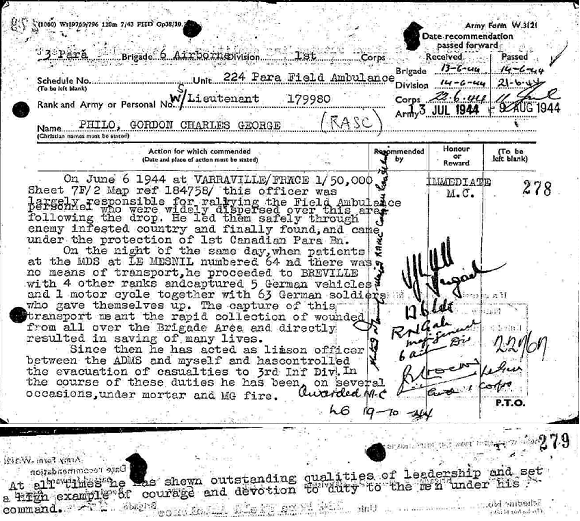
Award citation for the Military Cross 1944

Philo joined the Army in 1940 but proved not to be a natural soldier and had to repeat his basic training before being commissioned in 1941 into the Royal Army Service Corps. Philo was posted to the Royal West African Frontier Force in 1942–1943 and served in the Gold Coast. Philo was based in the United Kingdom as a transport officer with the 224th (Parachute) Field Ambulance in 1943–1944. He parachuted into France on D-day.

For his actions on 6 June 1944 he was awarded the Military Cross on 19 October 1944. Philo led his Field Ambulance troops, which had been parachuted around Varaville and were dispersed, to safety through enemy lines. He then, with four other soldiers, captured 63 German soldiers and five vehicles, which allowed the evacuation of 64 allied wounded men. The award citation concluded "At all times has shewn outstanding qualities of leadership and set a high example of courage and devotion to duty to the men under his command." Philo completed his military service in Europe and India in 1945–1946.

== Academic career ==
After returning from his war service in 1946, Philo attempted to pursue an academic career. He gained his B.A. (Hons.) in 1947 but only received a 2nd class degree. He then went on to study French and Russian at the Sorbonne in 1947–1948. He became a lecturer in Modern History at Wadham College, Oxford in 1948–1949, and then was a foundation member of St Antony's College, Oxford in 1950 but was unable to gain a permanent academic position. Philo wrote a paper on Alexis de Tocqueville in 1952.

== Intelligence and diplomatic career ==
Philo was recommended to the SIS by William Deakin, the Warden of St Antony's College. He joined the Foreign Service in 1951. He was immediately sent on a Russian language course at Christ's College, Cambridge from 1951–1952, and then received his first posting in Istanbul from 1952–1956; while there he was promoted to third secretary in 1954. His next posting was as second secretary at Ankara 1957–1958.

Philo was in charge of training new entrants to SIS when David Cornwell (John le Carré) switched from the Security Service (MI5) to SIS (MI6) in 1960. In London in 1961–1963 Philo assisted with the processing and circulating of material from the Russian double agent Oleg Penkovsky. He was then posted to Kuala Lumpur from 1963–1967 as liaison officer during the Indonesia–Malaysia confrontation for which he was awarded the Order of the Defender of the Realm (KMN Hon.) Philo was promoted to first secretary at the Foreign Office in 1968.

He was Consul-General at Hanoi, North Vietnam 1968–1969. Britain's Consulate-General did not have diplomatic status, since Britain did not officially recognise the Democratic Republic of North Vietnam, instead the office was accredited to the Hanoi local authorities. The post was an exceptional case in the service because it was a hardship post and the consul-general was the only consular officer in the mission. For his service in Hanoi Philo was awarded the CMG.

After returning to London headquarters, Philo held a series of posts in the security and personnel fields. He was Principal Staff Officer to the Head of the Secret Intelligence Service 1973–75. The Times obituary said: "His career in the SIS was notable for the consistency with which he maintained standards of intellectual rigour, absolute integrity and kindness to his colleagues ... He was, perhaps, too nice and too self-effacing a man to reach the top of his profession. But his career was not without distinction."

== Retirement ==
Philo retired from the SIS in 1978. In the period 1978-1983 Philo wrote a post-1945 history of the Secret Intelligence Service, which is described as "a work of formidable scale and scholarship" but this remains classified, and is unlikely to be published for many years. For comparison, Keith Jeffrey's official history of the SIS covered 1909–1949 and was published in 2010.

Philo carried out a wide variety of activities in his retirement.

- Extended Interview Assessor on a part-time basis in the Home Office Unit of the Civil Service Selection Board between 1978 and 1990.
- Chairman of the council of The Kipling Society from 1986–88 and again from 1997-99.
- Participated as a speaker in 1993–1995 at the annual "Dickens Universe" at the University of California, Santa Cruz. Philo was described in the program as a Dickens scholar who was "an authority on matters Droodian".
- Wrote articles for The Dickensian between 1980 and 2001. Tony Williams, in his obituary of Philo, stated: "A man of great intelligence, integrity, loyalty, an inspirational colleague and friend, Gordon Philo's was a life of service to his country, and his enthusiasms."
- Member of the Athenaeum Club, London which he joined in 1976, and in 2001 wrote an article about an aspect of its history connected to Charles Dickens.
- Philo left a legacy of £350,000 to the Royal National Lifeboat Institution and an unstated amount to the British Library.

== Publications ==
Charles Forsyte was the joint pen name of the husband-and-wife writing team of Gordon Philo and Vicky Galsworthy Philo. Together they wrote a series of "splendidly readable whodunnits":

- Novels starring the detective Richard Left, a fictional Scotland Yard inspector
  - Diplomatic Death (1961) using background from their diplomatic posting in Istanbul
  - Diving Death (US Title: Dive Into Danger) (1962)
  - Double Death (1965)
- Murder with Minarets (1968) also set in Turkey
- The decoding of Edwin Drood (1980) – an analysis and completion of Charles Dickens's unfinished novel The Mystery of Edwin Drood. The book received a positive review in The New York Times from Angus Wilson who referred to "Mr. Forsyte's brilliant analysis of the Drood problems". Leon Garfield also wrote a positive review in The Dickensian. An academic commented "Forsyte’s [approach] belongs to a tradition of completions which are much more closely affiliated with speculations, setting out to solve the mystery and complete the plot in a plausible fashion."

Diplomatic posts
Preceded by Brian Stewart	Consul General at Hanoi; 1968–1969	Succeeded by Daphne Park
