= David Walker (RAF administrative officer) =

Royal Air Force air marshals

David Allan Walker
- Born: 14 July 1956 (age 70)
- Spouse: Jane Alison Fraser Calder (m. 1983)
- Military career
- Allegiance: United Kingdom
- Branch: Royal Air Force
- Service years: 1974–2011
- Rank: Air Marshal
- Commands: Training Group RAF; RAF Halton
- Awards: Knight Commander of the Royal Victorian Order; Officer of the Order of the British Empire
- Other work: Master of the Household; Extra Equerry to The Queen; Deputy Lieutenant of Gloucestershire

Air Marshal Sir David Allan Walker, KCVO, OBE, DL (born 14 July 1956) is a Director at Alexander Mann Solutions, and a member of the advisory board of Auticon. He is a retired senior Royal Air Force officer and Master of the Household to the Sovereign.

== RAF career ==
Walker was commissioned in the Administrative Branch of the Royal Air Force (RAF) on 1 September 1974. He was regraded to pilot officer on 15 July 1977 (seniority 15 October 1975), promoted to flying officer on 15 January 1978 (seniority 15 April 1976), and promoted to flight lieutenant on 15 October 1980. Walker was appointed a Member of the Royal Victorian Order (MVO) in 1992, and an Officer of the Order of the British Empire (OBE) in 1995.

Walker became Station commander at RAF Halton in 1997, Director of Corporate Communications for the RAF in 1998 and Director of Personnel and Training Policy in 2002. He went on to be Air Officer Commanding the RAF Training Group in 2003 before being seconded to Buckingham Palace in 2005 as Master of the Household to the Sovereign. Walker was knighted as a Knight Commander of the Royal Victorian Order (KCVO) in the 2011 Birthday Honours, being invested in a personal audience with Queen Elizabeth II on 13 July 2011.

== Personal life ==
Walker is the son of Allan Walker and Audrey (née Brothwell). In 1983, he married Jane Alison Fraser Calder.

Military offices
Preceded by Graham Miller	Air Officer Commanding Training Group; 2003–2005	Succeeded by John Ponsonby
Court offices
Preceded by Sir Anthony Blackburn	Master of the Household; 2005–2013	Succeeded by Tony Johnstone-Burt
