= Consulate General of the United Kingdom, Hanoi =

British consul-generals in Hanoi 1954–73

The Consulate General of the United Kingdom, Hanoi was the British government's representative office in North Vietnam in the period 1954–1973. A British consulate normally fosters trade and provides services to British residents and visitors, but in the case of the Hanoi consulate general the main activity was the gathering of information about wartime conditions and attitudes.

== Origin ==
The establishment of the consulate general, Hanoi arose out of the 1954 Geneva Conference which was established to resolve, amongst other matters, the future of French Indochina. The 1954 Geneva Accords stipulated that Vietnam would be divided temporarily into North (Democratic Republic of Vietnam) and South (State of Vietnam) with unifying elections to be held in 1956 to determine the future of the whole of Vietnam. However, for political reasons, these scheduled elections never took place (see Vietnam War: transition period).

The consulate originated in 1946, under French colonial rule, and was upgraded to a consulate general in 1954 as a gesture to the North, and in recognition of Anthony Eden’s leading role in the Geneva peace negotiations. However, the consulate general did not have diplomatic or consular status, since Britain did not officially recognise the Democratic Republic of North Vietnam, instead the office was accredited to the Hanoi municipal authorities. This meant that the consul-general was not recognised by the North Vietnamese authorities as being entitled to diplomatic status, privileges or facilities. When the North Vietnamese authorities wished to communicate with the consul-general, the Mayor of Hanoi would send a message not by using their title, but simply by sending a letter to their name and address. From 1967 the consulate general was permitted no outbound cipher telecommunications. As a favour to the British, the Canadians allowed the sealed British diplomatic bags to be carried inside the Canadian diplomatic bag.

Consular representation can be a method of conducting limited relations in the special case of an unrecognized state, when the state was created out of part of a larger one in which an external power happened already to have a consulate. This was the case in North Vietnam which had been created by dividing it from South Vietnam, with Britain already having a consulate in Hanoi.

The reason that the Vietnamese allowed the British to maintain the consulate general, was because they had a consulate in London and a consulate general in Hong Kong, which were important for them as outlets for propaganda, intelligence gathering and for raising funds. The North Vietnamese wanted to preserve their outpost in Hong Kong, which at the time was a British colony, and so they allowed the British consulate general to remain in Hanoi but restricted its activities as much as possible.

== Conditions ==
The consul-general, whilst nominally seconded to the Foreign Office, was often an officer in the Secret Intelligence Service (MI6). Daphne Park's biographer commented: "The British consulate-general in Hanoi was no ordinary diplomatic outpost. Though described as a consulate-general, it was in fact an SIS spy station. Described even more accurately, it was an intelligence outpost concealed inside a barely functioning faux-diplomatic mission in the capital city of a country at war." The funding for the consulate general was shared between the Foreign Office and SIS.

The position was an exceptional case in the service because it was a hardship post, and the consul-general was sometimes the only consular officer in the mission. In 1965, the consul-general (Myles Ponsonby), was described by the then Prime Minister Harold Wilson as having to operate in "most difficult conditions".

A Canadian diplomat described Hanoi in 1969 as being "dreary, austere, regimented, puritanical and much more serious-minded than Saigon. There were no restaurants, no recreational facilities ... It was stiflingly hot in the summer with no air conditioning and wet and rainy or "crachant" as the Vietnamese described it, in the winter."

Brian Stewart, consul-general in 1967–68, described diplomatic life in Hanoi as being extremely limited, with no British subjects requiring consular support, and few other Western diplomats, most of the embassies being either from the Soviet Bloc or Third World countries. Stewart's only official contact was with the Foreign Affairs Bureau of the Municipality of Hanoi. Movement around the city and contact with the people was heavily restricted, nevertheless, even without secret sources, Stewart was able to report back to London on the state of the city and the morale of the people.

In the 1960s the British consulate general was located at 16 Ly Thuong Kiet street (Phố Lý Thường Kiệt) while the residence of the consul-general was around the corner in a villa at 15 Phan Chu Trinh Road (Phố Phan Châu Trinh) and had previously been a house of ill-repute. Consuls general assumed that their speech in the consulate and the residence was monitored at all times. Consular staff were only allowed to walk freely within a distance of one or two kilometres of the consulate.

== Activities and influence ==
In 1965 Harold Wilson made a vain attempt to negotiate peace through a Commonwealth mission consisting of four Heads of Government (Britain, Nigeria, Ghana, and Trinidad and Tobago). The Foreign Office was warned by the British consul-general Myles Ponsonby that the North Vietnamese would be unlikely to accept a mission led by Britain because of its pro-American stance on Vietnam and also because Britain would not officially recognise Communist North Vietnam. Wilson selected Harold Davies to go to Hanoi to attempt to broker talks between North Vietnam and the USA. However, news of the supposedly secret peace mission leaked, and Ho Chi Minh refused to meet Davies as proposed, thus causing embarrassment to the British government. Ponsonby provided support to Davies' mission.

The Foreign Office attached importance to Ponsonby's reports from North Vietnam because they called into question the basic assumptions of American policy. Ponsonby observed that the Russians, and perhaps also the Chinese, had as much difficulty dealing with the North Vietnam regime as the USA had in dealing with South Vietnam.

Brian Stewart commented: "I am convinced that we more than earned our keep in this post, supplying a perspective on North Vietnam which was not available to our allies ... we were on the ground, and so had a view denied to the embassies in Saigon. We could see the people and the shops, and draw some conclusions about the food situation, health and morale. This direct experience was a valuable ingredient for assessors struggling to put together an intelligence mosaic. I am sure that even if our assessment was gloomy, the US was grateful for our moral support."

Stewart noted that the American analysts in Saigon tended to assess that the North Vietnamese were losing the war based on traditional measures such as battlefield losses. However he believed that the Americans underestimated the importance of morale, and the fact that the Vietnamese were fighting for their homeland, whilst the American people were fighting a war far from the USA. Stewart consistently reported that morale remained high among the Vietnamese and that they were determined to fight on until, like the Chinese and the French before them, the US decided to give up and go home.

A Canadian diplomat stated that the most valuable diplomat in Hanoi in 1970 was the "redoubtable" Daphne Park. Park was an authoritative analyst on Vietnamese communism as well as North Vietnam's objectives and policy, and her predictions about the course of the Vietnam war turned out to be unfailingly accurate.

The existence of the consulate general allowed Britain to preserve a listening post in Hanoi throughout the Vietnam War, and to report on conversations with the diplomatic corps and local officials (although they had to be wary of disinformation). Despite the restrictions on the consul-general's activities, this allowed the United Kingdom to pass information to the USA about such issues as morale, local defence preparations and Sino-Soviet differences with the Vietnamese. Almost all of the reports that the Foreign Office received from the consuls general were passed onto the Americans.

The US benefitted significantly from information provided by MI6 in Hanoi. As consul-general Liudzius commented in 1971: "...the post [consul-general, Hanoi] provides just about the only window which the Western world has on events in North Vietnam."

== Consuls general ==
In the table below consuls general who were also known to be SIS heads of station in Hanoi (H/HANOI) are indicated with a tick.

British consuls general in Hanoi 1954–73
Name	Service	Award	Appointed	SIS H/HANOI
Geoffrey Hunter Baker	1954–56		20 September 1954	
Kenneth John Simpson	1956–58		19 May 1956	Done
Malcolm Thomas Walker	1958–60		8 April 1958	
Joseph Francis Ford	1960–62		11 April 1960	Done
John Kenneth Blackwell	1962–64	OBE (1964)	24 May 1962	
Myles Ponsonby	1964–65	CBE (1965)	2 September 1964	Done
Henry Bryan Shepherd	1965–66		16 December 1965	
John Colvin	1966–67	CMG (1967)	11 October 1966	Done
Brian Stewart	1967–68	CMG (1968)	3 October 1967	Done
Gordon Philo	1968–69	CMG (1969)	September 1968	Done
Daphne Park	1969–70	CMG (1970)	3 October 1969	Done
John Michael Liudzius	1970–71		31 October 1970	Done
Joe Booth Wright	1971–72		November 1971	Alan Prosser MBE (vice-consul)
Timothy John Everard	1972–73		2 December 1972	
Julian Harston	1973–74		23 June 1973	(consul)

Vice-consuls were appointed in the period 1954–1973 but the post was sometimes vacant, for example in 1967–1968 when the United States was bombing North Vietnam; From 1955 to 1959 a vice-consul was located in Haiphong.

== Conversion to embassy ==
The establishment of diplomatic relations with North Vietnam followed the January 1973 Paris Peace Accords between North Vietnam and the USA. Diplomatic relations between Britain and North Vietnam began on 1 September 1973. At this point the consulate general was downgraded to a consulate. In 1975 the British embassy in Vietnam was relocated from Saigon to Hanoi.
