= Aseff Ahmad Daula =

Pakistani politician (1940–2022)

Asif Ahmad Ali Daula
- آصف احمد علی ڈولا

Minister of Foreign Affairs
- In office 16 November 1993 – 4 November 1996
- Prime Minister: Benazir Bhutto
- Preceded by: Farooq Leghari
- Succeeded by: Sahabzada Yaqub Khan

Personal details
- Born: 21 October 1940 British Raj
- Died: 19 May 2022 (aged 81) Lahore, Pakistan
- Party: PTI (2012-2020)
- Education: Government College University, Lahore; St John's College, Cambridge

Sardar Asif Ahmad Ali Daula (21 October 1940 – 19 May 2022) was a Pakistani politician who served as the 18th Foreign Minister of Pakistan from 1993 to 1996. He was a senior member of Pakistan Tehreek-e-Insaf and Pakistan Peoples Party. On 25 December 2011, he joined PTI but resigned when party awarded Khurshid Kasuri National Assembly ticket instead of him. He was elected to the National Assembly of Pakistan from Kasur in 1994 and again in 2008 by an impressive margin of ten thousand votes. He has also served as the Minister for Education and Federal Minister of Information Technology and Telecommunication between 2008 and 2010. He rejoined Pakistan Tehreek e Insaf on 10 November 2017 during a press conference with Imran Khan in Lahore.

== Career ==
Sardar Aseff Ahmad Ali was a senior member of the Pakistan Peoples Party. He was the foreign minister of Pakistan in the cabinet of Benazir Bhutto during her second tenure as Prime Minister.

=== Minister of Economic Affairs ===
Sardar Aseff also served as the Minister for Economic Affairs during the 1991–1993 Nawaz Sharif government, but resigned from the cabinet after developing differences with the Prime Minister. His resignation along with those of other members of parliament eventually led to overthrow of the first Nawaz Sharif government. While serving as the Economic Affairs Minister, Sardar Aseff led numerous delegations of Pakistani civil society members and organisations to Russia and cultivated business and diplomatic relationships with various disintegrated states of the former Soviet Union. He was awarded honorary citizenship of Kazakhstan and Kyrgyzstan.

=== Foreign Minister of Pakistan ===
As Foreign Minister of Pakistan, he was unanimously elected chairman of the Organisation of the Islamic Conference. In 2003, he held a painting exhibition at Lahore, where he displayed some of his hand-drawn sketches and paintings, which was attended by then-Prime Minister Zafarullah Khan Jamali. In the recently held general elections, he was returned to the National Assembly for the fifth time after defeating his archrival, the outgoing foreign minister Khurshid Mahmud Kasuri.

=== Later career ===
In 2017 he resigned from Pakistan Peoples Party and joined Party of Imran Khan former cricketer Pakistan Tehreek-e-Insaf. He opposed Pervez Musharraf's firing of Pakistan's judiciary.

== Personal life ==
=== Family background ===
Sardar Aseff Ahmed Ali belonged to a principal landholding Arain family of the Punjab region whose role in politics, in this region precedes the British rule in India. The family has a reputation of repelling authority and was instrumental in fighting against the Sikhs and later the British. His uncle Sardar Muhammad Hussain remained a member of parliament pre and post partition and pioneered the advent of Pakistan Muslim League in central Punjab region. His father Sardar Ahmad Ali (politician) who also remained a member of parliament throughout his career, and Sardar Muhammad Hussain led regional movements against the Unionist Party led by wealthy Zamindars and patronized by the British.

=== Education ===
He studied at Lawrence College in Ghora Gali. He earned a B.A. (Hons.) degree from Government College University, Lahore (1959–62), and a B.A. (Hons.) degree from St John's College, Oxford (1963–1966).

=== Death ===
Daula died on the evening of 19 May 2022. He had been receiving treatment for a heart condition in a Lahore hospital, and suffered a heart attack.

Political offices
| Preceded by Farooq Leghari | Foreign Minister of Pakistan; 1993–1996 | Succeeded by Sahabzada Yaqub Khan |
