= Ian Middleton =

New Zealand author

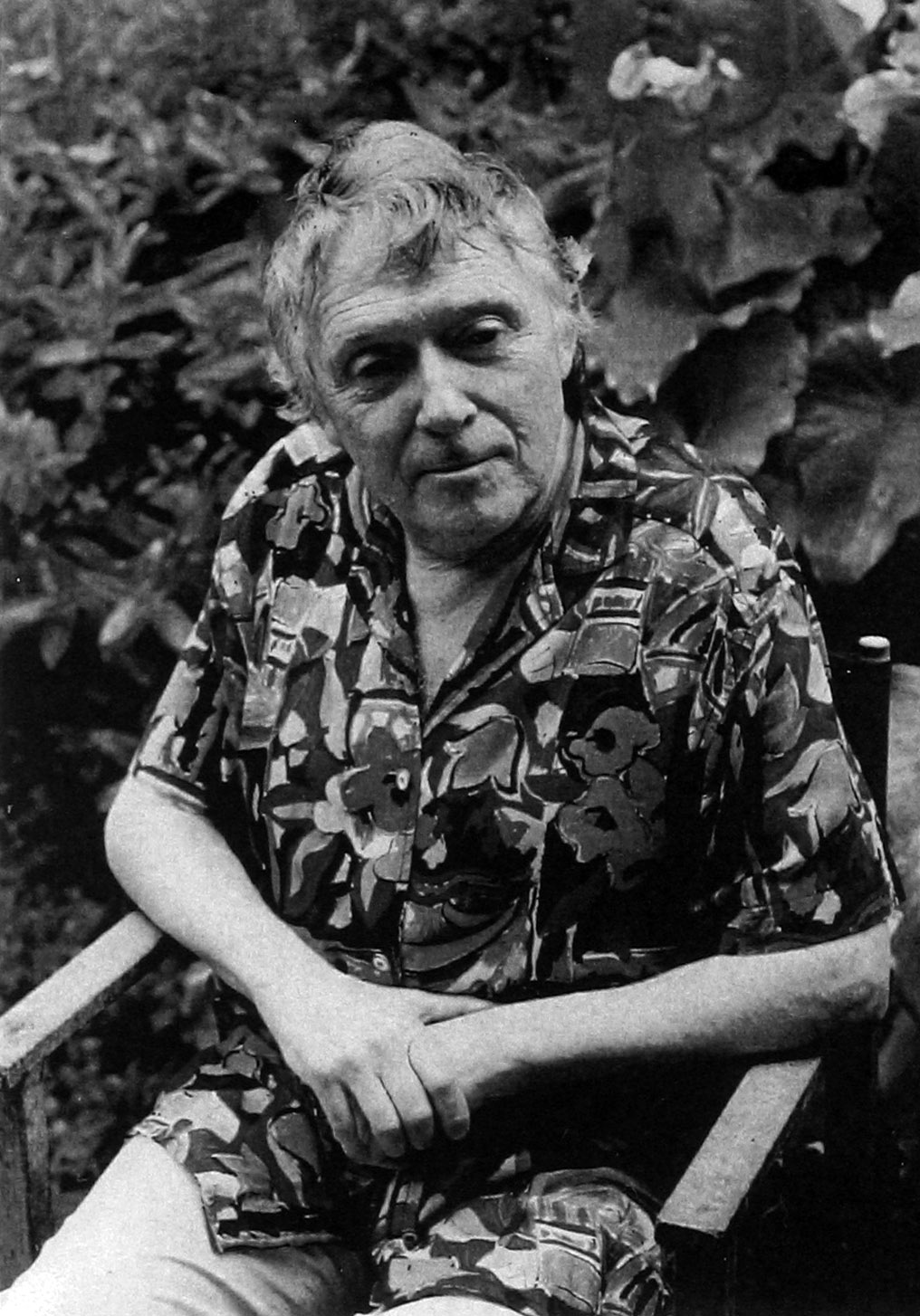
Ian Middleton

Ian Middleton (26 October 1928 – 24 October 2007) was a New Zealand novelist, who made a particular mark with his books set in post-Second World War Japan. Born in New Plymouth, he was the younger brother of noted New Zealand short story writer O. E. Middleton.

Blind, he said this gave him a "special perspective but 'without limitation'", and has been attributed to the "strong metaphoric colour, sensual - often erotic - quality and lush verbal richness of his writing".

A full list of his publications can be seen at the University of Auckland's NZ Literature file and more biographical information is at the New Zealand Book Council's website.

== Main works ==
- Pet Shop (Waiura: A. Taylor, 1979)
- Faces of Hachiko (Auckland: Inca Print, 1984)
- Sunflower: a Novel of Present Day Japan (Auckland: Benton Press, 1986)
- Mr Ponsonby (Auckland: Lyndon, 1989)
- Reiko (Wellington: Moana Press, 1990)
- Harvest (Ōkato: Puniho Art Press, 1995)
- I See a Voice (Auckland: Flamingo, 1997)

The 'Japanese trilogy' - Faces of Hachiko, Sunflower and Reiko - describes a personal and complex portrayal of post-war Japan. Pet Shop, a novel on his early upbringing in small-town New Zealand, wartime Auckland and his experiences on a Norwegian tanker, was described by New Zealand writer Kevin Ireland as "an absorbing picture of the repressions that passed for a moral code".
