= Sahabzada Yaqub Khan =

Pakistani politician and military officer

Yaqub Ali Khan SPk
- صاحبزادہ یعقوب خان
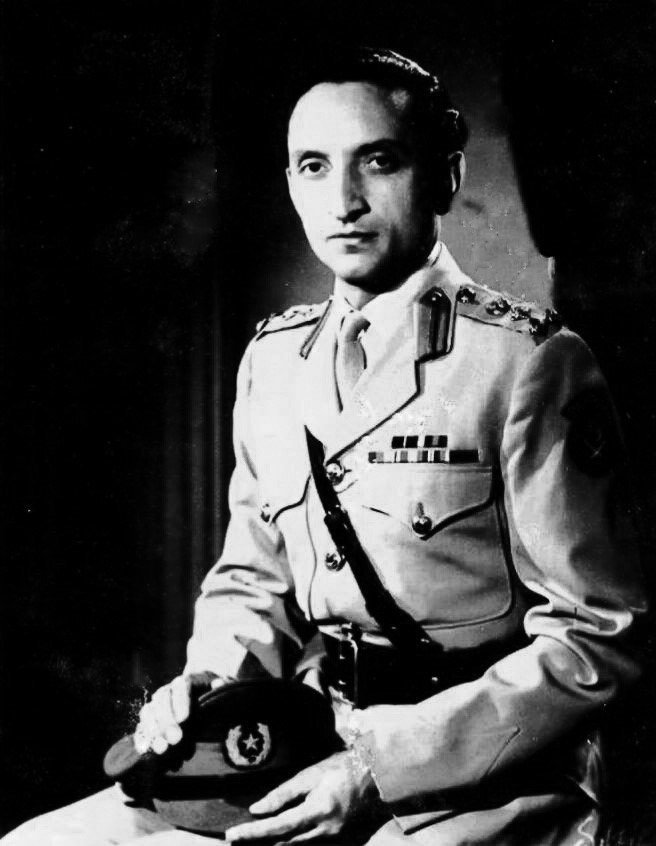
- Yaqub as a Brigadier in 1950s

15th & 17th Minister of Foreign Affairs
- In office 11 November 1996 – 24 February 1997
- President: Farooq Leghari
- Prime Minister: Malik Meraj Khalid
- Preceded by: Asif Ahmad Ali
- Succeeded by: Gohar Ayub
- In office 21 March 1982 – 20 March 1991
- President: Zia-ul-Haq (1982–1988); Ghulam Ishaq Khan (1988–1991)
- Prime Minister: Mohammad Juneijo; Benazir Bhutto
- Preceded by: Agha Shahi
- Succeeded by: Akram Zaki (acting)

Special Representative of the Secretary-General for Western Sahara
- In office 23 March 1992 – August 1995
- Preceded by: Johannes Manz
- Succeeded by: Erik Jensen

Pakistan Ambassador to the United States
- In office 19 December 1973 – 3 January 1979
- President: Fazal Illahi
- Prime Minister: Zulfikar Ali Bhutto
- Preceded by: Sultan Mohammed Khan
- Succeeded by: Sultan Mohammed Khan

10th & 12th Military Governor of East Pakistan
- In office 1 March 1971 – 7 March 1971
- President: Yahya Khan
- Prime Minister: Nurul Amin
- Preceded by: V/Adm S. M. Ahsan
- Succeeded by: Lt. Gen. Tikka Khan
- In office 23 August 1969 – 1 September 1969
- President: Yahya Khan
- Preceded by: Maj Gen Muzaffaruddin
- Succeeded by: V/Adm S. M. Ahsan

Personal details
- Born: Mohammad Yaqub Ali Khan; 23 December 1920 Rampur State, British Indian Empire
- Died: 26 January 2016 (aged 95) Islamabad, Pakistan
- Citizenship: British Subject (1920–1947); Pakistani (1947–2016)
- Party: Pakistan Peoples Party; (1974–1977; 1988–1996)
- Spouse: Begum Tuba Khaleeli
- Relatives: Fauzia Kasuri (niece)
- Education: Rashtriya Indian Military College; Indian Military Academy; Command and Staff College
- Cabinet: Zia administration; Yahya administration; Benazir ministry
- Nickname(s): SYAK; Prince Soldier

Military service
- Allegiance: (British Raj) British India; Pakistan
- Branch/service: (British Raj) British Indian Army; Pakistan Army
- Years of service: 1940–1971
- Rank: Lieutenant General
- Unit: 18th Cavalry Regiment; Armoured Corps
- Commands: Eastern Command; Chief of General Staff; GOC, 1st Armoured Division; Commandant, Command and Staff College; Commandant, School of Armour and Mechanized Warfare
- Battles/wars: World War II; Siege of Tobruk; Indo-Pakistani War of 1965; Indo-Pakistani War of 1971
- Awards: Sitara-e-Pakistan; 1939-1945 Star; Africa Star; Italy Star; War Medal 1939-45; Star of Jordan
- S/No.: PA – 136

Sahabzada Mohammad Yaqub Ali Khan SPk (Urdu: صاحبزادہ یعقوب خان ; 23 December 1920 – 26 January 2016) was a Pakistani politician, diplomat, military figure, linguist, and a retired 3-Star Officer in the Pakistani Army. "He was Pakistan's public face in international affairs for three decades" per The New York Times newspaper obituary.

After independence in 1947, he opted for Pakistan and joined the Pakistan Army where he participated in the Indo-Pakistani war of 1965. He was the commander of the army's Eastern Command in East Pakistan. He was appointed as governor of East Pakistan in 1969 and 1971 but recalled to Pakistan after he submitted his resignation amid civil unrest. In 1973, he joined the foreign service and was appointed as the Pakistan Ambassador to the United States and later ascended as foreign minister, serving under President Zia-ul-Haq in 1982.

His stint as foreign minister played a major role in the Soviet intervention in Afghanistan (1979–89) and he took part in negotiations to end the Contras in Nicaragua (1981–87) on the behalf of the United Nations. In the 1990s, he served as an official of the United Nations for Western Sahara until he was reappointed as foreign minister under Prime Minister Benazir Bhutto. After retiring from diplomatic services in 1997, he spent his remaining years in Islamabad and died in Islamabad in 2016.

== Biography ==
=== Youth and World War II ===
==== Early days ====
Mohammad Yaqub Ali Khan was born into Indian nobility into the Rohilla branch of the Kheshgi family (a Pashtun Clan in Rampur), United Provinces, British Indian Empire on 23 December 1920. He had also been a close relative of the family of the Nawabs of Kasur, of Punjab. His father, Sir Abdus Samad Khan was an aristocrat and politician who served as chief minister of Rampur, and as British India's representative to the League of Nations.

He was educated at the Rashtriya Indian Military College at Dehradun, then the Indian Military Academy and gained a commission in British Indian Army in 1940 and subsequently attached to the 18th King Edward's Own Cavalry.

==== Participation in WWII and POW ====
In his military career he saw action during World War II and served in the North African campaign where he was attached to 18th King Edward's Own Cavalry from April 1942. He was taken prisoner of war in North Africa in May 1942. In September 1943 he escaped from the Italian prisoner of war camp P. G. 91 in Avezzano (with two other Indian officers) and was out for four to five months attempting to move south to Allied lines, but they were subsequently re-captured by German forces who put him in a prisoner of war camp in Germany until April 1945 when he was released by the U.S. Army soldiers. During his time in German custody, he learnt languages by interacting with fellow prisoners and reading literature in those languages.

==== Return to India and Partition ====
Upon returning to India in 1945, he was selected as an adjutant to Field Marshal Lord Wavell with an army rank of major. After hearing the news of partition of India and creation of Pakistan, he decided to opt for Pakistan, and initially was selected as aide-de-camp (ADC) to Muhammad Ali Jinnah– the first Governor-General of Pakistan. It was then-Lieutenant S.M. Ahsan who was made the ADC at the behest of Lord Mountbatten, and Yaqub was appointed as commandant of the Governor-General's bodyguard for the first governor-general which he led until 1948. In the period 1948–49, he attended the short one-year course at the Command and Staff College at Quetta and graduated with a staff officer's degree.

In 1951, he served in the Military Intelligence (MI) as lieutenant-colonel, and directed initiatives to analytical branch of the ISI for the whereabouts of the Indian Army but he reportedly struggled with providing factual intelligence that was provided to ISI.

He commanded the 11th Prince Albert Victor's Own Cavalry (Frontier Force), Armoured Corps from December 1952 to October 1953.

He was promoted to colonel in 1953 and went to Paris in France to attend the famed École spéciale militaire de Saint-Cyr where he graduated in 1954.

Upon returning to Pakistan, he was promoted to brigadier in 1955 where he served as a chief instructor at the Command and Staff College.

=== Staff and war appointments: 1960–69 ===
In 1958, he was appointed as the vice chief of general staff at the army GHQ and later becoming the commandant of the Command and Staff College in Quetta in 1960. In 1960,he was promoted to major-general and commanded the 1st Armoured Division of Armoured Corps and was said to have a portrait of Field Marshal Erwin Rommel in his office. As an armored commander, he arranged a course on philosophy on the panzer doctrine to educate the armoured division on the tank battles and strategies.

He participated in the war against India in 1965, having command of his 1st Armoured Division. He helped develop the operational planning of the armoured vehicular warfare deployments against the Indian Army advances in Punjab and presented his views at the Army GHQ. Soon after, he was appointed as director-general military operations (DGMO) by General Musa Khan and directed all formats of ground operations during the 1965 war against India.

After the war, he was appointed as chief of general staff at the army GHQ under army chief General Yahya Khan in 1966 and remained there until 1969.

=== East Pakistan: military advisor and governorship (1969–71) ===
In 1969, Lieutenant-General Yaqub Khan was posted to East Pakistan as the commander of Eastern Command in Dacca by President Yahya Khan and helped evaluate the command rotation of the eastern military. Soon, he was appointed as governor of East Pakistan where he began learning the Bengali language and became accustomed to Bengali culture.

He was known to be an unusual military officer who knew very well about "limits of force", and did not believe in the use of brute force to settle political disputes. In 1969–71, he worked together with Admiral Ahsan in advising the Yahya administration in an effort to resolve the situation and restricted strictly the proposal of usage of military force in the province.

At the cabinet meeting, he was often fierce and strictly resisted the usage of military option but was respected in the military due to his understanding of Bengali issues and whose colleagues often labeled him as "Bingos". In 1970, he notably coordinated the relief operations when the disastrous cyclone had hit the state and gained prestige for his efforts in the country.

In 1971, he participated in the area contingency and fact-finding mission, which was known as the Ahsan–Yaqub Mission, to resolve the political deadlock between East Pakistan and Pakistan as both men argued that "military measures would not change the political situations".

In March 1971, he became aware of the rumors of a military action against East Pakistanis and delivered desperate military signals to President Yahya Khan in Islamabad to not use military solution as he feared Indian intervention. After the resignation of Admiral Ahsan, he was ordered to use military force against the civil agitation led by the Awami League but refused to take this order and tendered his resignation to be posted back to Pakistan. His resignation came in the light of resisting the military orders and fiercely maintained to President Yahya that "military solution was not acceptable". He is highly respected in the army due to his stance and professionalism.

Commenting on the situation, Yaqub maintained that: "[President] Yahya was also keen to impose the "open sword" martial law to roll back the situation as it was in 1969." He lodged a strong protest against the military solution and maintained that the "central government had failed to listen to the voices of their co-citizens in the East." To many authors, Yaqub Khan had become a "conscientious objector" in the military.

He was posted back to Pakistan, joined the Army GHQ staff and participated in winter war against India in 1971 without commanding an assignment and retired from the military after the war, also in 1971.

== Foreign service ==
=== Ambassadorship to France, United States, and Soviet Union ===
After seeking the honorable discharge from the army, he joined the foreign service as a career diplomat in 1972, initially taking his first assignment as Pakistan Ambassador to France until 1973. In 1973, Prime Minister Zulfikar Ali Bhutto appointed him as the Pakistan Ambassador to the United States which he served in this capacity until 1979. He was sent Pakistan's envoy to United States when the foreign relations with the United States were cooling but he gained international prominence when he became involved with Egyptian ambassador Ashraf Ghorbal and Iranian Ambassador to the United States Ardeshir Zahedi to take part in defusing the siege of three federal buildings in the Washington D.C. by the group of American Muslims in 1977.

In 1979, he was sent to Moscow and was appointed as Pakistan's ambassador to the Soviet Union where he worked towards building foreign relations with the Soviet Union by signing an educational accord. In 1980, he was reassigned in France again where he remained until 1982.

=== Foreign minister and United Nations ===
Yaqub Ali Khan was brought in to the Zia administration as foreign minister in 1982 when Agha Shahi departed President Zia-ul-Haq's cabinet. He was appointed foreign minister in the conservative-aligned government but Yaqub maintained his composure and his wit in the Zia administration.

As foreign minister, he directed a proactive and keen pro-Islamic policy and supported the U.S. sponsored clandestine program to arm the Afghan mujahideen against Soviet-sponsored Socialist Afghanistan. He advised President Zia-ul-Haq on many key matters and firmly had gripped the country's foreign policy on the track of pro-U.S. foreign policy as many military officers joined his foreign ministry. During this time, the matters were kept out of the sight of the Foreign Office with Yaqub handling matters with the military. He continued his role as foreign minister after the general elections held in 1985 by the Prime Minister Mohammad Junejo.

At foreign fronts, he played a crucial role in providing the support for his country's cover and clandestine nuclear development whilst maintaining a strong policy of deliberate ambiguity. In 1984, he reportedly issued a statement in Washington, D.C., on Pakistan's massive retaliation when observing India's pre-emptive strikes on Pakistan's facilities, and made unsuccessful proposal to United States to put Pakistan under its nuclear umbrella.

In the 1980s, he provided his diplomatic expertise in resolving the Soviet–Afghan War when he explored the possibility of setting-up the interim system of government under former monarch Zahir Shah but this was not authorized by President Zia-ul-Haq. In 1984–85, he paid visits to China, Saudi Arabia, the Soviet Union, France, United States and the United Kingdom to develop framework for the Geneva Accords which was signed in 1988. About the death and state funeral of President Zia-ul-Haq, Yaqub was earlier warned by Soviet Foreign Minister Edward Shevardnadze that Pakistan's support for the Afghan mujahideen "would not go unpunished."

In the 1980s, he also managed to maintain Pakistan's close friendship with Iran and the rich Arab States during the Iran-Iraq war. After the 1988 Pakistani general elections, Benazir Bhutto kept Yaqub as foreign minister.

In 1988–90, he aided Prime Minister Benazir Bhutto to reach agreement to sign an arms control treaty with her Indian counterpart Rajiv Gandhi. In 1990, he met Indian External Minister, I. K. Gujral to deter an active conflict between two countries.

After the 1990 Pakistani general election, Prime Minister Nawaz Sharif made him foreign minister, a position he retained until 1991. He once again put country's foreign policy to supporting U.S.-led invasion of Iraq in the Gulf War. After the Gulf War, Yaqub resigned his post as foreign minister on 26 February 1991.

After his resignation, he went on to join the United Nations when he was named the Special Representative of the Secretary-General for Western Sahara in 1992 which he remained until 1995. In 1996, he was again re-appointed as foreign minister by Prime Minister Benazir Bhutto but it was short-lived when his tenure was cut-short after President Farooq Leghari dismissed Benazir Bhutto's government.

Although he retired from politics in 1997, Yaqub Ali Khan did provide his support to President Pervez Musharraf to stabilise his writ against the government of Prime Minister Nawaz Sharif in 1999 when he visited United States to provide legitimacy of military martial law.

== Post-retirement and death ==
In 1981, he was appointed as the founding chairman of the board of trustees of the Aga Khan University which he chaired for almost two decades until his retirement in 2001. He was also a commissioner in the now retired Carnegie Commission on Preventing Deadly Conflict in New York City, United States.

Yaqub Ali Khan was married to Begum Tuba Khaleeli of the Iranian Khaleeli family of Calcutta with whom he had two sons, Samad and Najib. He died of old age, at 95, on 26 January 2016 in Islamabad where he was laid to rest in Westridge cemetery in Rawalpindi, Punjab, Pakistan. His funeral services were attended by then CJCSC General Rashad Mahmood, then COAS General Raheel Sharif, then Air Chief General Sohail Aman, then Naval Chief Admiral Muhammad Zakaullah and other high-ranking civil and military officials and people from all walks of life.

== Awards and decorations ==
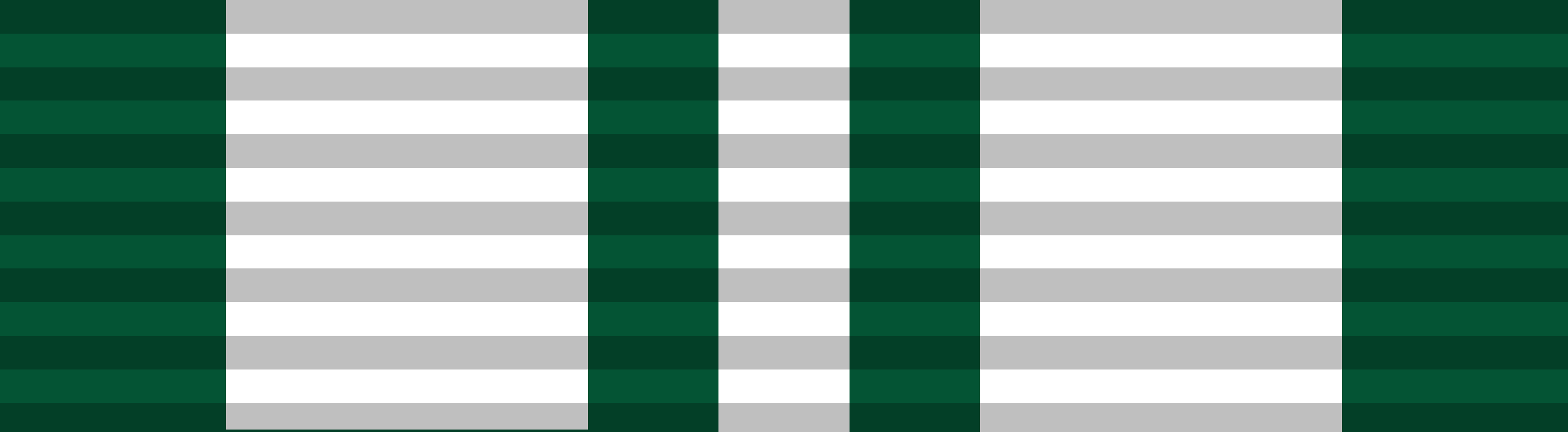

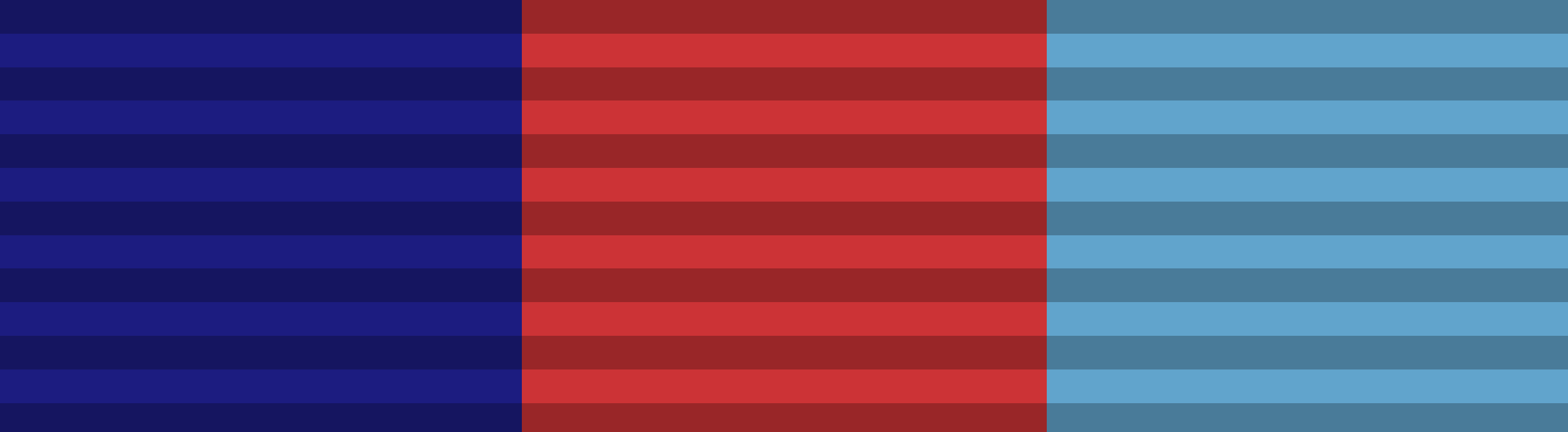

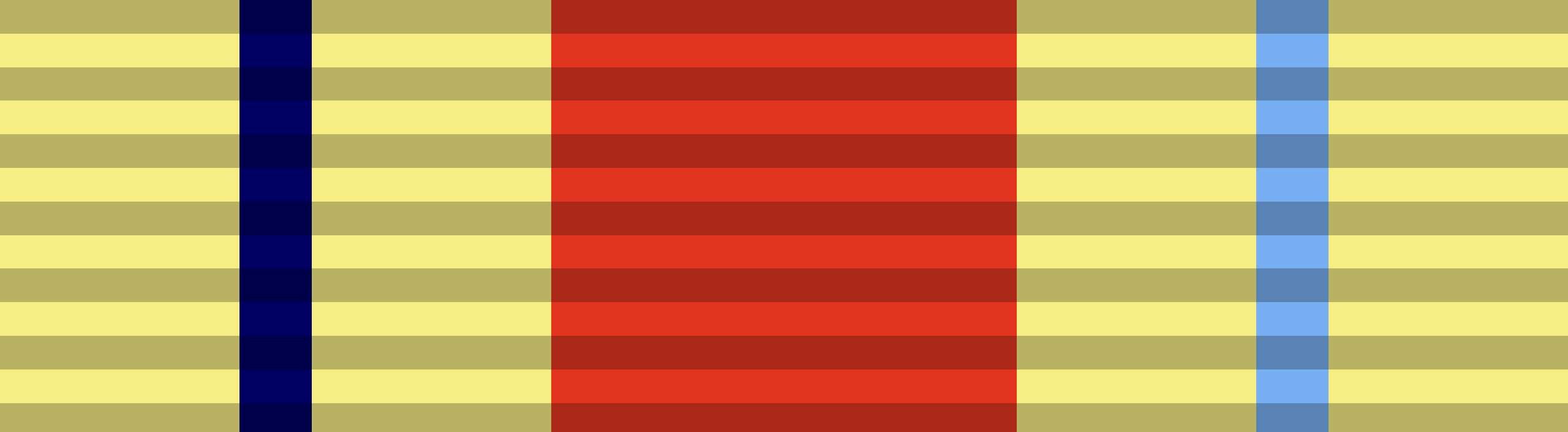

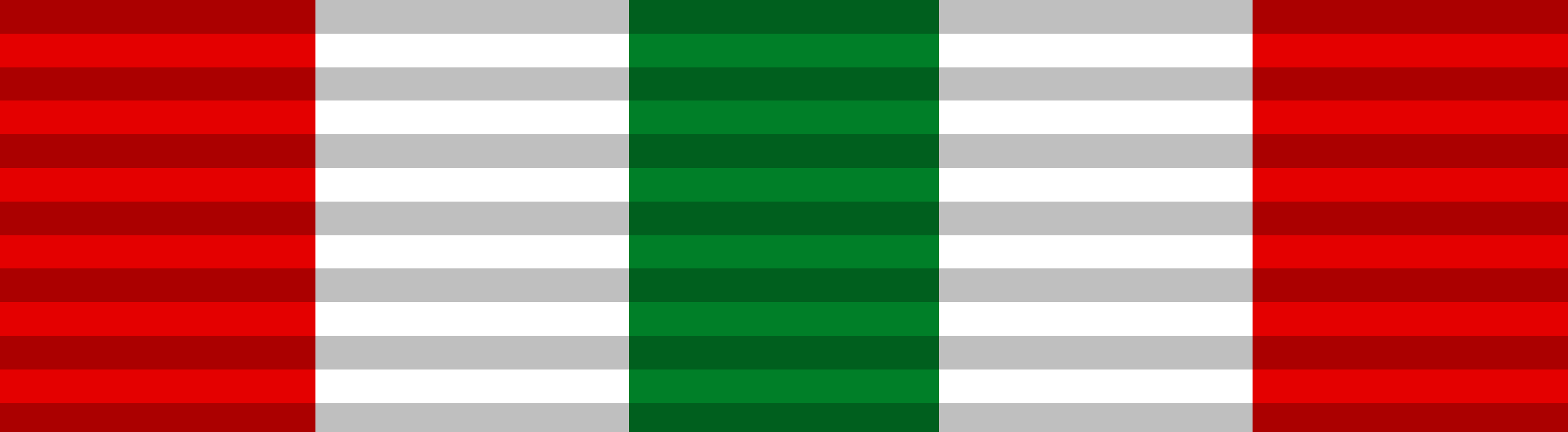

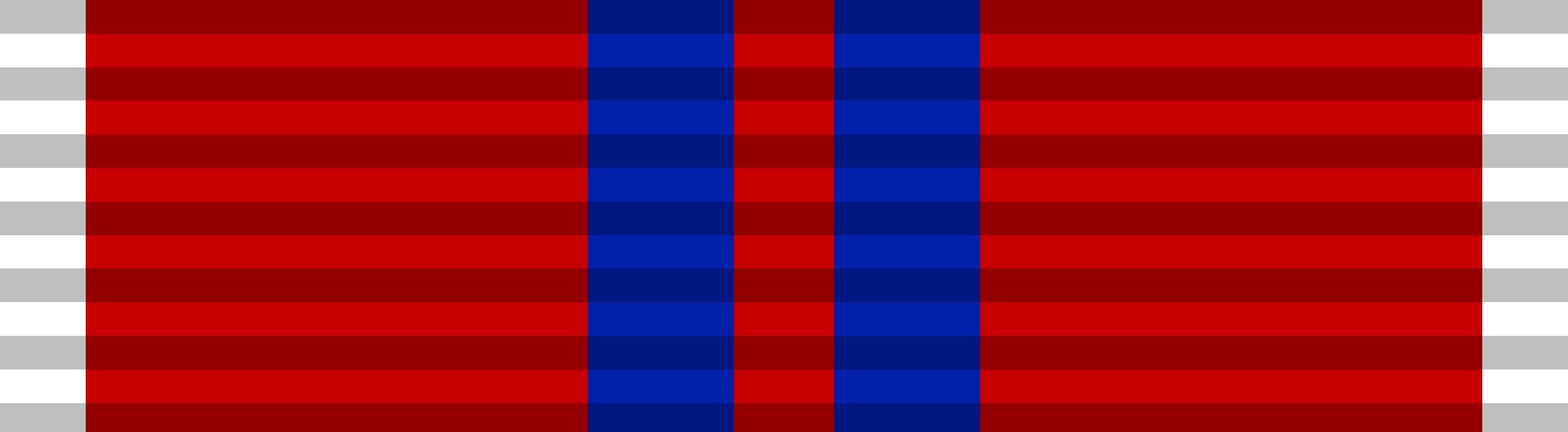

| Sitara-e-Pakistan (SPk) | Tamgha-e-Diffa (General Service Medal) | | Sitara-e-Harb 1965 War (War Star 1965) |
| Tamgha-e-Jang 1965 War (War Medal 1965) | Pakistan Tamgha (Pakistan Medal) 1947 | Tamgha-e-Jamhuria (Republic Commemoration Medal) 1956 | 1939-1945 Star |
| Africa Star | Italy Star | War Medal 1939-1945 | Queen Elizabeth II Coronation Medal (1953) |

=== Foreign decorations ===
Foreign Awards
| UK | 1939-1945 Star |
| UK | Africa Star |
| UK | Italy Star |
| UK | War Medal 1939-1945 |
| UK | Queen Elizabeth II Coronation Medal |
| Jordan | Order of the Star of Jordan |

== Autobiography ==
- Khan, Sahabzada Mohammad Yaqub Ali (2005). Strategy, diplomacy, humanity : life and work of Sahabzada Yaqub-Khan. Karachi: International Forum Takshila Research University. p. 396. ISBN 0-9755860-1-7.

== See also ==
- Special Representative of the Secretary-General for Western Sahara
- Timeline of Afghanistan (1982)

Military offices
| Preceded by Sher Bahadur | Chief of General Staff; 1966–1969 | Succeeded by Gul Hassan Khan |
| Preceded by None | Commander of Eastern Command; 23 August 1969 – 7 March 1971 | Succeeded by Lt Gen Tikka Khan |
Political offices
| Preceded by Muzaffaruddin | Martial Law Administrator, Zone B (East Pakistan); 1969–1971 | Succeeded by Tikka Khan |
| Preceded by Muzaffaruddin | Governor of East Pakistan; 1969 | Succeeded by Syed Mohammad Ahsan |
| Preceded by Syed Mohammad Ahsan | Governor of East Pakistan; 1971 | Succeeded by Tikka Khan |
| Preceded by Agha Shahi | Foreign Minister of Pakistan; 1982–1991 | Succeeded by Abdul Sattar |
| Preceded by Aseff Ahmad Ali | Foreign Minister of Pakistan (caretaker); 1996–1997 | Succeeded by Gohar Ayub Khan |
Diplomatic posts
| Preceded by Sultan Mohammed Khan | Pakistan Ambassador to the United States; 1973–1979 | Succeeded by Sultan Mohammed Khan |
