= William L. Eagleton =

American diplomat

William Lester Eagleton Jr. (August 17, 1926 – January 27, 2011) was a United States Foreign Service Officer and diplomat who served as Ambassador to several Middle Eastern and North African states.

== Early life ==
Born in Peoria, Illinois, Eagleton served in the United States Navy from 1944 to 1946, and graduated from Yale University in 1948. He joined the U.S. foreign service in 1949.

== Diplomatic career ==
Eagleton served as American consul in Tabriz, Iran between 1959 and 1961 and Chargé d’Affaires ad interim to Yemen 1967, Algeria 1969-1974, Tunisia 1977, and Libya 1978–1980, as well as Principal Officer in Iraq 1980–1984 and United States Ambassador to Syria 1984–1988. He is also an author of The Kurdish Republic of 1946 (1961) and "Iraqi Kurdistan" in The World Today (1956).

After his term as Ambassador to Syria ended in 1988, Eagleton worked with the United Nations as Deputy Commissioner-General for Palestinian Refugees (1988–94), Special Coordinator for Sarajevo (1994–1996), and Director of UN Operations in Western Sahara (1999–2001). He rejoined the State Department in 2003 as a special advisor for Northern Iraq. Eagleton died in Peoria in 2011, aged 84.

== Textile publications ==
Eagleton's 1988 book An Introduction to Kurdish Rugs drew from his experience collecting rugs in Baghdad and elsewhere in the Middle East. It remains the standard book on Kurdish pile weavings, which remain relatively unknown even among textile collectors.

== See also ==
- Special Representative of the Secretary-General for Western Sahara

Diplomatic posts
| Preceded by Robert P. Paganelli | United States Ambassador to Syria; 1984–1988 | Succeeded by Edward Peter Djerejian |
