= Thomas Ponsonby (captain) =

Thomas Ponsonby (1660–1717) was an Irish army captain, landowner and landlord of the Crotta (historically also Crotto) estate in County Kerry. He was the first Irish-born landlord in the Ponsonby family line to inherit the estate.

== Biography ==
He was the second son of Rose (née Weldon) of Athy, Kildare and Henry Ponsonby, an adventurer soldier from Cumbria in Oliver Cromwell's army which landed at Dublin in 1649. Henry Ponsonby was confirmed in 1666 as being the new landowner of townlands confiscated from Catholics of Norman descent, largely from the Stack family; he died in 1681. Ponsonby's older brother, John, married Margaret Holmes of Kilmallock and he lived there without issue from his marriage so Thomas Ponsonby inherited the thousands of acres of the Crotta estate. In 1685, Ponsonby's mother sought legal protection against a claim of rent going back years on 1010 acres of the townland of Stack's Mountain - half of its area - by Chidley Coote (d. 1702), Thomas Coote and Thomas Crosbie (d.1694) [The current townland area contains 929.78 acres (376.27 Ha)]. Crosbie had family connexions with the Cootes and the Ponsonbys, but sided with Chidley Coote who'd set out to ruin the Ponsonbys. After several hearings, the court ruled in the Ponsonby's favour, a judgement challenged by Crosbie's son David, but costs drove a settlement for division of properties made after arbitration. On 15 October 1691, Ponsonby and his late father - along with many other prominent landowners and freemen in the country - were attainted by the English Parliament, latterly that of James II (King James landed in Ireland in 1689 having originally fled to France after the arrival of William III in England). The "Act for the Attainder of Divers Rebels, and for Preserving the Interest of Loyal Subjects" was passed in the Irish parliament. The list of names including Ponsonby and his father was printed in The State of the Protestants of Ireland under the late King James's Government, originally by Robert Clavell in London, and 28 years later in a book published in Dublin. His father and uncle - a colonel who rode with Cromwell - had earlier received a pardon under Charles II.

Ponsonby married Susannah Grice of Ballygalane in 1685. They began having children from age 18 onwards, with six surviving, namely Richard, Samuel, Rose, Alice, Honora and Ann. Ponsonby became a captain in the army. Their son Richard became the member of parliament for Kinsale and inherited the Crotta estate upon his father's death). Samuel was killed by a watchman in Cork c. 1729. Rose married John Carrique - a high sheriff of Kerry - and their son Richard inherited the estate after his uncle. Rose, Alice and Honora all married and had children.
