= Brooks Richards =

Sir Francis Brooks Richards, KCMG, DSO, DSC & Bar, LdH, CdG (July 18, 1918 – September 13, 2002) was a director of operations for the Special Operations Executive (SOE) during the Second World War, and subsequently a British diplomat.

== Early life ==
He was born in Southampton on 18 July 1918, the son of an engineer, and educated at Stowe School and Magdalene College, Cambridge where he gained first-class honours in history in 1939.

In 1941, he married Hazel Williams, daughter of Lt-Col. Stanley Price Williams, Indian Army, who was also an SOE officer. They had a son, Francis who was a Governor and Commander-in-Chief of Gibraltar and a director of GCHQ, and a daughter, the author Susan Richards.

== Wartime activities ==
In 1939 he was commissioned into the Royal Naval Volunteer Reserve on the outbreak of war and volunteered for the Royal Navy, commanding a minesweeper and then a motor torpedo boat flotilla. At the outbreak of war, he organised secret service agents for secret Channel crossings to France and across the Mediterranean to land in Tunisia.

On 6 November 1940 he was in command of HMS Sevra when it hit a mine and sank off Falmouth, and in 1941 he was taken on by SOE. He became second-in-command of the Helford Flotilla under Gerry Holdsworth.

At the end of 1942 he was in Algiers when Admiral Darlan was also there at the time of the Allied landings. He met Fernand Bonnier de La Chapelle several times before La Chapelle assassinated Darlan. Brooks Richards always denied that Bonnier de la Chapelle, who moved in Royalist circles, was working for SOE.

In May 1943, after the liberation of Tunis, Commander Brooks Richards was head of F section in Algiers, directing SOE agents parachuted into enemy territory or landed at night on the beaches. In Algiers, he got to know Charles de Gaulle. and wrote an account of this period in his book Secret Flotillas.

In Autumn 1944 he served in the staff of Duff Cooper, minister-resident charged with re-opening the British embassy in Paris, and in 1945 he became a reservist in the Royal Naval Reserve (RNR).

== Post war ==
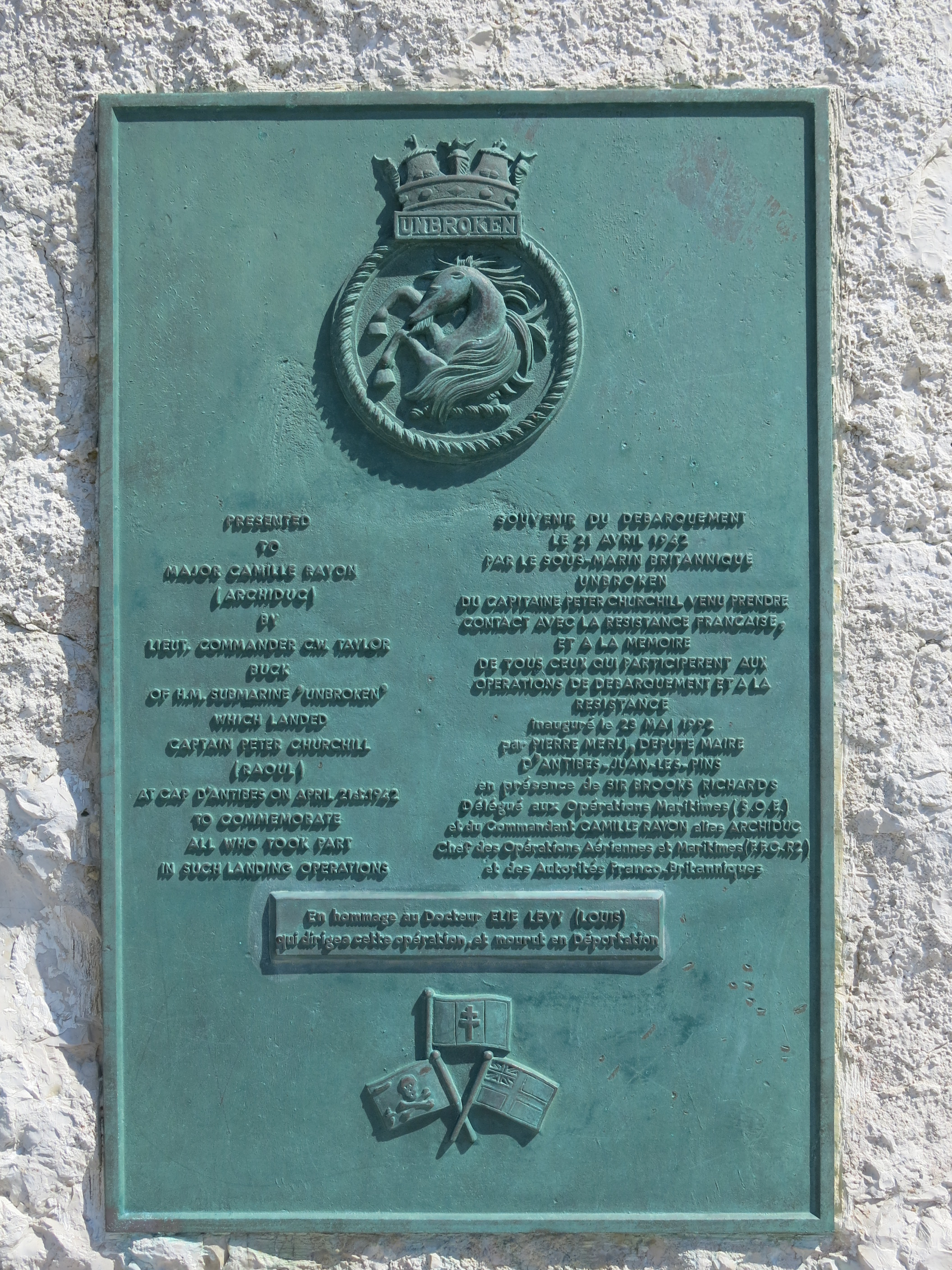
Monument commemorating the landing of Capt. Peter Churchill from HMS Unbroken at Cap d'Antibes on 21 April 1942

Richards attended the unveiling of a monument at Cap d'Antibes commemorating the landing of Capt. Peter Churchill from HMS Unbroken on 21 April 1942.

From 1944 to 1948 he was a press attaché in Paris, and in 1954 he began a diplomatic career, starting as first secretary and head of the administration in the Persian Gulf, a post he held until 1957.

In 1958–59, he was Assistant Private Secretary to the Foreign Secretary, Selwyn Lloyd, before returning to France during De Gaulle's presidency to work as intelligence advisor at the British embassy from 1959 to 1964.

In 1964–65, he was head of the Department of Information Policy and Guidance, Commonwealth Relations Office, and in 1965–69 he was delegated from there to the Cabinet Office, where he was Secretary of the Joint Intelligence Committee, in which role he was succeeded by the intelligence officer Brian Stewart.

From 1969 to 1971, he was in Bonn, before acting as British ambassador in Saigon from 1972 to 1974, during the Vietnam War, then Athens from 1974 to 1978, after the military junta fell from power.

He was deputy secretary to the Cabinet Office from 1978 to 1980, Security Adviser to the Northern Ireland Office in 1980–81 and finally president of CSM Parliamentary Consultants from 1984 until his retirement in 1996.

He helped set up The Gerry Holdsworth Special Forces Trust.

== Death ==
He died in Dorchester on 13 September 2002, aged 84.

== Honours ==
UK		Distinguished Service Order (DSO)
UK		Distinguished Service Cross and Bar (DSC) and Bar
UK	UK Order St-Michael St-George ribbon	Knight Commander of the Order of St Michael and St George (KCMG)
France		Légion d'honneur
France		Croix de Guerre

== Works ==
- Secret Flotillas: the Clandestine Sea Lines to France and French North Africa, HMSO, 1996.
- (revised edition) Vol 1 Secret Flotillas: Clandestine sea operations to Brittany, 1940–1944, Routledge, 2004.
- (revised edition) Vol 2 Secret Flotillas: Clandestine sea operations in the Mediterranean, North Africa and the Adriatic, 1940–1944, Routledge, 2004.
