= Héctor Gros Espiell =

Uruguayan jurist, politician and diplomat

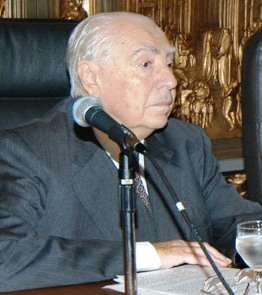
Héctor Gros Espiell.

Héctor Gros Espiell (17 September 1926 in Montevideo – 30 November 2009) was a Uruguayan jurist, politician and diplomat. He served as Minister of Foreign Affairs 1990–1993, during the government of Luis Alberto Lacalle. In 2005 he was Ambassador to France. He also served as judge of the Inter-American Court of Human Rights. In the United Nations, he was a Special Representative of the Secretary-General for Western Sahara.

Gros Espiell was a specialist in international law, particularly international human rights law and international criminal law. He was a lifelong member of the National Party.

His last important professional activity was at The Hague, in the Uruguay River pulp mill dispute.
