= Henry Ponsonby (died 1681) =

Irish Soldier and landowner

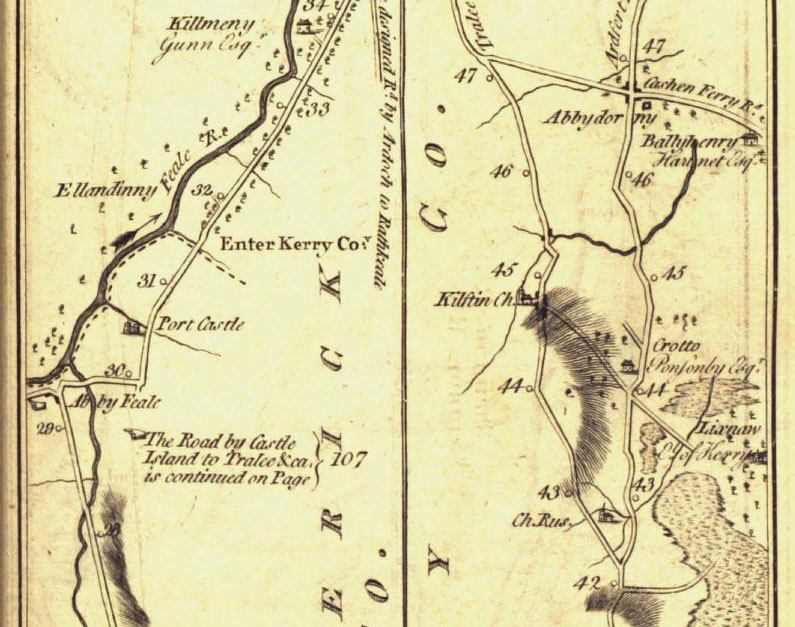
A detail from Taylor and Skinner's map, showing the Ponsonby name associated with Crotta/Crotto

Henry Ponsonby (1620–1681) was a soldier in Oliver Cromwell's army during the Irish Confederate Wars. He became a significant landowner and landlord when he was granted the estates of long-established settlers in County Kerry, notably the Stack family after whom Stack's Mountains are named. His family influenced Kerry politics for the next two centuries.

== Life ==
Ponsonby was born to Dorothy (née Sands) and Henry Ponsonby at Haile Hall, near Whitehaven, Cumberland. He was part of Cromwell's army which invaded Ireland at Dublin in August 1649; his older brother, John, began the campaign as a major and had already been in Ireland a few years. Cromwell's aim was to defeat the alliance of the Catholic Confederacy and English Royalists, the latter having lost to Parliamentarians in Great Britain. The Confederate-Royalist alliance was finally beaten by 1653, but Cromwell's Act of Settlement of Ireland was drawn up the previous year. A national survey, the Down Survey, was carried out by William Petty to facilitate this. Owners of Irish land were dispossessed to varying degrees, some as punishment but in any case to pay the British troops - who had not been paid for 18 months - in lieu of wages. The Stacks, a Catholic family of Norman heritage in Kerry, had supported the Confederacy so all of their land was confiscated. Around Kilflynn and Crotta (which had been known as 'Stackstown') were the townlands owned by James Stack (Garrynagore, Gortclohy and Cloghanaleskirt), John Stack (Aghacoora), Richard Stack (Killaspicktarvin (and eight more northerly townlands)) and Thomas Stack (Gortaneare, Ballyconnell, Castletown, Crotta (also formerly known as 'Crotto'), Glanballyma, Knocknahila, Cloonnafinneela, and Cappagh).

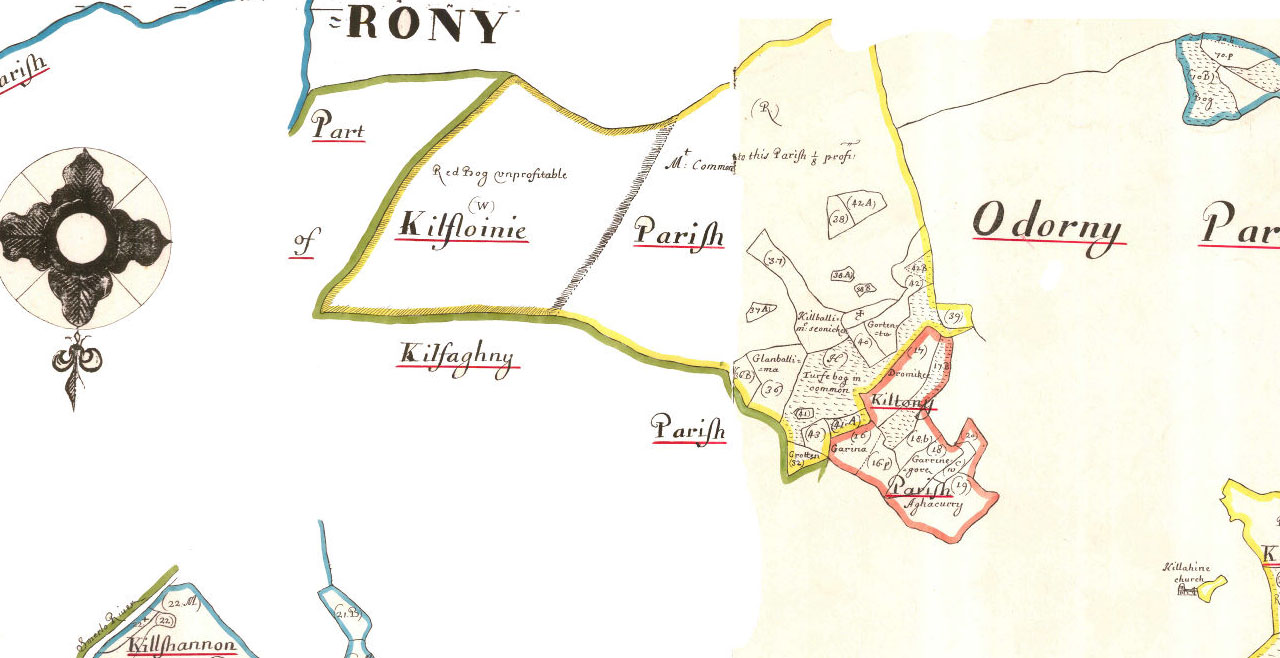
Part of a Down Survey map (1656-58) showing a number of townlands inherited by Ponsonby. Crotta, Ponsonby's home, is to the left of 'Kiltomy Parish'

Following the Stuart Restoration, Ponsonby received a pardon from Charles II for all treasons, rebellions, levying of war etc., committed before and until 29 December 1660. Further changes to the Acts of Settlement were made but the townlands around Kilflynn formerly the property of the Stacks were newly confirmed as the property of Henry Ponsonby by 1666, along with Knocknaglough (240 acres) to the west, taken from another Catholic, Robert FitzMaurice (spelt 'FitzMorris' on the Down Survey); these townlands totalled at least 2000 acres in all.

== Later property challenges ==
Post mortem, Henry Ponsonby, along with his son Thomas Ponsonby, was attainted by the English Parliament and his name published in publicly-available lists in England and Ireland. With this, and notwithstanding family links, in the next few years claims were made by (Chidley Coote, Thomas Coote and Thomas Crosbie) that Ponsonby had been let land owned by Coote on Stack's Mountain two decades previously and failed to pay agreed rent. After several court appearances, a ruling was issued in favour of the Ponsonbys which was challenged but the case was eventually settled out of court, after which the family became very influential in Irish national affairs.

== Crotta (Crotto) House ==
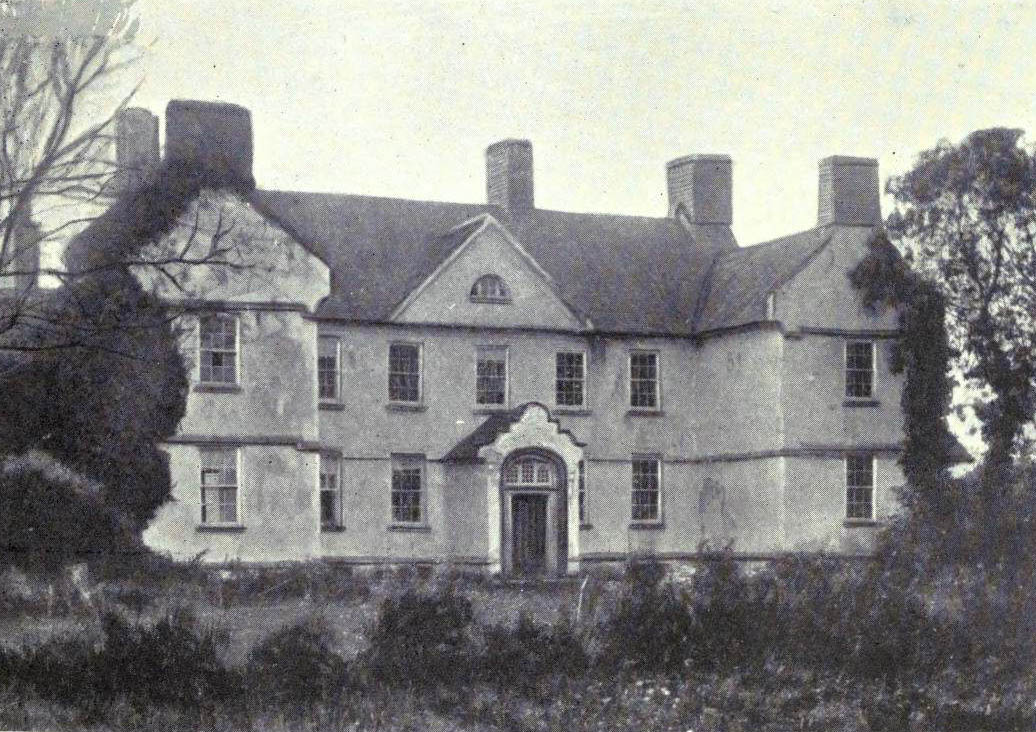
Crotta house in 1902. Extensions were added after the original build.

Ponsonby made the townland of Crotta the site for his home seat and built Crotta House there in 1669 in what was regarded as an Elizabethan style. It is named "Crotto" by Mark Bence-Jones in A Guide to Irish Country Houses.

Henry Ponsonby died at Crotta in 1681, aged 61 years survived by his wife; his son Thomas inherited his property. He is remembered as a poor landlord in local Irish folklore.

== Family ==
Ponsonby married Rose Weldon of St. John's Bower near Athy, County Kildare, daughter of Mary Newman and Thomas Weldon whose family had a history of local representation in Kildare and English parliamentary and royal service going back to Henry VII. They had seven sons and eleven daughters; ten reached maturity, namely John, Thomas, Henry, Dorothy, Mary, Jane, Honora, Anne, Eleanor and Sarah. Ponsonby's property was organised both as farmland and wood plantations.
