= Richard Ponsonby (politician) =

MP for Kinsale
- In office 1731–1760
- Preceded by: Gervais Parker
- Succeeded by: Edward Southwell

Personal details
- Party: Whig

Richard Ponsonby (c.1678 – 29 November 1763) was an Irish member of parliament (MP) for a County Cork constituency and a justice of the peace (JP) for County Kerry.

He was the first of six surviving children of Susannah (née Grice) and Thomas Ponsonby of Crotta, where his family had been the landowners for two generations after the Cromwellian conquest of Ireland. He was educated at Trinity College Dublin. His first marriage was to Helen Meade, third surviving child of Elizabeth (née Butler) and Sir John Meade, on 11 January 1711; she died on 28 March 1743. His second marriage was to Arabella Blennerhassett (b.21 December 1726), 48 years his junior, daughter of Jane (née Denny) and Colonel John Blennerhassett of Ballyseedy. Blennerhassett had made an agreement with Maurice Crosbie of Ardfert and Arthur Denny (politician) of Tralee to partition the county representation amongst the families. The Ponsonbys at Crotta and other southern counties benefited from these agreements through marriage and other arrangements; Ponsonby's family, despite being tainted by legal disputes in his father's earlier years, became in favour with and increasingly influential within the Irish government. Notwithstanding this, Ponsonby had no children by either marriage.

In 1731, he became the MP for Kinsale, a borough constituency of County Cork; he remained as the constituency MP until 1760. For different years during this time, he was also one of the JPs in Kerry. As he was without issue from his marriages, in 1762 he willed his Crotta estate to his nephew William Carrique (son of his sister Rose and James Carrique) with the agreement that Carrique and his son, James, should take his name; their surname became Carrique Ponsonby.
