= Anne Ponsonby =

British telegraphist (1924–2023)

Anne Veronica Theresa Ponsonby (23 December 1924 – 3 October 2023) was a British telegraphist known for her contributions during World War II.

== Early life and education ==
Born in Peshawar, then part of the British India, she was the youngest of three daughters of Brigadier Francis Herbert Maynard and Ethel Bates. She was educated at New Hall School, a convent school in Essex, England, after spending her early years in India.

== Career ==
During World War II, Ponsonby joined the First Aid Nursing Yeomanry (FANY), which, despite its origins in medical support, served as a recruitment pool for the Special Operations Executive (SOE), an organisation tasked with espionage and reconnaissance in German-occupied Europe. She underwent intensive training as a Morse code operator and coder, eventually achieving a high level of proficiency.

Ponsonby's work was critical in maintaining secure communications with SOE agents in occupied Europe, especially as the enemy enhanced their techniques for detecting radio transmissions. Her duties primarily involved encrypted communication between SOE's wireless station at Grendon Underwood and its London headquarters, a role that was pivotal for the success of missions and the safety of agents on the ground.

On 6 June 1944, D-Day, Ponsonby received clear-text Morse messages celebrating the Allied invasion, an event that stood out in her career. After the war, she returned to India briefly before joining the Secret Intelligence Service (MI6), which led to her marriage to Myles Ponsonby, a Foreign Office official. Her life thereafter included various postings abroad due to her husband's diplomatic career.

== Awards and recognition ==
In recognition of her wartime service, Ponsonby was awarded the Légion d'honneur in 2019, highlighting her contributions to the Allied efforts during World War II.
