= John Ponsonby (RAF officer) =

Royal Air Force pilot (1955–2022)

Air Vice-Marshal John Ponsonby OBE
- Born: 8 August 1955
- Died: 22 October 2022 (aged 67)
- Military career
- Allegiance: United Kingdom
- Branch: British Army (1975–1983); Royal Air Force (1983–2007)
- Service years: 1975–2007
- Rank: Air vice-marshal
- Service number: 498938 (Army); 5205086M (RAF)
- Commands: No. 22 (Training) Group; Training Group; Air Cadets; RAF Aldergrove; Support Helicopter Force; No. 27 Squadron; No. 78 Squadron
- Conflicts: Operation Banner
- Awards: Officer of the Order of the British Empire; Queen's Commendation for Valuable Service
- Other work: Senior Vice President Training, AgustaWestland

Air Vice-Marshal John Maurice Maynard Ponsonby (8 August 1955 – 21 October 2022) was a British businessman and a senior officer of the Royal Air Force.

== Background ==
Ponsonby was born on 8 August 1955 to Myles Ponsonby (1924–1999) and his wife Anne Veronica Theresa Maynard (1924–2023). Charles Ponsonby, 2nd Baron de Mauley, was his great-great-grandfather. He had two sisters.

== Military career ==
=== British Army ===
After graduating from the Royal Military Academy Sandhurst, he was commissioned into the Royal Green Jackets as a second lieutenant on 8 March 1975. He was promoted to lieutenant on 8 March 1977, and to captain on 8 September 1981. During his time in the Army he was attached to the Army Air Corps in Germany flying Gazelle Helicopters. He relinquished his commission on 7 March 1983, therefore retiring from the British Army.

=== Royal Air Force ===
Ponsonby was commissioned into the Royal Air Force in April 1983 as a pilot, after nine years service as an infantry officer in the British Army. On 10 April 1983, he was appointed to a permanent commission and promoted to flight lieutenant with seniority from 10 March 1980. On 1 July 1988, he was promoted to squadron leader, and then to wing commander on 1 January 1994. As a group captain, he was appointed an Officer of the Order of the British Empire in the 1999 New Year Honours, and was made an aide-de-camp to Queen Elizabeth II on 1 August 2001. He relinquished this appointment on 3 May 2002, being promoted to air commodore on 1 July that year. Ponsonby was also awarded the Queen's Commendation for Valuable Service in the 2002 Operational Honours List "in recognition of gallant and distinguished services in Northern Ireland during the period 1 October 2001 to 31 March 2002". He was promoted to his final rank of air vice marshal on 4 January 2005.

Ponsonby served as a support helicopter pilot throughout his career, and as a helicopter and tactics instructor. He commanded No. 78 Squadron in the Falkland Islands, No. 27 Squadron in the UK, the Support Helicopter Force in Bosnia and RAF Aldergrove/Joint Helicopter Force in Northern Ireland.

Ponsonby held staff appointments at group, command and ministry level, including as deputy principal staff officer to the Chief of the Defence Staff (General Sir Charles Guthrie), and latterly as air officer plans at Headquarters Strike Command.

Ponsonby was a graduate of the RAF Staff College and the Joint Service Command and Staff College.

Ponsonby was appointed air officer commanding Training Group on 4 January 2005 and became air officer commanding No. 22 (Training) Group on 30 October 2006.

== Later career ==
It was announced on 16 January 2007 that Ponsonby was to be chief of staff operations, Headquarters Air Command, from July 2007. He chose instead to leave military service to take a commercial role as senior vice president training, AgustaWestland.

== Personal life and death ==
Ponsonby was married to Marie Jose Antoinette Van Huizen-Husselson from 1980. They had three children, Charlotte Emma (born 1982), Luke Myles William (born 1986) and Francesca Sarah (born 1986).

Ponsonby died from cancer on 22 October 2022, at the age of 67.

Military offices
Preceded by David Walker	Air Officer Commanding Air Cadets; 2005–2006	Role disbanded
Preceded by David Walker	Air Officer Commanding Training Group; 2005–2006	Role disbanded
New title Group reestablished	Air Officer Commanding No. 22 (Training) Group; 2006–2007	Succeeded by Richard Garwood
