= Mr Ponsonby =

- Author: Ian Middleton
- Cover artist: Murray Grimsdale
- Language: English
- Publisher: Lyndon
- Publication date: 1989
- Publication place: New Zealand
- Media type: Print (Paperback)
- Pages: 160 pp
- ISBN: 0-86470-028-8
- OCLC: 21096645

Mr Ponsonby is the fourth novel from noted New Zealand author Ian Middleton, and is described as "his eulogy to a gentrifying Ponsonby". He had an intimate connection with Ponsonby (a suburb in Auckland, New Zealand), where the book is set, beginning in 1942 and returning to live there in later life. It is the story of a man driven by greed, willing to destroy the character and nature of a lively, spirited community for the sake of a dollar. Mr Ponsonby "vividly recreates the atmosphere and characters of an Auckland suburb threatened by reconstruction" and the clash between the proponents of progress, development and gentrification and the inhabitants of an established community with its own unique character.

== Reviews ==
- Richards, Ian. New Zealand Listener 126 (2608), p. 126; 5 March 1990.
- McLean, Gavin. Otago Daily Times p. 28; 14 June 1989.
- King, Michael. Metro 9(96):184-186; June 1989.
- Reynolds, Ted. New Zealand Herald 2:6; 25 February 1989.
