= Myles Ponsonby =

British diplomat (1924–1999)

Myles Ponsonby CBE

British Ambassador to the Mongolian People's Republic
- In office 1974–1977

Wiltshire County Councillor for Idmiston
- In office 1988–1993

Personal details
- Born: 12 September 1924
- Died: 1 February 1999 (age 74)
- Education: St. Aubyns Preparatory School, Rottingdean, Eton College
- Awards: Commander of the Order of the British Empire

Myles Walter Ponsonby CBE (12 September 1924 – 1 February 1999), was a British soldier, intelligence officer, diplomat and politician. He was Ambassador to Mongolia from 1974 to 1977.

== Early life ==
The son of Victor Coope Ponsonby MC and Gladys Edith Walter, Ponsonby was educated at St Aubyns, Rottingdean, and at Eton College.

== Career ==
Ponsonby served in the British Army from 1942 to 1949 and was wounded on active service during the Second World War. He became an instructor at the Army's School of Infantry, in Warminster, in 1945, and was an intelligence officer in Palestine before a posting to GHQ Middle East. He retired the service with the rank of captain in the King's Royal Rifle Corps.

In 1951, he entered the British government's Foreign Service, later transferring to the Diplomatic Service, and held posts in Egypt (1951), Cyprus (1952–53), Beirut (1953–56), Djakarta (1958–61), and Nairobi (1963–64). In 1964, he went to Hanoi as Consul-General, and was in London at the Foreign Office from 1966 to 1969. He was then head of the office of the Secret Intelligence Service (MI6) in Rome from 1969 to 1971, returned again to London to serve in the newly merged Foreign and Commonwealth Office from 1972 to 1974, was British Ambassador to the Mongolian People's Republic for three years, 1974–1977, and simultaneously an observer for MI6. He ended his official career with a further posting to the FCO from 1977 to 1980.

In 1988, following his retirement, he began a new career as a member of Wiltshire County Council representing Idmiston, serving until 1993. He retired from the council, moved to Winchester, in Hampshire, and died on 1 February 1999.

In 1951, Ponsonby married Anne Veronica Theresa Maynard, a daughter of Brigadier Francis Herbert Maynard CB DSO MC. They had one son, John Maurice Maynard (1955), and two daughters, Belinda Mary (1951) and Emma Christina (1959). Anne Ponsonby died in 2023.

== Honours ==
- Commander of the Order of the British Empire, 1966
