= Daphne Park =

British spy (1921–2010)

The Right Honourable The Baroness Park of Monmouth CMG OBE FRSL
- Known for: SIS officer
- Born: 1 September 1921; Surrey, England
- Died: 24 March 2010 (aged 88)
- Park's voice from the BBC programme MI6: A Century in the Shadows, 3 August 2009

Member of the House of Lords
- Lord Temporal
- Life peerage 27 February 1990 – 24 March 2010

Daphne Margaret Sybil Désirée Park, Baroness Park of Monmouth CMG OBE FRSA (1 September 1921 – 24 March 2010) was a British intelligence officer, diplomat and public servant. During her career as a clandestine senior controller in MI6 (1943–1993) she was stationed in Austria (1946-1948), Moscow (1954–1956), the Congo (1959–1961), Zambia (1964–1967) and Hanoi (1969–1971).

== Early life and education ==
Daphne Park was born to John Alexander and Doreen Gwynneth Park. Her father had contracted tuberculosis as a young man and was sent to Africa for rest and recuperation. He moved from South Africa to Nyasaland (now Malawi), and served as an intelligence officer during World War II. Thereafter he owned a tobacco plantation and worked as an alluvial gold prospector in Tanganyika (now Tanzania). When Daphne was six months old she travelled to Africa with her mother to join him there. Park had a brother, David, who died aged 14.

When Park was 11, she returned to England and was educated at Rosa Bassett School in Streatham and at Somerville College, Oxford, where she graduated with a B.A. in modern languages in 1943. She was further educated at Newnham College, Cambridge, where she received a Certificate of Competent Knowledge in Russian in 1952.

== Career ==
On graduating in 1943, Park turned down jobs in the Treasury and the Foreign Office to make a direct contribution to the war effort. She then joined the First Aid Nursing Yeomanry (FANY). During the selection process for FANY, she came to the attention of the Special Operations Executive (SOE), due to her understanding of ciphers. Park was promoted to the rank of sergeant and trained groups of operatives for Operation Jedburgh, whose task was to support the Resistance in Europe. In 1945 Park went to work as a briefing and dispatching officer in North Africa. On her return in 1946 she was sent to Vienna to establish an office for the Field Intelligence Agency Technical (FIAT), a unit of the Allied Commission responsible for tracking down former Axis scientists.

In 1948, she was attached to the Foreign Office, while actually working for the Secret Intelligence Service (SIS, aka MI6), becoming Third Secretary of the United Kingdom's delegation to NATO in 1952. She then became Second Secretary of the British Embassy in Moscow between 1954 and 1956.

From 1959 to 1961 she was Consul and First Secretary to Léopoldville, which in practice meant being head of MI6 there. British parliamentarian David Lea wrote that shortly before she died, she claimed to have been involved in organising the abduction and murder of Patrice Lumumba during the Congo Crisis. Park (allegedly) confided to Lea that the reasoning behind the assassination was MI6 fears that Lumumba would hand over the high-value Katangese uranium deposits of Shinkolobwe as well as the diamonds and other important minerals largely located in the secessionist eastern state of Katanga to the Soviet Union. The Shinkolobwe uranium mine provided the uranium used by the Manhattan Project, including in atomic bombs dropped on the Japanese cities of Hiroshima and Nagasaki in 1945.

She rose further through the ranks of the Foreign Office to serve in the British High Commission in Lusaka from 1964 to 1967 and then Consul-General to Hanoi from 1969 to 1970. In 1972 she was Chargé d'Affaires of the British Embassy of Ulaanbaatar for several months. From 1973 onwards she served in the Foreign Office then retired two years early in 1979 to become Principal of Somerville College, Oxford.

Despite her known intelligence service, SIS would neither confirm nor deny she was under their employment.

== Affiliations ==
- 1971–72, Honourable Research Fellow at the University of Kent
- 1980–89, Principal of Somerville College
- 1982–87, Governor of the British Broadcasting Corporation (BBC)
- 1983–89, Member, British Library Board
- 1984–90, chairman, Lord Chancellor's Advisory Committee on Legal Aid
- 1985–89, Pro-Vice-Chancellor, University of Oxford
- 1989–90, director, Zoo Development Trust
- 1989–94, chairman, Royal Commission on the Historical Monuments of England
- 1991–92, Trustee, Royal Armouries Development Trust
- 1994–96, Member, Forum UK
- 1994–2010, President, Society for the Promotion of the Training of Women
- 2003, Patron, Action Congo
- Member, Royal Asiatic Society
- Governor, Ditchley Foundation
- Trustee/Patron, Great Britain-Sasakawa Foundation
- Trustee, Jardine Educational Trust
- Trustee, Lucy Faithfull Travel Scholarship Fund

== Honours and awards ==
In 1960, Park was invested as an Officer of the Order of the British Empire (OBE) for her service as Consul to Leopoldville. In 1971 she was invested as a Companion of the Order of St Michael and St George (CMG) for her service as Consul-General to Hanoi. On 27 February 1990, she was created a life peer Baroness Park of Monmouth, of Broadway in the County of Hereford and Worcester, and served as SIS's semi-official spokesperson in the House of Lords. According to Lord Rooker, Park told him that her choice of 'Monmouth' in her title was unconnected with the market town of Monmouth but chosen to honour Monmouth House, a building in which her friends in the Secret Intelligence Service worked. She was an Honorary Fellow of Somerville College, Oxford, and a Fellow of Chatham House (RIIA) and of the Royal Society of Arts (FRSA).

== Personal life ==
Park was unmarried and had no children. She died after a long illness on 24 March 2010, aged 88. A Service of Thanksgiving for the Life and Work of Baroness Park was held on Tuesday 26 October 2010 and the eulogy was given by fellow ex-spy Sir Mark Allen, CMG.

Academic offices
Preceded by Barbara Craig	Principal; Somerville College, Oxford; 1980–1989	Succeeded by Catherine Pestell
