= Wolfgang Weisbrod-Weber =

Wolfgang Weisbrod-Weber (born in Germany in 1955) was the United Nations Secretary-General's Special Representative and Head of the United Nations Mission for the Referendum in Western Sahara (MINURSO) on 15 June 2012.

Weisbrod-Weber has extensive experience in United Nations peacekeeping operations (Namibia, Iraq, Bosnia-Herzegovina, Timor-Leste, etc). Since 2008, he has been the Director in charge of Asia and the Middle East in the Department of Peacekeeping Operations of the UN.

Weisbrod-Weber was twice the interim head of UNAMA in Afghanistan, in 2009 and 2010.
