= Julian Harston =

Diplomat, peacekeeper, lecturer and mentor (born 1942)

Julian Harston (born 20 October 1942 in Nairobi, Kenya), son of Colonel Clive Harston, King's African Rifles, is an independent consultant on International Peace and Security matters. He retired as an Assistant Secretary-General in the United Nations. His last post was as the Representative of the Secretary-General in Belgrade, Serbia. Prior to this until March 2009 he was the Special Representative of the Secretary-General heading MINURSO Western Sahara.

For 25 years, he was a member of Her Majesty's Diplomatic Service. He completed his secondary education at The King's School, Canterbury, England. He then earned a Bachelor of Science in Politics from the University of London and a degree in African Politics from the University of Rhodesia (University College of Rhodesia and Nyasaland).

Harston lectures all over the world to distinguished military and civilian audiences, and takes a leading role in War Games and Exercises for NATO, Pinnacle/Pyramid in Riga and for the UK, most recently Joint Venture 2018 in Cyprus, German, Serbian, Swedish, Canadian and Ugandan armed forces. He is a member of the Advisory Panel of the United Kingdom Joint Services Command and Staff College, where he mentors the Higher Command and Staff Course, and lectures at Cranfield University. In January 2012, Harston delivered a Strategic Review for the UN Security Council on UNIFIL, the peacekeeping operation in Lebanon. Harston lectures at the Ignacy Jan Paderewski Polish Institute of Diplomacy and at the NATO School in Oberammergau, and at the University of Belgrade and the Foreign Ministry Diplomatic School, and at Singidunum University. He also writes for Politika, Serbia's leading newspaper, and Nin, weekly. He is a member of the advisory board of www.Confluxcentre.org Belgrade.

In August 2013, he was asked to make a presentation to the government committee reviewing Swiss Security Policy in Bern Switzerland. He publishes papers on peacekeeping and international diplomacy.

Harston is a member of the East India Club and the Special Forces Club.

He is married with one son, and two step daughters and five grandchildren. His other interests include Early English Church music and a 1952 Series One Land Rover.

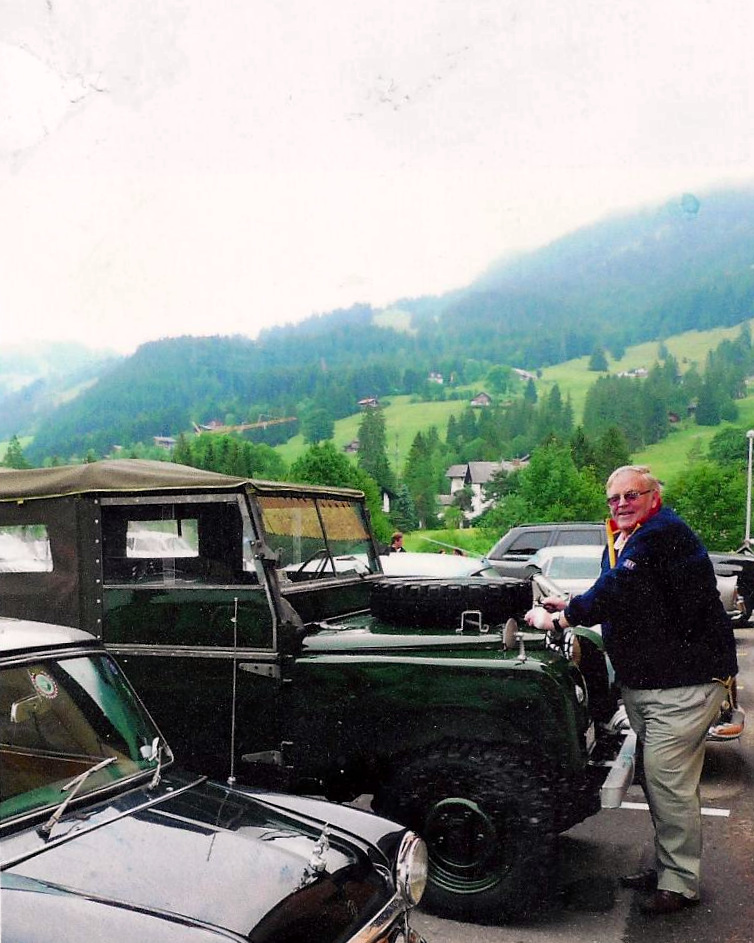
1952 Land Rover on rally in Swiss mountains 2013

== Publications ==
- Responding to Crises. Are Present Policies & Practices the Answer?, Policy Options, March 2001, Canadian Institute for Research on Public Policy, Ottawa, 2001, available online (pdf)
- The Experience of East Timor, Japan Institute of International Affairs, July 2002
- What Makes a Peacekeeping Success Story? RUSI Australia, Global Security in the New Millennium, October 2003
- The United Nations as Government: Eastern Slavonia, Kosovo and East Timor. Institute of Policy Studies (Singapore) and UNITAR, 2005
- Adapting the UN to the post-modern era – the case of Haiti. Palgrave Macmillan, 2005
- Kosovo and Metohija: Living in the Enclave. (Contributor) Institut des Etudes Balkaniques. Belgrade 2007, available online (pdf)
- New Serbia, new NATO - future vision for the 21st Century. Nova Srbija, novi NATO – vizija budućnosti za 21.vek., Trans Conflict Belgrade 2011
- Peacekeeping and Peace support Swiss Security Policy Hearings 2013, Bern 2013
- Sweden. A world power in Peacekeeping International Military Chaplains' Conference, Stockholm 2013
- Peacekeeping in 2016. Defence Academy of the United Kingdom, Swedish National Defence College, Norwegian Military Academy, Canadian Forces College, and the Uganda Senior Command and Staff College
- Risk Analysis and Intelligence Assessment in Peacekeeping: A Necessity. Swedint 2016, Norwegian Defence and Staff College 2009 and 2010

== Career ==
- 1969–1971 Television and radio broadcaster in Vancouver, British Columbia, Canada
- Career member of Her Majesty's Diplomatic Service 1971–1995 Postings in London and overseas (including Hanoi, North Vietnam & Blantyre, Malawi)
- 1982–1984 Counsellor, British Embassy, Lisbon, Portugal
- 1984–1989 Counsellor, British High Commission, Harare, Zimbabwe
- 1989–1992 Crisis support liaison with the United Kingdom Ministry of Defence
- 1992–1995 Senior Counsellor of the Permanent Mission of the United Kingdom to the United Nations in Geneva, Switzerland

Joined United Nations

- 1995–1996 Head of the Political Unit of the Special Representative of the Secretary General, United Nations Peace Forces (UNPROFOR)in the Former Yugoslavia. Later Head of Political and Civil Affairs for UN Peace Forces Zagreb, Croatia.
- 1996–1997 Director of the United Nations Liaison Office, Belgrade, Yugoslavia
- 1997–1999 Special Representative of the Secretary-General in Haiti Head of Mission, Mission de Police des Nations Unies en Haiti,
- 1999 – April 2001 Deputy Special Representative of the Secretary-General United Nations Mission in Bosnia & Herzegovina Sarajevo
- April–October 2001 Director, Post UNTAET Planning, United Nations Transitional Administration in East Timor (UNTAET)
- October 2001 – April 2004 Director, Asia and Middle East Division, DPKO United Nations Headquarters, New York
- April 2004 – February 2007 Director, UN Office in Belgrade, Serbia
- March 2007 Appointed Assistant Secretary-General
- March 2007 – March 2009 Special Representative of the Secretary-General Head of Mission, MINURSO, Western Sahara
- March–November 2009 Representative of the Secretary-General Director, United Nations Office, Belgrade
- November 2009 – Director, www.harstonconsulting.rs, Serbia. Professor, College of Security and Diplomacy, Belgrade
- June 2010 - Advisory Board Member Trans Conflict Serbia
- March 2012 - Director Milharbour (pvt) Jersey CI
- 12 December 2012 - Founder Member of the Advisory Panel to the Joint Services Command and Staff College, UK
