= John Ponsonby (colonel) =

John Ponsonby (1608–1678) was a colonel in Oliver Cromwell's army during the Irish Confederate Wars, a member of parliament for two different Irish counties following the Parliamentarian's victory and a significant landowner granted confiscated properties in Counties Donegal, Kilkenny and Limerick.

== Biography ==
He was born in 1608 at Haugh-Heale, near Whitehaven, Cumberland, the son of Dorothy Sands and Henry Ponsonby. He was listed as the proprietor of lands at Iverk, Kilkenny in 1641, but not resident there. He arrived at Drogheda in 1641, captain of a group of seventy-five which joined Sir Henry Tichborne's regiment the following year. In 1645, he and others plotted to seize Drogheda and place it under the control of the Scots but he was arrested when the plot was foiled and imprisoned in Dublin. The English Parliament negotiated his release. On his return to England, he commanded a cavalry regiment of the northern army. On 15 June 1647, he raised a regiment of horse for the English Commonwealth, having first petitioned Parliament. The regiment arrived in Ireland a few months later and in 1649 was amalgamated into Charles Coote's regiment under the direction of Cromwell; Ponsonby's younger brother, Henry was a regular soldier in the army. Cromwell aimed to suppress the alliance of the Catholic Confederacy and the previously defeated English Royalists. Ponsonby was made governor of Dundalk in 1649 and impressed Cromwell with his strategy to capture Carrick in November that year. During the campaign, he was promoted from major to colonel. The English army had won by 1653, but the Act of Settlement of Ireland had been prepared the year before and required a property survey, the Down Survey, which was executed by William Petty. Landowners were variously dispossessed, some as punishment for supporting the Confederation. The land was redistributed as payment in lieu of wages for the British soldiers, who had been without pay for 18 months. Ponsonby was appointed as a commissioner to receive depositions from Protestants concerning "murders" committed by the Irish during the battles. Between 1654 and 1655, he was sheriff of Wicklow and Kildare. When Charles II was installed as King of England in 1660, Ponsonby was appointed a commissioner on 19 March for executing the king's declaration for the settlement of Ireland. He became a member of parliament for Kilkenny from 1661 to 1666, was knighted and as "Sir John Ponsonby of Kidalton" became member of parliament for Tipperary the following year.

In 1662, he received a pardon from for any treasons, rebellions, levying of war etc., committed before and until 29 December 1660, a pardon which applied equally to his younger brother. He also received two grants of lands under the settlement that he was instrumental in arranging. He received properties of a townland in Dublin county, two townlands in Limerick, sixteen in Donegal and forty-six in Kilkenny, particularly the castle and lands of the Kidalton Estate in Kilkenny which alone included 3223 acres previously owned by the Dalton family. Those dispossessed of the many thousands of acres involved were a mixture of Protestants and Catholics. He received land in County Donegal from debentures purchased from others. He also had a grant of lands in the same barony - Clanmaurice - that his younger brother Henry had benefited from, but his own claim was overriden by that of Colonel David Crosbie. Additionally, he had to surrender part of his estate when some of the Butler family was restored.

Ponsonby renamed Kidalton Castle as Bessborough House in honour of his second wife Elizabeth ('Bess') (née Folliott), daughter of Anne Strode and Henry Folliott (the current house, now Kidalton College, was built seventy-seven years after his death). They had three children, Elizabeth, Henry and William (who was the first in the Ponsonby line of earls). Ponsonby died in 1678, aged 60, and was buried in the church at Fiddown.
