= Crotta, County Kerry =

Crotta Irish: Crota
- townland
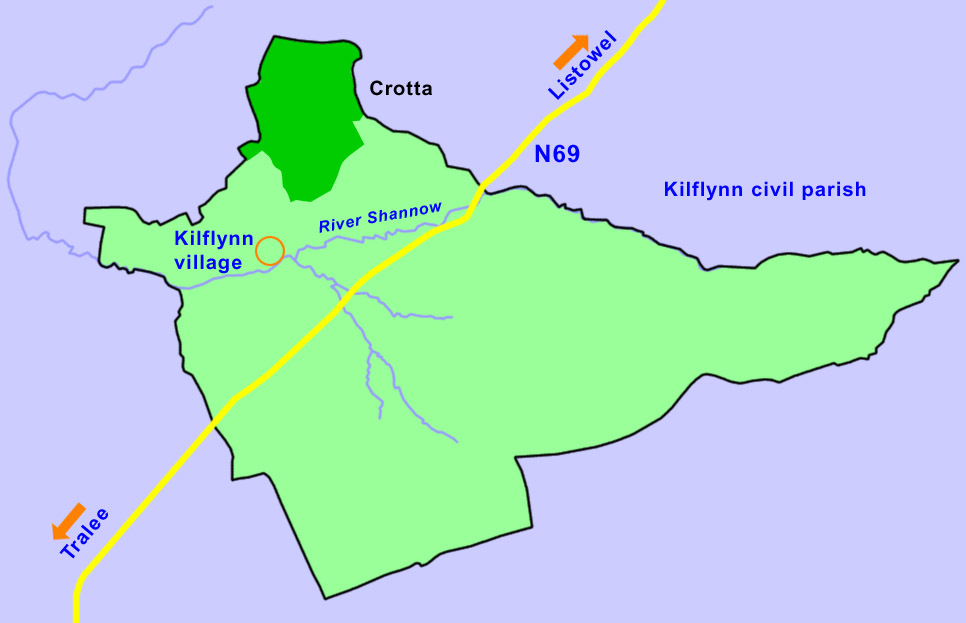

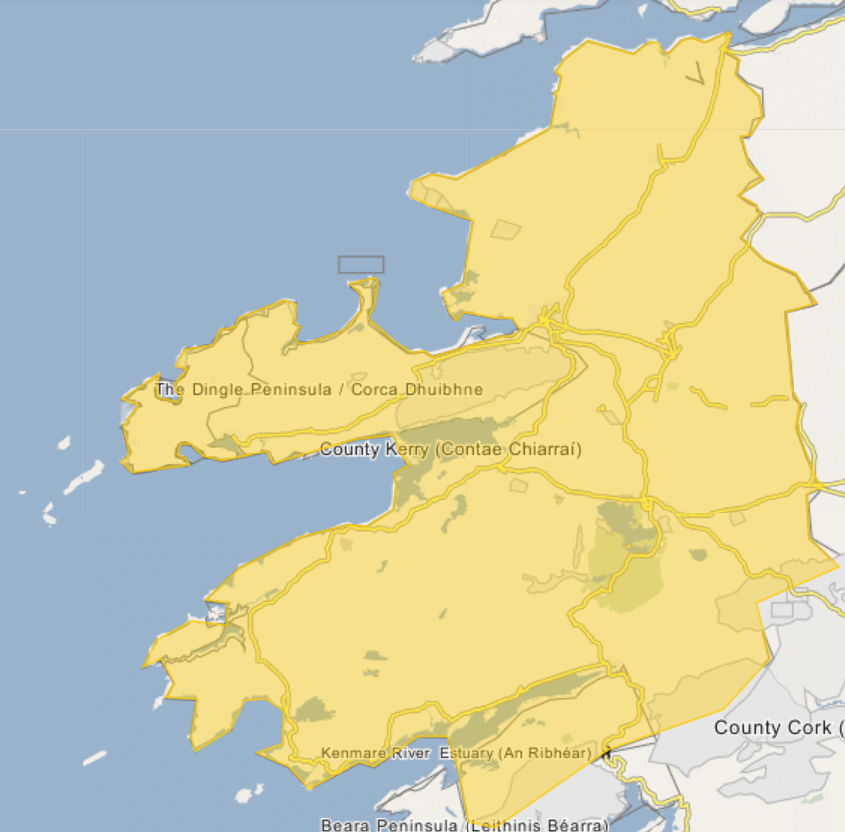
- Crotta shown within Ireland Crotta (Ireland)
- Country: Ireland
- County: County Kerry
- Barony: Clanmaurice
- Civil parish: Kilflynn

Area
  - Total: 190.13 ha (469.8 acres)

Crotta, (Irish: Crota) is a townland of County Kerry, Ireland. It was formerly known also as 'Crotto'.

It is one of the sixteen original townlands of the civil parish of Kilflynn and is also the most northerly. It is mostly rural land.

== Archaeology and history ==
The townland has three recognised sites, all ringforts, which are designated as National Monuments which can be found at the following grid references (using the Universal Transverse Mercator coordinate system (UTM)): 29U 489441 625 865, 29U 489309 625643, 29U 489713 625325.

Crotta was the seat of the Stack family, well-established in the area. Kilflynn had even been known as 'Stackstown'. Thomas Stack owned Crotta amongst other townlands. Because of their support for the Irish Rebellion of 1641 and the Catholic Confederation of Kilkenny the Stacks' land was confiscated following the Act for the Settlement of Ireland in 1652. After the Act of Settlement of 1662, the land passed to Henry Ponsonby in 1666. Ponsonby was a soldier and a brother of a colonel in Oliver Cromwell's New Model Army, one of 12,000 soldiers to receive a promised entitlement for his military endeavours.

In 1669, he built Crotta House and it remained in the family until sold by Thomas Carrique Ponsonby in 1842. In 1850, Crotta House was being leased by Lieutenant Colonel Henry Horatio Kitchener and Frances Anne Chevallier. They had one daughter and four sons. Their second son became Crotta's most famous former tenant: Horatio Herbert Kitchener, the first Earl Kitchener, Earl of Khartoum and of Broome, field marshal of the British Army and Minister for War for the United Kingdom. He was born in Ballylongford in 1850 but spent most of his youth at Crotta. His youngest brother Frederick Walter Kitchener (born 1858) became lieutenant-general, Knight Commander of Order of the Bath and governor and Commander-in-chief of Bermuda. His older brother, Henry Elliott Chevalier Kitchener (b.1846), succeeded him as earl, having had an army career (including a posting at the Curragh Camp, County Kildare) with a final rank of colonel.

By the second half of the 20th century, barely anything was visibly evident of the ruined main house. The gate lodge, however, still stands and is in private usage, listed as part of the National Inventory of Architectural Heritage (UTM 29U 489708 625772).

== Representation ==
Crotta is in the Roman Catholic parish of Abbeydorney, whose priest is the Very Reverend Denis O’Mahony.

The local parliamentary constituency (since 2020) is Kerry, returning five Teachtaí Dála (TDs) to the Dáil Éireann. The current TDs are Norma Foley (Fianna Fáil), Pa Daly (Sinn Féin), Brendan Griffin (Fine Gael), Danny Healy-Rae (Independent) and Michael Healy-Rae (Independent).

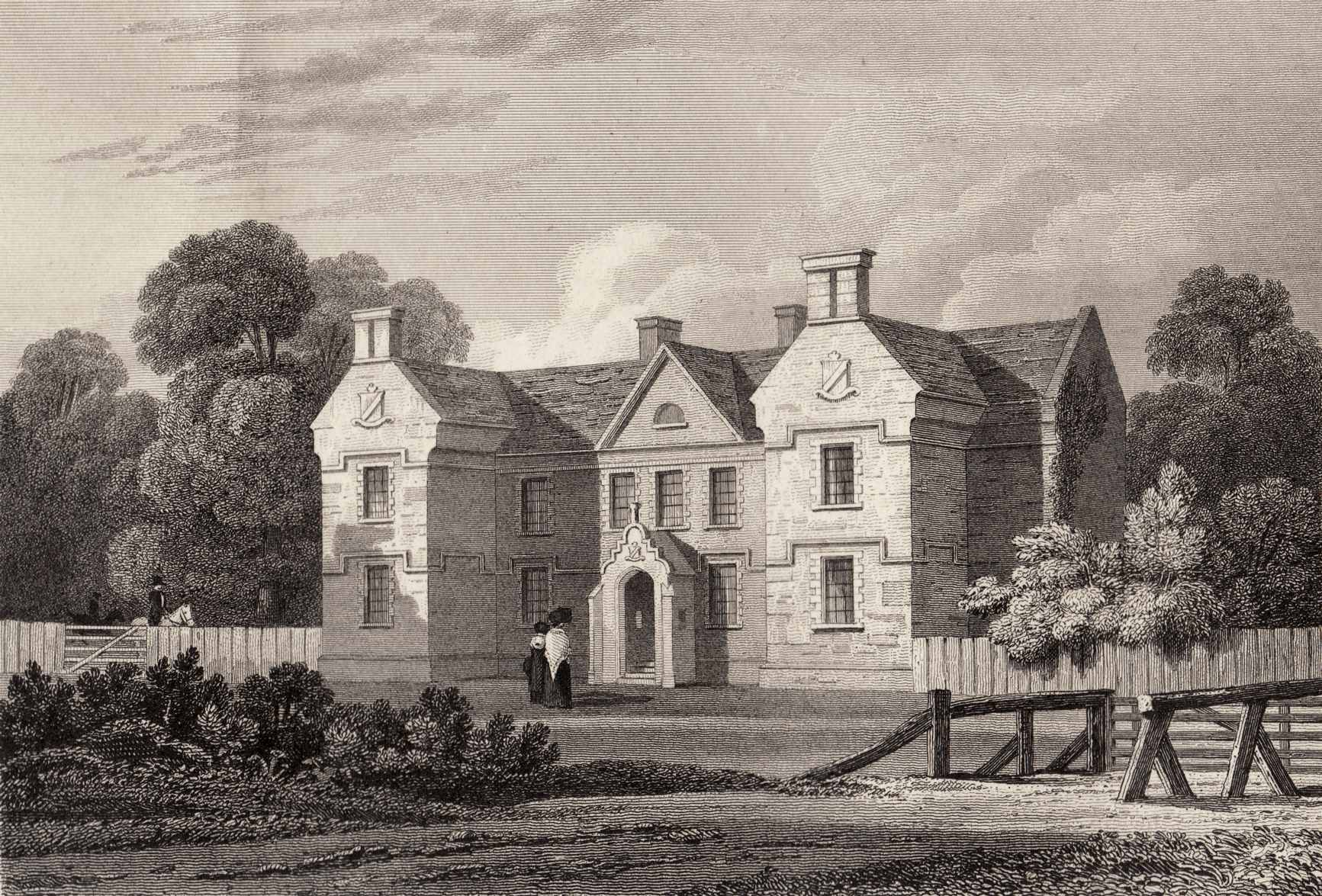
Crotta House, drawn by John Preston Neale, 1823

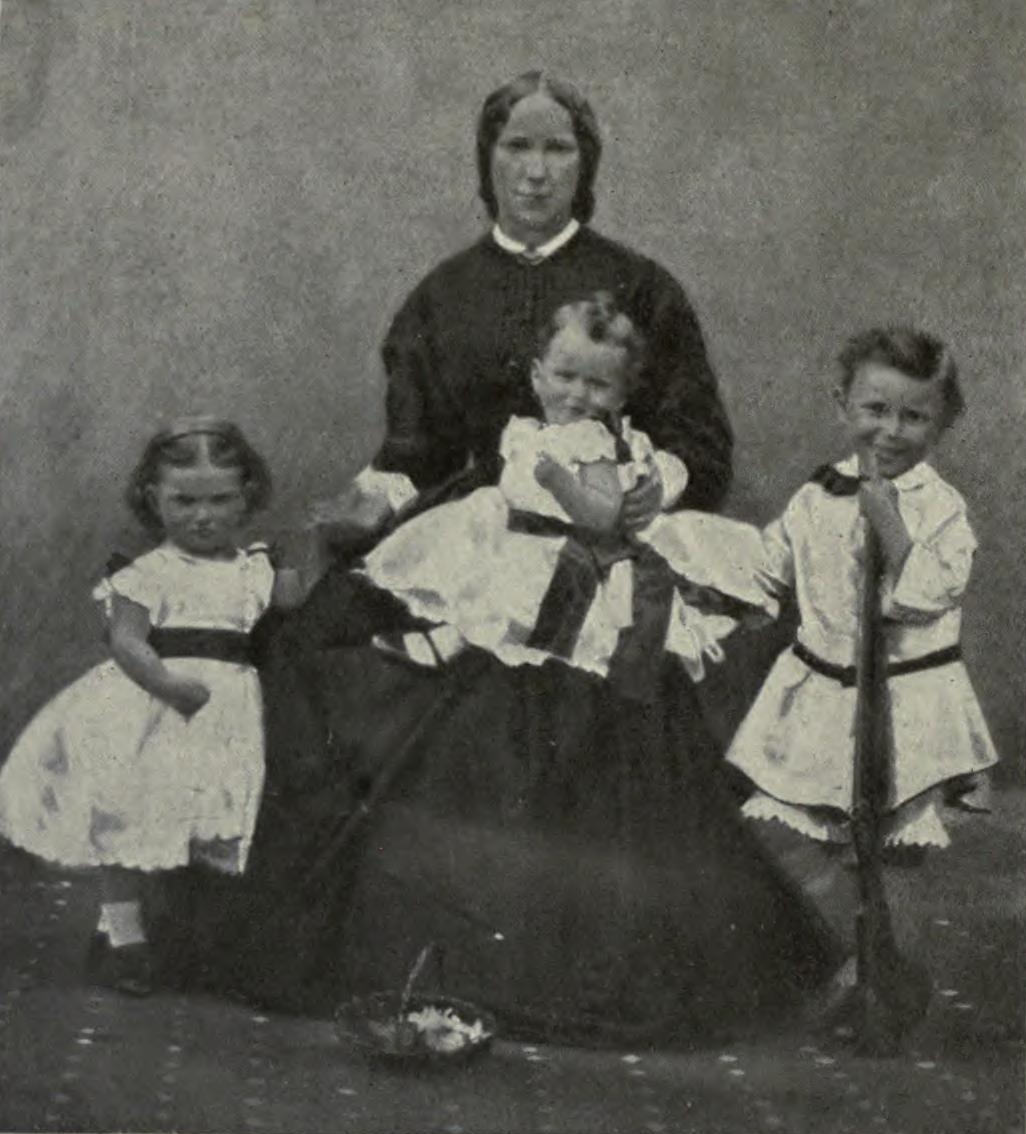
he young Horatio Herbert Kitchener on his mother's lap in 1851, with his older brother, Henry, and sister, Frances Emily Jane

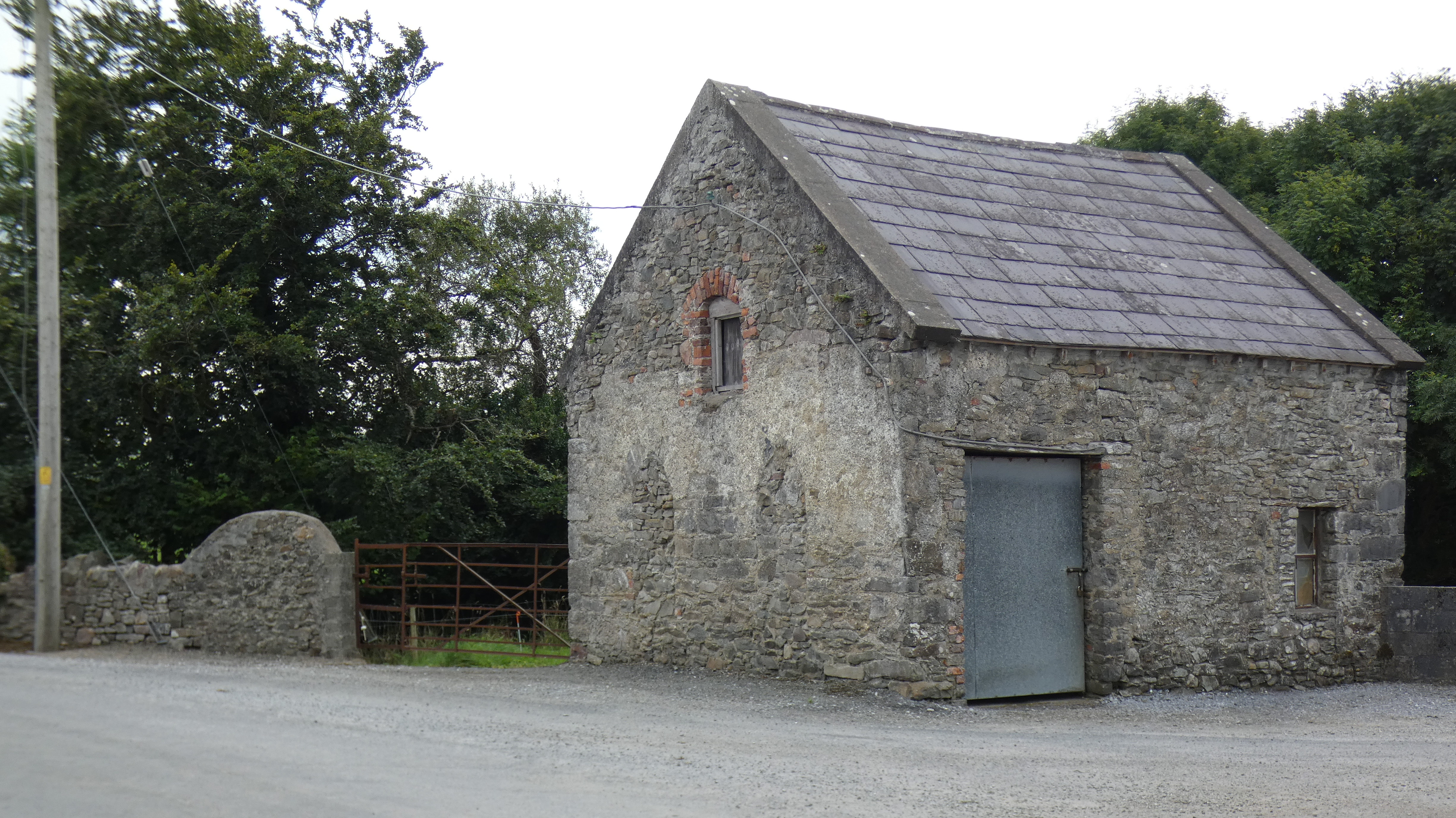
A gate lodge, built c. 1850, the last extant building of the old Crotta estate. The site of Crotta House was further south, now with farm buildings.

== See also ==
- Civil parishes in Ireland
- Kilflynn
