= Act of Settlement (disambiguation) =

Act of Settlement most commonly refers to the Act of Settlement 1701, an Act of the Parliament of England.

Act of Settlement or Settlement Act may also refer to:

- Act for the Settlement of Ireland 1652, in response to the Irish Rebellion of 1641
- Act of Settlement 1657, ratifying previous decrees from the Act for the Settlement of Ireland 1652
- Act of Settlement 1662, a partial reversal of the Act of Settlement of 1652
- Poor Relief Act 1662 ("the Settlement Act"), clarifying which parishes were responsible for Poor Relief
- Act of Settlement 1704, clarifying the status of the population of the Isle of Man

== See also ==
- Closer Settlement Acts, New Zealand
- Settlement (disambiguation)
