= Restoration (Ireland) =

1660 restoration of monarchy

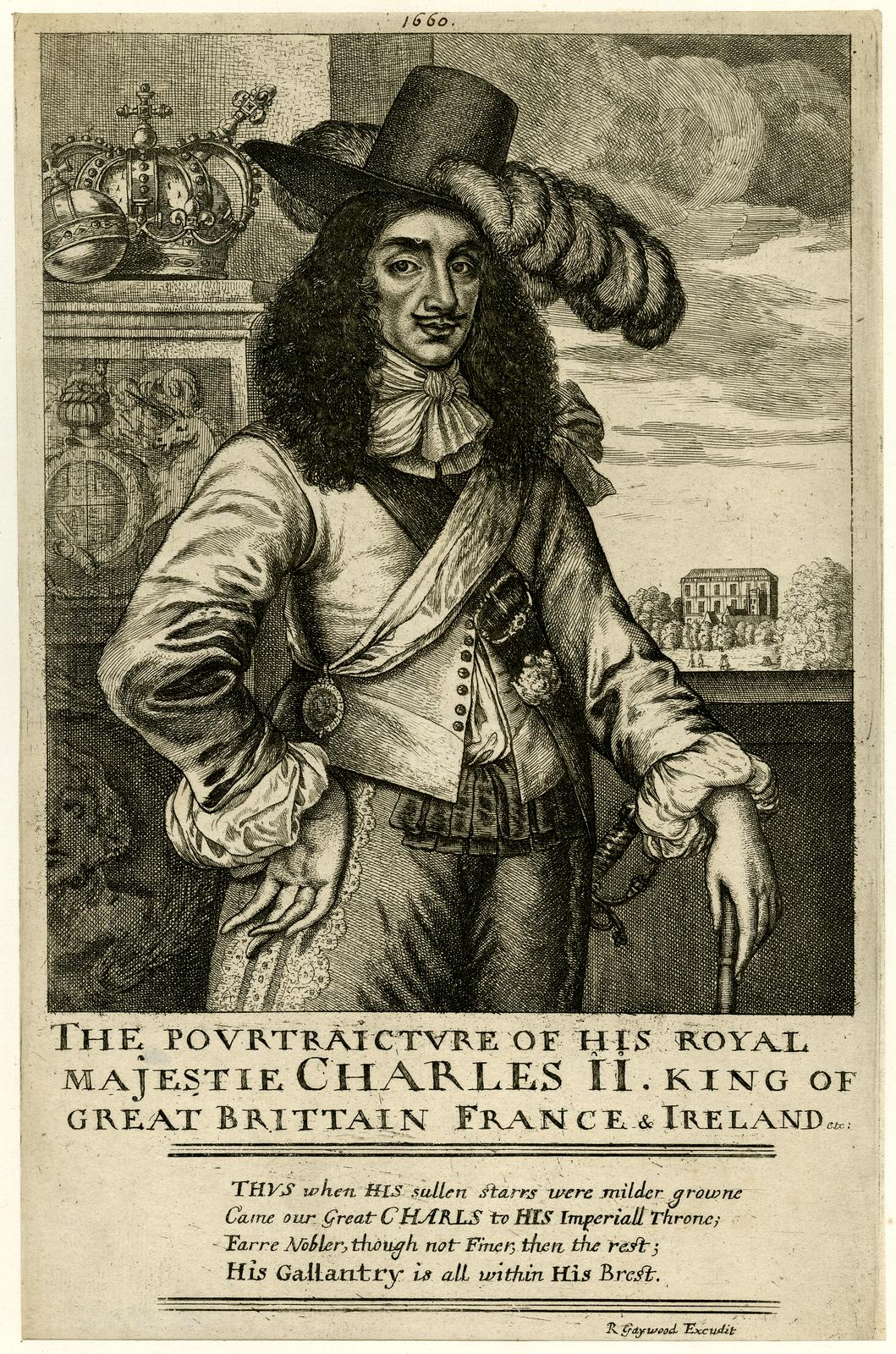
1660 print of Charles II

The armorial achievement of the Kingdom of Ireland, including the infrequently used crest used by James I

The Restoration (Irish: An Athghairm) of the Monarchy of Ireland began in 1660. The Commonwealth of England, Scotland and Ireland (1649–1660) resulted from the Wars of the Three Kingdoms but collapsed in 1659. Politicians such as General Monck tried to ensure a peaceful transition of the government from the "Commonwealth" republic back to monarchy. From 1 May 1660 the English, Scottish and Irish monarchies were all restored under King Charles II. The term Restoration may apply both to the actual event by which the monarchy was restored, and to the period immediately before and after the event.

== End of the republic ==
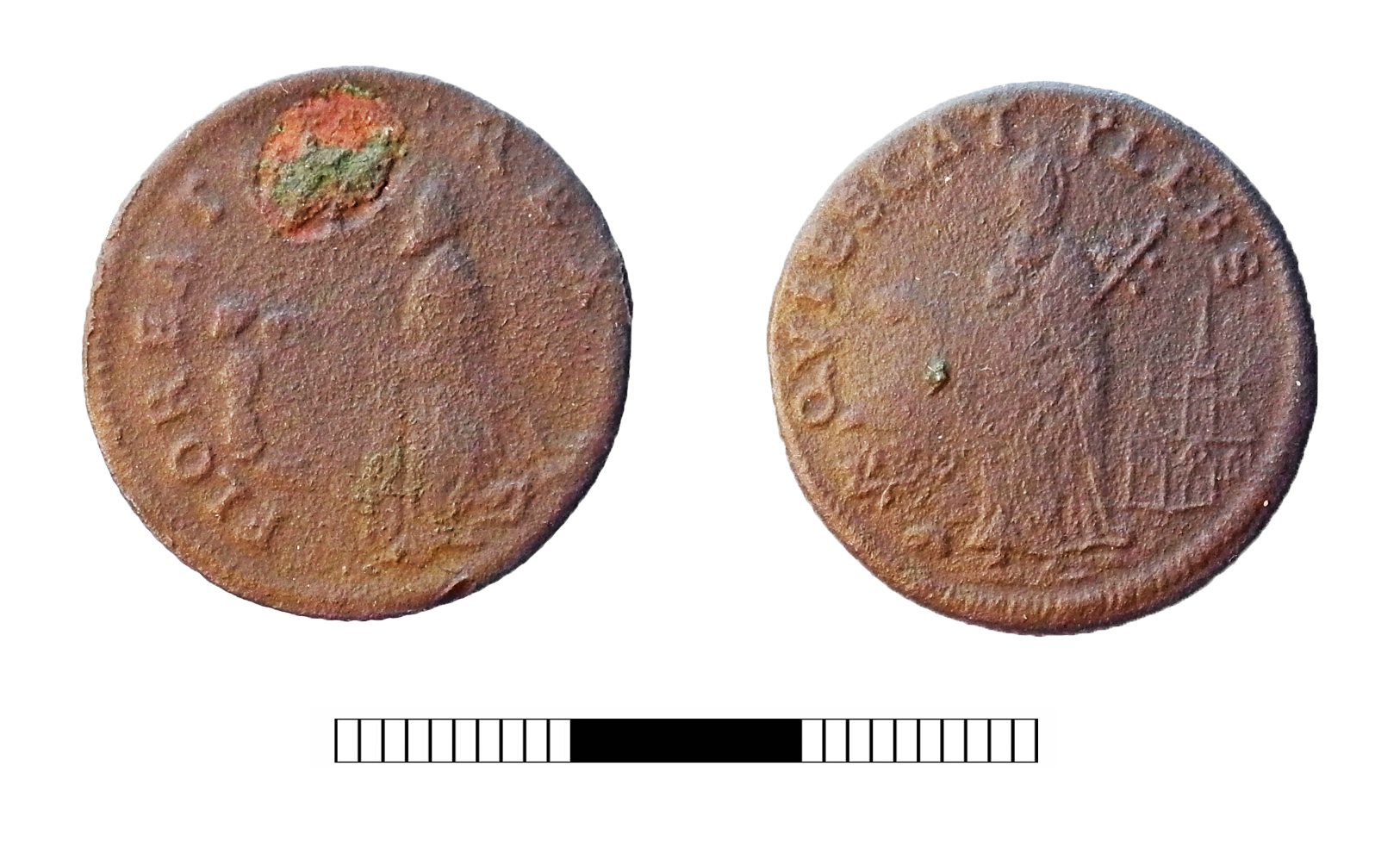
St Patrick halfpenny issued 1658–70 with legends meaning "May the king flourish" and "May the people be at peace."

With the collapse of The Protectorate in England during May 1659 the republic which had been forced upon Ireland by Oliver Cromwell quickly began to unravel.

Royalists planned an uprising in Ireland and sought to turn Henry Cromwell and Lord Broghill (who was in contact with the King's court in the summer of 1659) towards the cause but the plan came to naught. Henry Cromwell left Ireland in June 1659. Broghill showed reluctance to declare for the King, but nevertheless republicans were suspicious of him following Booth's revolt in England in 1659.

Sir Theophilus Jones, a former soldier under Charles I of Ireland and governor of Dublin during the republic, seized Dublin Castle with a group of officers and declared for Parliament. Acting in Charles II's interest, Sir Charles Coote seized Galway while Lord Broghill held firm in Munster. On 9 January 1660 a council of officers declared Edmund Ludlow a traitor, and he fled to England. The regicide Hardress Waller re-took Dublin Castle in February 1660 but with little support he surrendered to Sir Charles Coote. Waller along with fellow regicide John Cook was arrested and sent to England. The officers in Dublin supported General Monck.

The army was purged of radicals and a Convention Parliament called. Coote sought to move the Convention Parliament towards restoration, but his rival Broghill did not openly declare for the King until May 1660.

In February 1660 Coote sent a representative to King Charles II in the Netherlands and invited him to make an attempt on Ireland, but the King regarded it as inexpedient to try and reclaim Ireland before England. At the same time Broghill sent his brother to invite the King to land at Cork. In March 1660 a document was published asking for the King's return, "begged for his forgiveness, but stipulated for a general indemnity and the payment of army arrears".

Following events in England Charles was proclaimed King of Ireland in Dublin on 14 May without any dissent. The Royal Irish Army was reestablished.

== Return of Charles II ==
Stuart Coat of Arms

"The commonwealth parliamentary union was, after 1660, treated as null and void". As in England the republic was deemed constitutionally never to have occurred. The Convention Parliament was dissolved by Charles II in January 1661, and he summoned his first parliament in Ireland in May 1661.

In 1662, 29 May was made a public holiday.

Coote, Broghill and Sir Maurice Eustace were initially the main political figures in the Restoration. George Monck, Duke of Albemarle was given the position of Lord Lieutenant of Ireland but he did not assume office. In 1662 the 1st Duke of Ormonde returned as the Lord Lieutenant of Ireland and became the predominant political figure of the Restoration period.

== Religious Settlement ==
Irish people were encouraged by the Declaration of Breda (1660), by which Charles declared for religious toleration: ".. that no man shall be disquieted or called in question for differences of opinion in matter of religion which do not disturb the peace of the kingdom." The declaration was then markedly reduced by the Clarendon Code acts of 1661–1665.

The Church of Ireland was restored as the national Church. "On 22 January 1661 the King issued a proclamation declaring all meetings by papists, Presbyterians, Independents and separatists illegal". Parliament later passed the Act of Uniformity 1666 similar to an Act in England of the same name. Whilst the religious settlement was satisfactory neither to Catholic nor Presbyterian, there was some degree of toleration, penal laws were laxly enforced and there was no equivalent of the Conventicle Act 1664.

Catholics and Dissenters were allowed to take their seats again in the Parliament of Ireland session of 1666.

== Land settlements ==
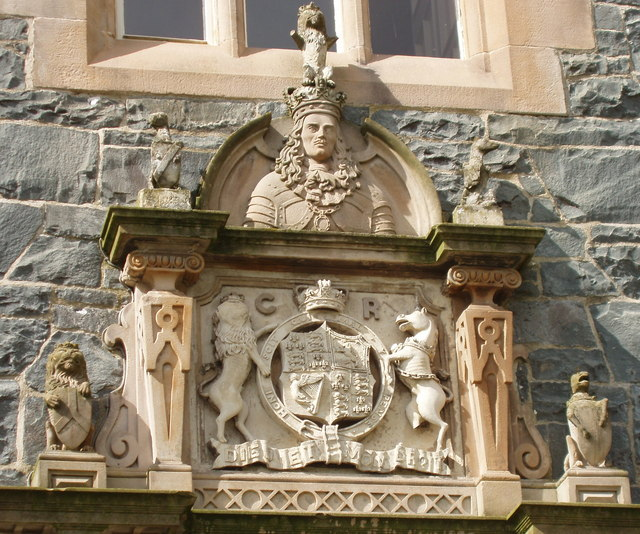
Portrait and arms of Charles I displayed at Killyleagh Castle, County Down, seat of the Hamilton Earls of Clanbrassil.

The most controversial aspect after the Restoration was the expected revision of the 1652 Cromwellian land settlement. Prior to the Republic, 60% of Irish land was owned by the Catholic landed gentry, but much had been forfeited de jure under the Adventurers' Act 1640 and de facto after the Cromwellian conquest of Ireland in 1649–53.

Irish Protestants who had helped guarantee the Restoration in 1660, expected to retain the lands they had paid the State for in the 1650s without further interference, relying on privity of contract. Against this, many Irish Catholic Royalists not only had supported Charles I but also supported Charles II during his exile and now expected their lands back. Other dispossessed Catholic landlords had been given lands in Connacht that were confiscated from landlords there, who naturally wanted all of their land back.

A Declaration was made on the land issue in 1660, followed by the Act of Settlement 1662. As this did not settle the matter there followed the Act of Explanation 1665. The result was a compromise; Charles needed the continuing support of the former republicans and Catholics ended up with about 20% of the land. Charles II also gave some of the Irish land taken from the regicides to his (Catholic) brother the Duke of York. Likewise he gave Irish land to his Catholic mistress Barbara, née Villiers, and an Irish title Earl of Castlemaine to her Catholic husband Roger Palmer.

The issue of the religion of landowners was complicated by examples like the Earl of Inchiquin, who had been a Protestant parliamentarian during the war and converted to Catholicism in 1656; or the Marquess of Clanricarde, a Catholic who lost his lands in the 1650s, that were restored to his Protestant heir in 1662. The past focus on religion has changed to a realisation that the main beneficiaries were the grander English and Irish nobility, regardless of their religion, and the losers were the smaller landed gentry. The Catholic Earl of Clancarty increased his lands from 82,000 acres (330 km^{2}) in 1641 to 161,000 acres (650 km^{2}) by 1670.

In Ulster however, "Cromwell's settlement was not overturned". Landless Catholics who struggled against the Protestants who had bought their confiscated lands were known as tóraidhe or tories. They were "perceived as dispossessed Catholics waging a war of revenge against the new social order created by the land confiscations of the 1640s and 1650s". Some Ulster royalists were compensated with land elsewhere; the hopelessly over-mortgaged viscount Magennis lost his land in County Down but was instead given 4,000 acres (16 km^{2}) in counties Roscommon and Limerick by Charles II in the 1670s. There were exceptions to the rule, as Randal MacDonnell, 1st Marquess of Antrim had also received land in Connaught in 1652, but had all his County Antrim estates restored in 1665. Sir Henry O'Neill "of the Fews" and his brother Shane also had their lands confiscated and were given estates in County Mayo.

== See also ==
- Kingdom of Ireland
