= Thomas FitzGerald of Turlough =

Irish landowner

Thomas FitzGerald of Turlough (1661–1747) was an Irish landowner.

== Family background ==
FitzGerald was the son of John FitzGerald (died 1720), who had been transplanted from Gorteens Castle, County Kilkenny, to County Mayo in 1653. He was allocated half the estates of Walter Bourke in the parish of Turlough, five miles north of Castlebar. These lands were confirmed to John FitzGerald in 1677 under the Act for the Settlement of Ireland 1652 and 1665. John built the family's first home at Rockfield, Turlough. He married Elizabeth Browne in 1669, she being the youngest daughter of Sir John Browne of the Neale. Their children were Thomas, Edmond, and Patrick.

== Life ==
Thomas succeeded to the Turlough estate upon John's death in 1720. To this point the family were still Catholic, but Thomas conformed in 1717 to the Church of Ireland because, due to the Penal Laws, a Catholic could not inherit an estate entire. In 1722, Thomas built Turlough House, a semi-fortified, defended house, which was the main residence of the family until the death of his grandson, George Robert FitzGerald, in 1786.

== Marriages and descendants ==
He first married Elizabeth Feffon, mother of Ralph Ferron, Master of Buckhounds to George II. He does not seem to have any issue by her. FitzGerald's second marriage was to his cousin Henrietta Browne of the Neale (died 8 December 1774), daughter of John Browne. By her he had eleven children. Their eldest son was George, who succeeded to the estate.

From his daughter Mary Anne who married Marquess Orazio Arezzo he is grandfather of Cardinal Tommaso Arezzo.

A granddaughter, Henrietta Fitzgerald, married Henry Grattan in 1782, by whom she had two sons and two daughters. Her father was Nicholas, third son of Thomas.

== Estate ==
The estate was sold in 1991 to Mayo County Council and is now home to the Irish Museum of Country Life.
