= Timothy Brecknock =

- Born: c. 1719; Northamptonshire, England
- Died: 12 June 1786; Castlebar, County Mayo, Ireland
- Cause of death: Hanging
- Burial place: Turlough, County Mayo, Ireland
- Education: Pembroke College, Oxford; Lincoln's Inn
- Occupations: Lawyer, Writer
- Known for: Author of Droit le Roy; execution for conspiracy to murder

Timothy Brecknock (c. 1719–1786) was an eccentric lawyer and writer. After studying at Oxford and Lincoln’s Inn, he embarked on a career in London that was mired in controversy. In later life, along with his employer, George Robert FitzGerald, he was executed for conspiracy to murder, in Castlebar, County Mayo in 1786, although he vigorously denied the charge.

== Background ==
Brecknock was born the eldest son of Timothy Brecknock of Northam Parish of Eye, Northamptonshire, England, c. 1719. He matriculated at Pembroke College, Oxford aged seventeen on 10 June 1736. Having left Oxford without a degree, he gained admittance to Lincoln's Inn on 19 May 1738.

== Eccentric Behaviour ==
His subsequent career in London gained a certain notoriety: “In this way lived Brecknock — his business was that of a knave — his pleasures those of a green-room frequenter and friend of demireps — he was, in practice, the Tom Jones of sundry Lady Bellastons.” Although not called to the bar in London, his reputation followed him into the courtroom when he saved a highwayman from the gallows in 1758. To this end, he had presented a fraudulent reprint of lunation times in Ryder’s Almanack that fooled the court by invalidating the identification of the robber by moonlight.

== Book Burned in London ==
Having published books of poetry and satire, his political pamphlet, Droit le Roy (a Digest of the Rights and Prerogatives of the Imperial Crown of Great Britain), brought him to national attention. His work was described in the House of Lords as a “pestilent treatise” that was “Jacobitical” in nature. Despite mild dissent from the Jacobite peer Hugh Hume-Campbell, 3rd Earl of Marchmont, Droit le Roy was ordered to be burned outside the gates of Westminster in 1764. Brecknock later found common cause with Hugh Percy, 1st Duke of Northumberland but their advances to George III were rebuffed. He was later recorded as a prisoner in His Majesty’s Fleet Prison in 1765, although his detention may have been occasioned by bankruptcy rather than by rebellion. Thereafter, Brecknock dabbled in alchemy and religion. He was described as a colourful radical and alchemist “reputed to drink a bowl of his own blood every Good Friday.”

== Executed in Ireland ==
With advancing years, he was saved from penury by the equally eccentric landowner and duellist George Robert Fitzgerald of Turlough, County Mayo, Ireland who appointed him as his law agent. Presumably fearing for his future, Brecknock reputedly abducted the heiress, Anne O’Donel of Moyvale, County Mayo in 1785 with a view to marriage. However, no primary source has been found to confirm that event.

In the following year, he was charged with complicity in the murder of Patrick Randal McDonnell, Colonel of the Mayo Volunteers. He was found guilty despite mounting a vigorous defence to that indictment, summarized in a letter to his sister in London. Like FitzGerald, he maintained that he had never intended to kill McDonnell, despite a longstanding feud between McDonnell and FitzGerald, and in fact, the actual killer was his fellow employee, Andrew Craig, who turned informer against the other two. On 12 June 1786, Brecknock was hanged along with Fitzgerald in Castlebar, County Mayo. He was aged about sixty-seven. He is buried at Turlough.
