= Gorteens Castle =

Ruined castle in County Kilkenny, Ireland

Coordinates: 52°16′13″N 7°02′41″W

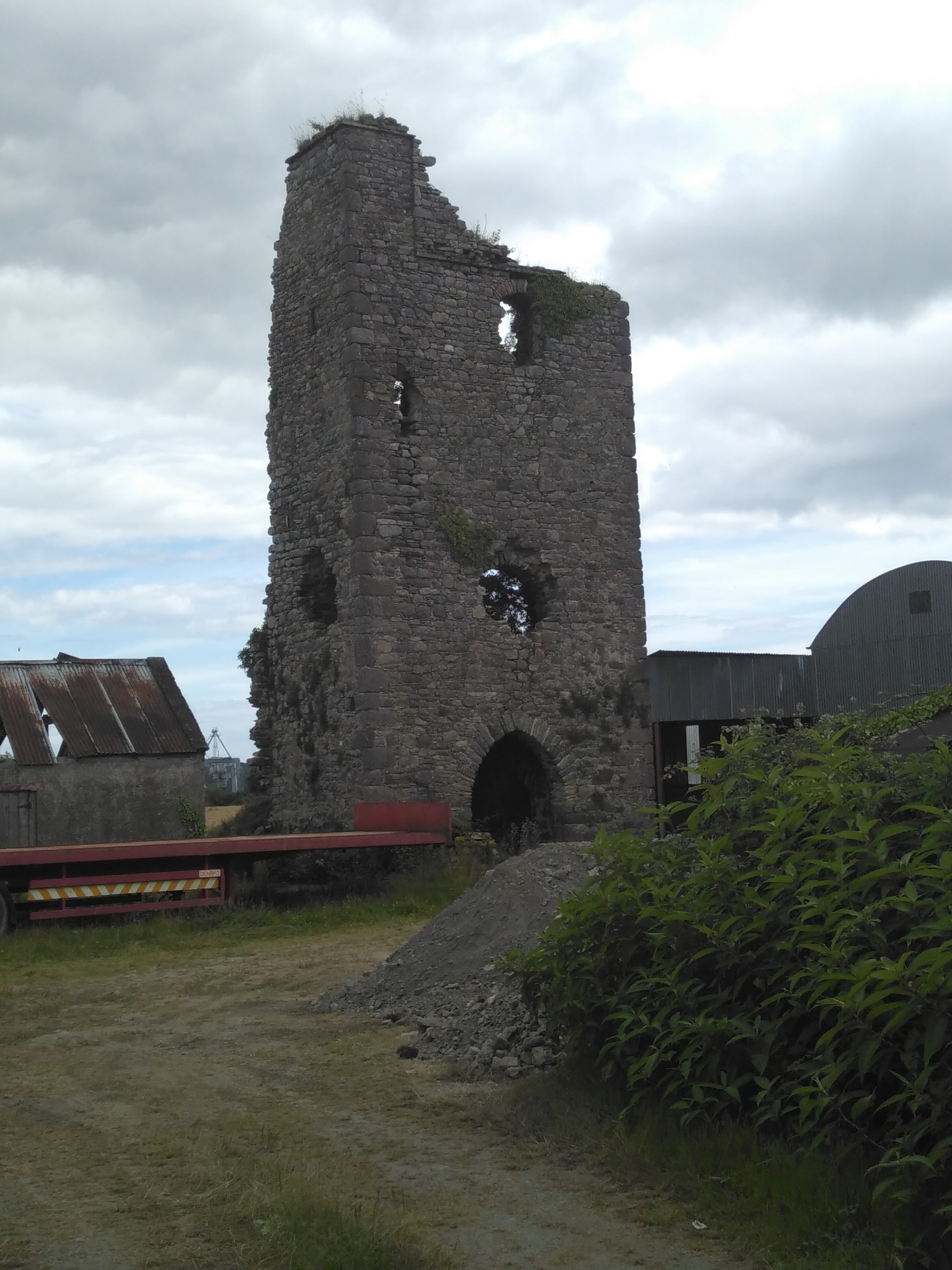
View of the remaining gatehouse of Gorteens Castle and surrounding farm yard

Gorteens Castle is a ruined castle situated on private land in south-east County Kilkenny near the village of Slieverue close to Waterford city. It is in the historic parish of Rathpatrick in the south-east of the Barony of Ida. Along with the ruins of Rathpatrick church and another church, it is one of several ruins in Rathpatrick Parish.

The ruin consists of a gatehouse that may have belonged to a larger structure. Gorteens comes from the Irish goirtín or na goirtínidhe which means "little field" or "little garden". Archaeological excavations near the castle in 1993 indicated that the site was used between the 16th and 18th centuries, with further excavations in 2003 identifying additional castle walls and outbuildings.

== Owners ==
The castle was originally built upon lands acquired by Raymond FitzGerald, who died in the late 1100s. The FitzGeralds were the most powerful Norman-Irish aristocratic dynasty in medieval Ireland until the 1500s. Gorteens was included in the Down Survey of Ireland in 1656 as being in the Baronys of Ida, Igrim or Ibercon and in the Parish of Rathpatricke. John FitzGerald, a Catholic, is recorded as being the last FitzGerald holder of Gorteens.

Following the Cromwellian conquest of Ireland, FitzGerald forfeited Gorteens under the Cromwellian Settlement and was initially transplanted to Connaught in December 1653, before being assigned lands in Turlough and later in Carra, County Mayo by 1677. The duellist George Robert FitzGerald was descended from this family.

By 1670, the castle at Gorteens was reputedly in the hands of Samuel Skrimsheire or Skrimshaw, a Protestant. In 1700, it was owned by members of the Forstall family.
