= Unsettled (disambiguation) =

Unsettled is a 2007 documentary about Israelis in the Gaza strip. Unsettled may also refer to:

- Unsettled (TV series), a 2021 Canadian drama
- "Unsettled", a song from the 1988 Robyn Hitchcock album Globe of Frogs
- Unsettled, a 2004 poetry collection by Zachariah Wells
- Unsettled, a 2021 book by Steven E. Koonin
- Uninhabited regions

== See also ==
- Unsettled Land, a 1987 Israeli drama directed by Uri Barbas
- Settlement (disambiguation)
