= Mark Newby =

Mark Newby (also known as Mark Newbie) was born in England and emigrated to Ireland due to religious persecution for his being a Quaker. Along with several other families he sailed to America landing in West New Jersey and settled in Camden, New Jersey.

He owned a tract of land and built a home establishing himself as a banker. He and/or some of the other settlers brought the St. Patrick halfpenny in sufficient quantity that he along with others received a grant to make these coins legal tender in the region on 18 May 1682.

== Death ==
He died in 1683 in Camden, New Jersey.
