= National Museum of Ireland, Turlough Park =

Social history museum in County Mayo, Ireland

National Museum of Ireland – Country Life
- Ard-Mhúsaem na hÉireann – Saol na Tuaithe
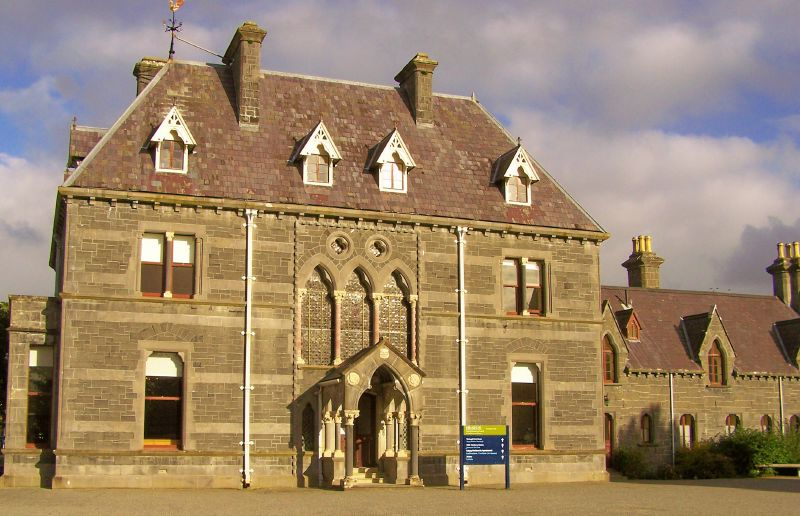
- Turlough Park House, adjacent to the Museum

- Location within Ireland
- Established: September 2001
- Location: Turlough Park, Castlebar, County Mayo, Ireland
- Coordinates: 53.883584°N 9.207623°W
- Type: National museum
- Visitors: 100,000
- Architects: Thomas Newenham Deane, Dublin
- Public transit access: Castlebar railway station Bus Éireann routes: 52, 60, 440, 456
- Website: Museum of Country Life website

National Museum of Ireland network
- Archaeology; Decorative Arts & History; Country Life; Natural History

The National Museum of Ireland – Country Life, officially National Museum of Ireland, Turlough Park from 2026, is a branch of the National Museum of Ireland. Located near Turlough village, 8 km (5.0 mi) northeast of Castlebar, County Mayo, Ireland, and established in 2001, the museum is Ireland's only national museum outside Dublin. The museum exhibits the way of life of rural Irish people between 1850 and 1950, and is in the grounds of Turlough Park House. There are displays about the home, the natural environment, trades and crafts, communities, and working on the land and on water.

== History ==
=== Turlough House ===
The current Turlough House was designed by Thomas Newenham Deane, who also designed the Kildare Street branch of the National Museum of Ireland. It was built from 1863 to 1867, and was owned by the Fitzgerald family of Turlough.

=== Museum ===
In 1991, the house and 36 acres were purchased by the Mayo County Council. The house was renovated and an adjacent museum building was constructed in the slope of a hill above a pond. The Country Life Museum opened in September 2001. The upstairs of the original house is used as offices by the museum's small staff, and the downstairs is on show to the public.

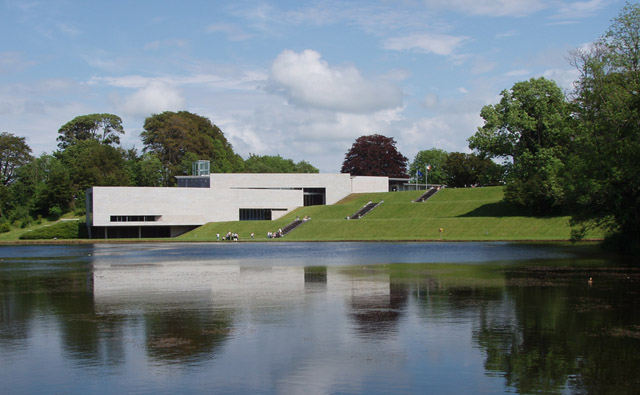
Landscape surrounding the Museum of Country Life.

=== Gardens ===
The original gardens of Turlough House are now maintained by the Office of Public Works and the local authority, Mayo County Council. They include a vinery, a special type of greenhouse for grapevines and other fruiting plants, a number of walks, terraces and a sunken garden, the ruins of the original house (occupied 1722–1786) and a section of the Castlebar River, with an artificial lake with islands, and a round tower.

== Collection ==
The National Folklife collection is extensive, comprising around 37,000 items, and only a small part of it is on display at Turlough Park, much of it being in storage there, and the remainder, including large machinery, in the National Museum's storage facility at the former St Conleth's Reformatory School in Daingean, County Offaly, or at the Collections Resource Centre on the edge of Swords, County Dublin. There is also a library and archive facility, and access to this, and the unshown items, is available by application.

=== Exhibitions ===
The museum has both permanent and temporary exhibitions, arranged on a thematic basis over four floors.

Some features have included:

- Michael Davitt Exhibition, an exhibition to commemorate the life of Michael Davitt, the founder of the Irish National Land League.
- The Cross of Cong, a 12th-century processional cross that purportedly contains a piece of the True Cross, and is considered one of Ireland's most important medieval art treasures. The cross was kept at Cong Abbey in County Mayo until 1839 when it was given to the Royal Irish Academy and then the National Museum of Ireland, Dublin. In 2010, the cross was returned to County Mayo to be displayed at the Museum of Country Life for one year.
- Power and Privilege: Photographs of the Big House in Ireland 1858–1922, an exhibit showing the lives of the gentry and their servants.
- The Coggalbeg hoard, a bronze-age gold collar and discs that were dug up in a bog near Strokestown in 1945. The hoard had been stored in a Pharmacy safe until the safe was stolen in 2009. The contents of the safe, including the gold objects which were presumably overlooked, were found in a dumpster.

== Facilities ==
The museum has its own parking, a shop and a café. The museum opens Sunday and Monday, 1pm–5pm and Tuesday to Saturday, 10am–5pm.

== Operations ==
The National Museum of Ireland as a whole, which includes the Museum of Country Life, underwent a decrease in funding from €19m in 2008 to less than €12m in 2014. Although there were tentative plans to close some of the museum branches or initiate an entrance fee, as of 2018, these plans have not gone into effect.
