= Adventurers' Act 1640 =

Act of the Parliament of England

- Act of Parliament
- Parliament of England
- Long title: An Act for the speedy and effectuall reducing of the Rebells in his Majesties Kingdome of Ireland to theire due obedience to his Majesty & the Crowne of England.
- Citation: 16 Cha. 1. c. 33
- Territorial extent: England and Wales; Ireland

Dates
- Royal assent: 19 March 1642
- Commencement: 3 November 1640 (Note: Start of session.)
- Repealed: Northern Ireland: 23 May 1950; Republic of Ireland: 8 May 2007
Other legislation
Repealed by	Northern Ireland: Statute Law Revision Act 1950; Republic of Ireland: Republic of Ireland: Statute Law Revision Act 2007
Relates to	Lands of Irish Rebels (Adventurers' Subscriptions) Act 1640; Lands of Irish Rebels (Adventurers' Subscriptions) (No. 2) Act 1640; Irish Rebels Act 1640; Act for the Settlement of Ireland 1652

Status: Repealed

Text of statute as originally enacted

The Adventurers' Act 1640 (16 Cha. 1. c. 33) was an act of the Parliament of England which specified its aim as "the speedy and effectual reducing of the rebels in His Majesty's Kingdom of Ireland".

The Irish Rebellion of 1641 had broken out five months earlier, and the act was designed to pay the army needed to subdue the rebellion by using borrowed money. Repayment would come from confiscating the rebels' lands and selling them.

== The main act ==
It was passed by the Long Parliament on 19 March 1642 as a way of raising funds to suppress the Irish Rebellion of 1641. The act invited members of the public to invest £200 for which they would receive 1,000 acres (400 ha; 4.0 km^{2}) of lands that would be confiscated from rebels in Ireland. 2.5 million acres (1.0 million hectares; 10,000 square kilometres) of Irish land were set aside by the English government for this purpose. The entire island of Ireland is about 20.9 million acres (8.5 million hectares; 85,000 square kilometres).

The enactment was done at the request of King Charles in the House of Lords, joined by the Commons, and was unanimously accepted, without any debate. The Bill had been placed before the Houses for inspection but was not formally read into the record. The title of the Act – "An Act for the speedy and effectual reducing of the Rebels, in His Majesty's Kingdom of Ireland, to their due Obedience to His Majesty, and the Crown of England" – was read out to Parliament, followed by the statement: "le roy le veult".

The "Adventurers" were so called because they were risking their money at a time when the Crown had just had to pay for the Bishops' Wars in 1639–40. "Reducing" the rebels meant leading them back (Latin: reducere) to the legal concept of the "King's Peace". King Charles could not subsequently enforce the act, but it was realised by his political opponents following the Cromwellian conquest of Ireland in 1649–1653, and formed the main legal basis for the contentious Act for the Settlement of Ireland 1652.

Ironically, in May 1642 the Confederate Irish rebels drafted the Confederate Oath of Association that recognised Charles as their monarch.

== Auxiliary acts ==
Lands of Irish Rebels (Adventurers' Subscriptions) Act 1640
- Act of Parliament
- Parliament of England
- Long title: An Act for the explanation of a former act for reducing the rebels in Ireland.
- Citation: 16 Cha. 1. c. 34
- Territorial extent: England and Wales; Ireland

Dates
- Royal assent: 6 April 1642
- Commencement: 3 November 1640 (Note: Start of session.)
- Repealed: Northern Ireland: 23 May 1950
Other legislation
Repealed by	Northern Ireland: Statute Law Revision Act 1950
Relates to	Adventurers' Act 1640; Lands of Irish Rebels (Adventurers' Subscriptions) (No. 2) Act 1640; Irish Rebels Act 1640; Act for the Settlement of Ireland 1652

Status: Repealed

Text of statute as originally enacted

Lands of Irish Rebels (Adventurers' Subscriptions) (No. 2) Act 1640
- Act of Parliament
- Parliament of England
- Long title: An Act to enable corporations to adventure to Ireland.
- Citation: 16 Cha. 1. c. 35
- Territorial extent: England and Wales; Ireland

Dates
- Royal assent: 22 April 1642
- Commencement: 3 November 1640 (Note: Start of session.)
- Repealed: Northern Ireland: 23 May 1950
Other legislation
Repealed by	Northern Ireland: Statute Law Revision Act 1950
Relates to	Adventurers' Act 1640; Lands of Irish Rebels (Adventurers' Subscriptions) Act 1640; Irish Rebels Act 1640; Act for the Settlement of Ireland 1652

Status: Repealed

Text of statute as originally enacted

Irish Rebels Act 1640
- Act of Parliament
- Parliament of England
- Long title: An Act for the further reducing of the rebels in Ireland to their obedience to the King and crown of England.
- Citation: 16 Cha. 1. c. 37
- Territorial extent: England and Wales; Ireland

Dates
- Royal assent: 22 June 1642
- Commencement: 3 November 1640 (Note: Start of session.)
- Repealed: Northern Ireland: 23 May 1950
Other legislation
Repealed by	Northern Ireland: Statute Law Revision Act 1950
Relates to	Adventurers' Act 1640; Lands of Irish Rebels (Adventurers' Subscriptions) Act 1640; Lands of Irish Rebels (Adventurers' Subscriptions) (No. 2) Act 1640; Act for the Settlement of Ireland 1652

Status: Repealed

Text of statute as originally enacted

The Adventurers' Act was extended and amended by three other acts the Lands of Irish Rebels (Adventurers' Subscriptions) Act 1640 (c. 34), Lands of Irish Rebels (Adventurers' Subscriptions) (No. 2) Act 1640 (c. 35), and Irish Rebels Act 1640 (c. 37). All four received royal assent in the summer of 1642, just before the start of the English Civil War, but are usually referred to as 1640 acts—the year the Long Parliament started to sit—and as that year was the 16th year of Charles I's reign are formally known as 16 Cha. 1. c. 33 etc.

In July 1643, Parliament passed the Doubling Ordinance which doubled the allocation of land to anyone who increased their original investment by 25%. The purpose of the Act was twofold, firstly to raise money for Parliament to help suppress the rebellion in Ireland, and secondly to deprive the King of the lands seized from rebels that would be his by prerogative.

== Enforcement ==
To enforce the acts the Cromwellian conquest of Ireland was launched in 1649. In 1653, Ireland was declared subdued and the lands were allocated to the subscribers in what became known as the Cromwellian Settlement.

== Subsequent developments ==
All four acts were repealed for Northern Ireland by section 1(1) of, and the first schedule to, the Statute Law Revision Act 1950 (14 Geo. 6. c. 6), which came into force on 23 May 1950.

All four acts were repealed for the Republic of Ireland by sections 2(1) and 3(1) of, and part 2 of schedule 2 to, the Statute Law Revision Act 2007, which came into force on 8 May 2007.

== See also ==
- Act for the Settlement of Ireland 1652
- Act of Settlement 1657
- Act of Settlement 1662
- Confederate Ireland
