= Turlough Abbey =

National monument in Ireland

- Mainistir Thurlaigh
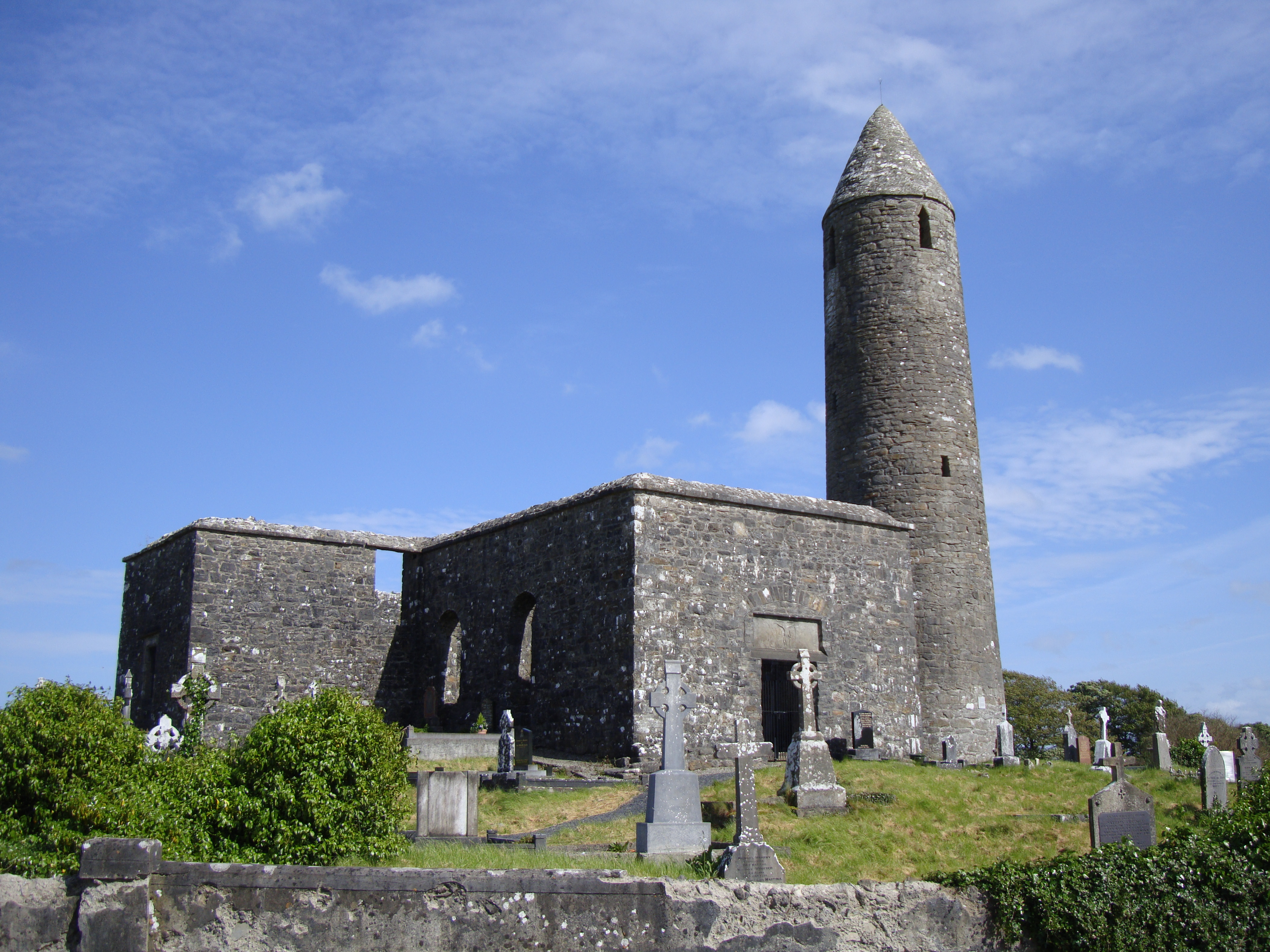

- Location within Ireland
- Interactive map of Turlough Abbey

Monastery information
- Established: c. AD 500–520
- Disestablished: 1635
- Diocese: Tuam

People
- Founder: Saint Patrick

Architecture
- Status: ruined
Heritage designation
Designations
National monument of Ireland
- Official name: Turlough Church & Round Tower
- Reference no.: 100

Site
- Location: Turlough, County Mayo
- Coordinates: 53.888741°N 9.208270°W
- Visible remains: church and round tower
- Public access: yes

Turlough Abbey is a former monastery and National Monument located in County Mayo, Ireland.

== Location ==
Turlough Abbey is located about 600 m (650 yd) northeast of Turlough village.

== History ==
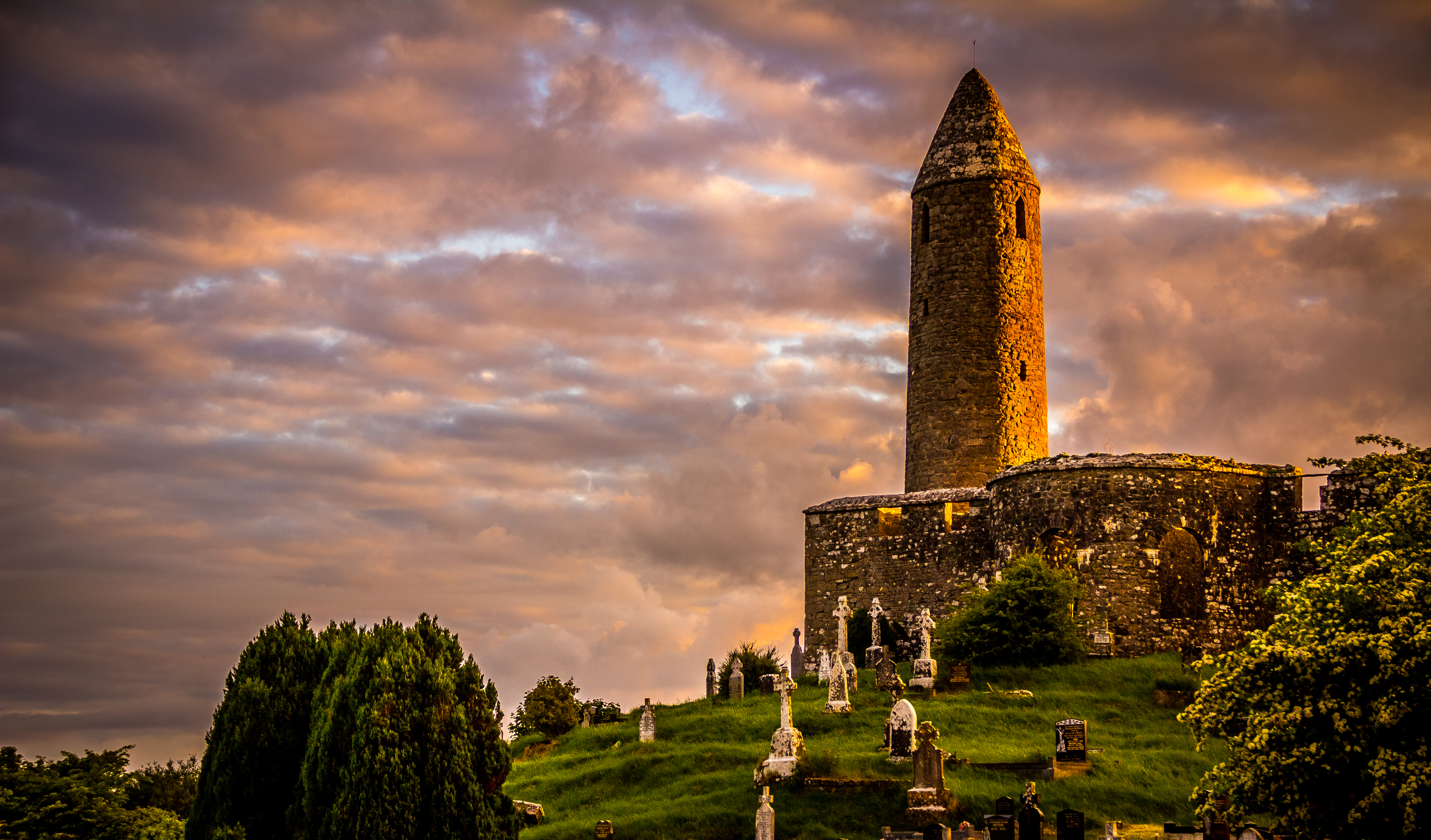
Turlough church and round tower at sunset

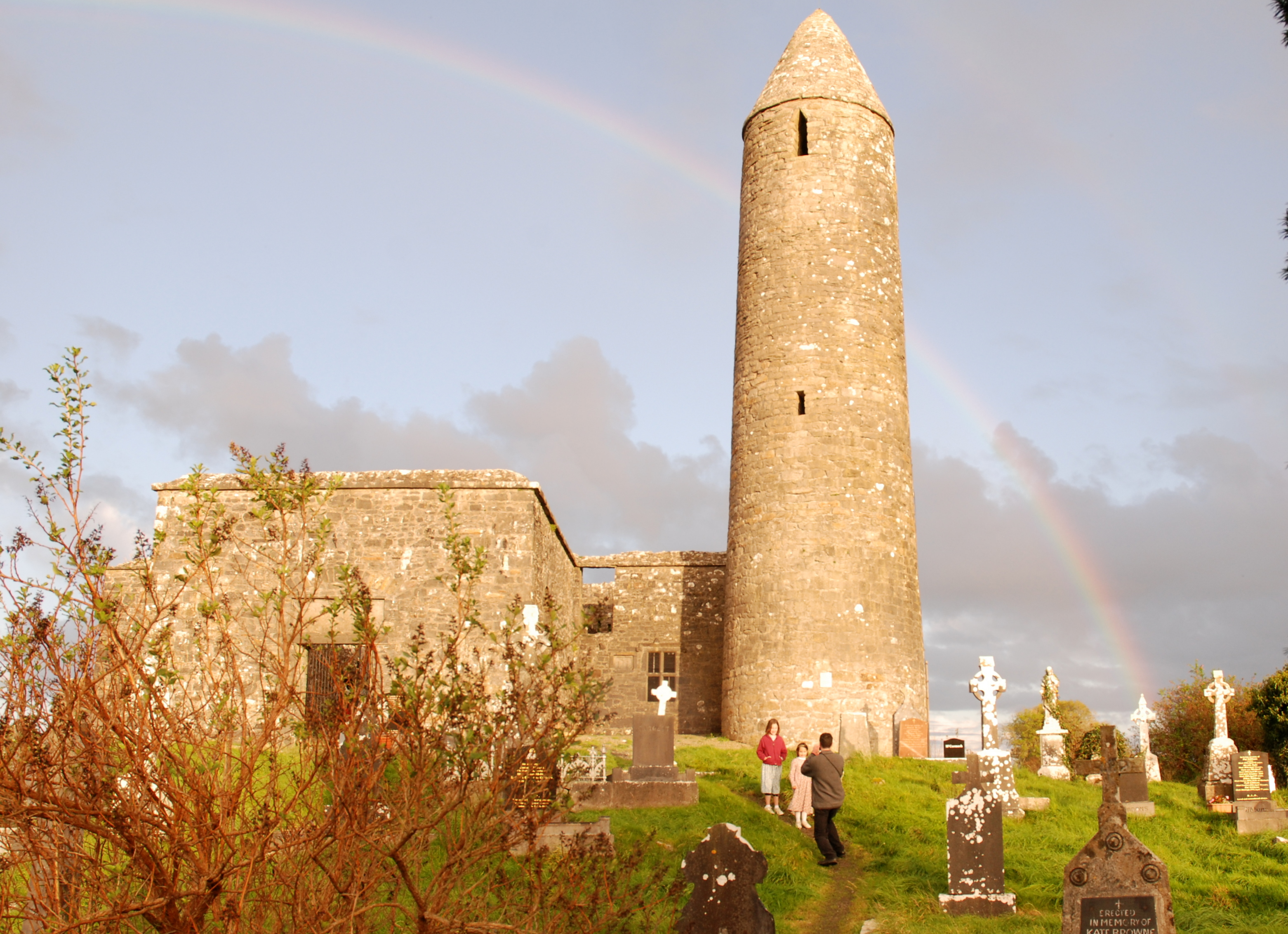
Turlough round tower

Turlough is an early monastic site, possibly founded in AD 441 by Saint Patrick.

In the ninth century an unusual low and squat round tower was constructed at the site.

In 1302 the Abbey was valued for the ecclesiastical taxation of Ireland. The Abbey survived the Dissolution of the Monasteries and a crucifixion plaque dated 1625 is an example of Counter-Reformation iconography.

The Abbey was finally dissolved and granted to Walter Burke or John Fitzgerald by King Charles I in 1635.

The site passed to the Fitzgeralds in 1653 and they were presumably responsible for the 18th century cruciform church with three round-headed windows in the chancel. Three crucifixion plaques have been built into the church. There is also the tomb of George Robert FitzGerald dated 1786.

== Buildings ==
The round tower is relatively low at 23 m (75 ft) tall, and wide with a rounded-headed doorway and four square-headed windows. It has a round-headed doorway 4 m (13 ft) above ground level.
