= Act of Settlement 1662 =

Act of the Parliament of Ireland

- Act of Parliament
- Parliament of Ireland
- Long title: An act for the better execution of His Majesty's gracious declaration for the Settlement of his Kingdom of Ireland, and the satisfaction of the several interests of adventurers, soldiers, and other his subjects there.
- Citation: 14 & 15 Chas. 2. Sess. 4. c. 2 (I)
- Territorial extent: Ireland

Dates
- Royal assent: 1662
- Commencement: 1662
- Repealed: 24 April 1829

Other legislation
- Amended by: Act of Explanation 1665
- Repealed by: Roman Catholic Relief Act 1829

Status: Repealed

Text of statute as originally enacted

The Act of Settlement 1662 (14 & 15 Chas. 2. Sess. 4. c. 2 (I)) was an act of the Irish Parliament in Dublin. It was a partial reversal of the Cromwellian Act for the Settlement of Ireland 1652, which punished Irish Catholics and Royalists for fighting against the Parliamentarians in the Wars of the Three Kingdoms by the wholesale confiscation of their lands and property. The act describes itself An act for the better execution of His Majesty's gracious declaration for the Settlement of his Kingdom of Ireland, and the satisfaction of the several interests of adventurers, (Note: Entrepreneurs, Merchant Adventurers – this refers to the Adventurers' Act 1640 passed by the English Parliament in 1642, which decreed that loans given to the Parliamentarians during the Civil Wars could be recouped by the creditors receiving land confiscated from those Irish Catholics who rebelled or remained neutral in the 1640s.) soldiers, and other his subjects there.

== Background ==
When the Rump Parliament in London passed the Act of Settlement 1652 after the Cromwellian conquest of Ireland, its purpose was two-fold. First, it was to provide for summary execution of the leaders and supporters of the Irish Rebellion of 1641. Second, it was to confiscate sufficient land in Ireland as was necessary to repay the loans advanced by the City of London under the Adventurers' Acts of the 1640s to pay for the war, and to reward the soldiers who had engaged in the war, almost all of whom sold on their interests to third parties. By 1652 the policy was achieved by the confiscation of almost all Catholic-owned land in Ireland, something that also served to punish Irish Catholics for their resistance to the Parliamentarians.

The 1652 act said (paragraphs VI, VII VIII) that anyone who fought against the parliament in Ireland during the civil wars would lose some lands.

- If they surrendered within the time allowed, they would be pardoned for their life, but lose up to two-thirds of their estates.
- If they did not surrender within the time allowed, they could stand to lose all their lands and even their lives.
- If they were "of the Popish religion" and had not taken any part in the wars, they would still lose a third of their lands unless they had actually fought for the parliament.

In practice, Protestant Royalists in Ireland could avoid confiscation by paying fines, while Catholics could not. Although some Parliamentarians talked about deporting all of the Irish people to Connacht, they only ever got around to the land-owning class. The 1652 Act ordered that all confiscated lands east of the Shannon (Ulster, Leinster and Munster) be cleared and the inhabitants transplant themselves to the west (to Connacht and County Clare), to be replaced by Puritan settlers (who were later to be known as Dissenters). As a result of this Settlement, Irish Catholic landholding fell from 60% before the Irish Confederate Wars to 8–9% during the period of Commonwealth rule (mostly in Connacht). A number of formerly Catholic landowners also saved their land by converting to the state religion.

== Act of Settlement 1662 ==
On the Irish Restoration of the Monarchy, those (notably the Duke of Ormonde) who had taken the Royalist side pleaded with the King for the injustices to be undone. Accordingly, the Parliament of Ireland (in Dublin) passed a new Act of Settlement 1662 which ordered that the Cromwellian settlers give up a portion of their allotted land to "Old English" and "innocent Catholics", as would be determined by Commissioners.

However, the Irish Parliament was still Protestant only, until the session of 1666, as Catholics had been barred from voting or standing for election under the Commonwealth. As a result, the Parliament amended the Act of Settlement 1652 so that land could be returned to "innocent Catholics" – that is ones who had been Royalists in the civil wars and had not carried out massacres of Protestant settlers – but only on the condition that the Cromwellian settlers be compensated with an equal amount of land elsewhere in Ireland. Since there was simply not enough land available for this to work, only the richer or grander Catholic landowners recovered their estates under this act. These included the Viscount Dillon, Donough MacCarty, 1st Earl of Clancarty, Murrough O'Brien, 1st Earl of Inchiquin, Luke, the heir of Christopher Plunket, 2nd Earl of Fingall and Edmund, the heir of Richard Butler, 3rd Viscount Mountgarret.

A further complication arose as the buyers of confiscated land in 1652–59 were third parties who expected that their purchases for cash were legal and were protected by privity of contract. This act was passed on 30 May 1662.

Also in 1662 the Irish version of the Tenures Abolition Act 1660 (12 Cha. 2. c. 24) was enacted, that formally ended Feudalism in Ireland.

== Act of Explanation 1665 ==
Act of Explanation 1665
- Act of Parliament
- Parliament of Ireland
- Long title: An Act for the Explaning of some Doubts, Arising upon an Act Intituled, "An Act for the better Execution of His Majesty's Gracious Declaration, for the Settlement of His Kingdom of Ireland, and Satisfaction of the several Interests of Adventurers Soldiers and other His Subjects;" and for making some Alterations of, and Additions unto the said Act, for the more Speedy and Effectual Settlement of the said Kingdom.
- Citation: 17 & 18 Chas. 2. c. 2 (I)
- Territorial extent: Ireland

Dates
- Royal assent: 1665
- Commencement: 1665

Other legislation
- Amends: Act of Settlement 1662

Status: Repealed

Text of statute as originally enacted

A Court of Claims, headed by Sir Richard Raynsford, was set up to investigate who was eligible for recovery of their lands. Unfortunately, the Commissioners found that too many Catholics were "innocent" and a further Act of Explanation 1665 (17 & 18 Chas. 2. c. 2 (I)) was needed to find a workable solution. The act stated that Cromwellian settlers (with some named exceptions) had to give up one-third of the lands they had received after 1652 to compensate innocent Catholics. This was a very complicated process, as most of the new owners had bought their land from the Cromwellian grantees, and so numerous contracts had to be unwound. Many of these buyers were not settlers but people who had already been living in Ireland before 1641.

By this measure, what has been described as a "favoured minority" of Irish Catholics – mostly Old English Royalists – recovered all or most of their pre-war estates. Examples of this include Ormonde and his relatives, and supporters like Richard Bellings or Randal MacDonnell, 1st Marquess of Antrim. The people who had been militant Irish Confederates during the wars – who had rejected an alliance with the Royalists, or sought better terms from Charles I in return for an alliance – got little or nothing from the settlement. Many of them regarded it as a betrayal by the Stuart monarchy, which they all had fought for at some point in the Civil Wars. The Catholic poet Dáibhí Ó Bruadair concluded that the Restoration was "Purgatory" for Irish Catholics, while the former Confederate and Catholic Bishop Nicholas French wrote a pamphlet about Charles II titled, The Unkind Deserter of Loyal men and true Friends.

In 1600, Catholics had owned 90 per cent of land in Ireland, by 1641, this was 41 per cent (the fall due largely to the rise of the Plantation of Ulster) but by the time of the accession of James II in 1685, after the Cromwellian Settlement, the proportion of Irish land owned by Catholics had fallen to 22 per cent; after the restrictive Treaty of Limerick (1691), that number had been reduced to 14 per cent, and by 1800, after more restrictive anti-Catholic Penal Laws, the number fell further to just 5 per cent. However, many of the 95% in 1800 had been Catholic and changed religion to keep their lands, such as the Barons of Dunsany.

Many Protestants in Ireland felt that the Restoration Settlements were far too lenient towards those Irish Catholics who had rebelled against the sovereignty of King Charles in 1641 and had been justly punished for it by the loss of their property and power. They had bought their new properties at market rates, competing against other bidders, and expected that privity of contract would apply as usual. As in England and Scotland, the Irish Restoration of 1660 had occurred without bloodshed because of their approval.

Historian Jane Ohlmeyer argued that the matter of religion was not as important as one's rank in the 1660s. Richer and grander families tended to be supported by King Charles, regardless of religion. Some Protestant landed families were crypto-Catholics. Other grantees included the King's brother James, Duke of York, who was awarded 130,000 acres in Ireland and became a Catholic. The final awards of land were not concluded by King Charles until about 1670.

== Effect on the Williamite Settlement ==
As neither "side" was happy with the outcome, and as the Irish gentry remained divided, the next conflict engendered much more radical proposals by each side. In 1689 James II's Patriot Parliament approved an Act of Attainder in which 2,000 (some say 3,000) of the newer landowners would be dispossessed without compensation. The Cromwellian Settlement of 1652 was repealed and all lands taken after the 1641 Rebellion would revert to the heirs of the former owners. The supporters of William III and Mary II, who won the war, proposed to indict over 3,900 of their enemies and confiscate their property, and in the ensuing "Williamite Settlement" over 2,000 lost their property to the "Commissioners of Forfeitures" which was sold on in the 1690s.
