= George Robert FitzGerald =

George Robert Fitzgerald, a.k.a. Fighting Fitzgerald (c.1748 – 12 June 1786) was a celebrated Irish eccentric, duellist and landowner, who was hanged for conspiracy to murder in 1786.

== Biography ==
FitzGerald came from Turlough, near Castlebar, County Mayo, eldest son of the landowner and magistrate George FitzGerald and Lady Mary Hervey, and grandson of Thomas FitzGerald of Turlough. He was of an upper-class family, being the nephew on his mother's side of Frederick Augustus Hervey, 4th Earl of Bristol and Bishop of Derry, while his father claimed kinship with the extinct family of the Earl of Desmond. His parents, whose marriage was unhappy, separated a few years after his birth, and his mother took the children to England, where George was educated at Eton College. Thereafter he spent some time in the Army.

A highly eccentric character, he is said to have become so after a blow to the head sometime in his 20s. He was for a time a popular figure in Paris and London, but his passion for gambling and his repeated refusal to pay his gambling debts, destroyed his reputation. On one celebrated occasion the future King Charles X of France had him thrown out of a gambling den in Paris; he had no redress since as a commoner he could not challenge Charles to a duel. Despite his quarrelsome nature he also had a reputation for charm and courtesy.

Most of his later life was spent on his paternal estate in County Mayo. There he hunted by torchlight, terrified his friends by keeping bears and other ferocious animals as pets, erected a fort and set the law at defiance (although he did make some effort to improve the property). He even held his father to ransom for a sum of £3,000, while his brother Charles brought an action against him for abduction and false imprisonment, leading to his being briefly imprisoned.

== Family ==
In 1770 he married Jane, daughter of William James Conolly and Lady Anne Wentworth, by whom he had a daughter, but the marriage effectively ended as soon as he had spent her dowry. Jane died in 1780. Her widower posed as being inconsolable with grief, which struck most people as absurd, considering how much he had neglected her. He later remarried Sydney Vaughan, only daughter of Matthew Vaughan of Ballina, County Mayo. His daughter was raised by relatives in England; she died in 1794, reputedly from the shock of reading about her father's exploits, of which she had been kept in ignorance, in a magazine.

== Duels ==
He fought many duels, perhaps thirty in all, including one with Richard Martin ("Humanity Dick") in the barrack's yard of Castlebar, in which both were wounded. Another, with a Mr. French, also occurred in Castlebar. French was accused of rustling cattle from Fitzgerald's father; the duel "is said to have started near the bridge at the bottom of Main Street and proceeded with the contestants jumping from one side of the street to the other, smashing traders' stalls in the process. The duel ended on Ellison Street and there appears to have been no serious injury to the pair".

== Trial and Execution ==
FitzGerald was hanged at Castlebar on 12 June 1786 for conspiracy to murder Patrick Randall McDonnell, an attorney who had acted for his father in their legal disputes, and with whom in consequence, he had a longstanding feud. He was executed along with his law agent, Timothy Brecknock.

FitzGerald had used his power as a Justice of the Peace to have McDonnell arrested and imprisoned on a spurious charge: McDonnell attempted to escape and was shot dead in the attempt. The actual killer was another of FitzGerald's employees, Andrew Craig (who turned King's evidence against FitzGerald and Brecknock). FitzGerald maintained that he had never intended to kill McDonnell, and argued that in all his duels he had never killed anyone. Brecknock, though he had his own separate quarrel with McDonnell, also vigorously denied any part in his death. Both were found guilty and executed.
