= St Patrick halfpenny =

17th-century coin

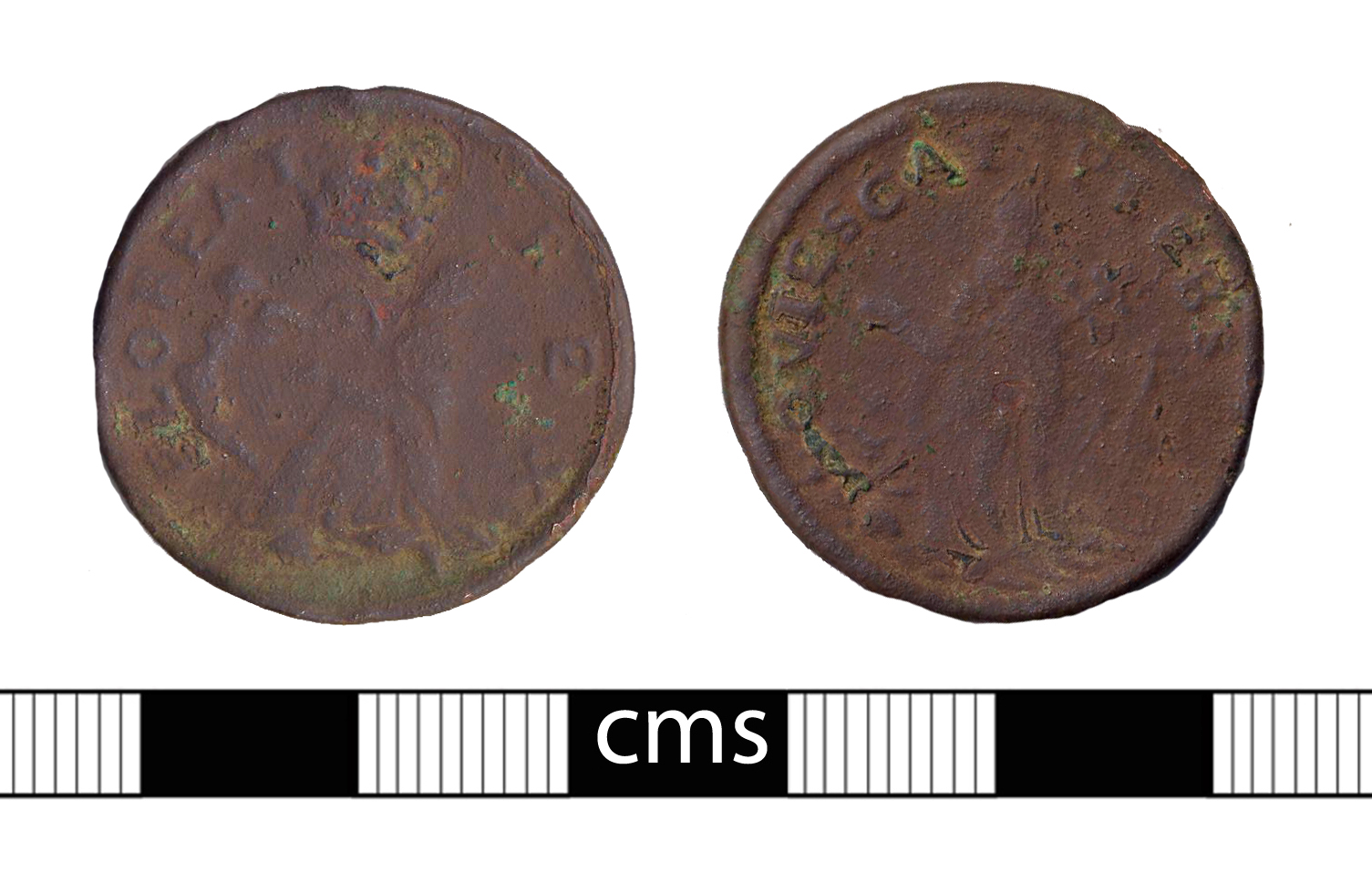
St Patrick token, dated to between 1658 and 1670. The coin is heavily worn but the legends FLOREAT REX and QUIESCAT PLEBS are legible.

The St Patrick halfpenny was a milled coin minted in the 17th century in England, Ireland and Wales, and also used in the Isle of Man and West New Jersey. The reverse design shows King David kneeling playing a harp while gazing up at the royal crown of England. One peculiarity of the harp is that it bears a semi-nude winged female figure on the pillar, a feature which became common on English coins beginning in the second quarter of the 17th century. The Latin legend on the obverse reads FLOREAT REX ('May the King flourish'). It had a value of half a penny, i.e. 1/24 shilling or 1/480 pound.

== St Patrick ==
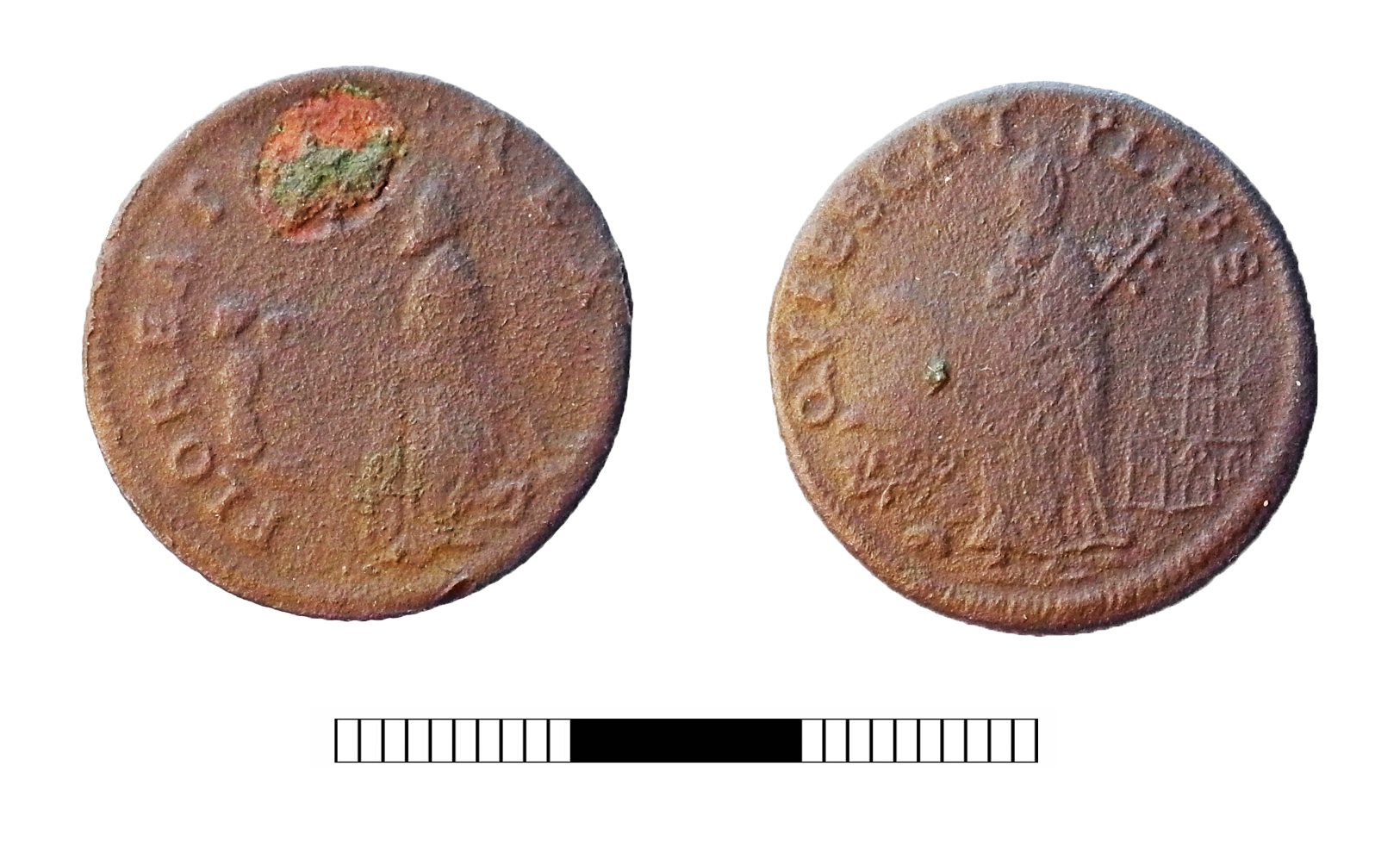
St Patrick halfpenny found in Hampshire.

The obverse of the smaller copper halfpenny shows Saint Patrick dressed in bishop's garments wearing a mitre and holding a double-cross crozier. He is depicted dispelling the serpents from Ireland that are portrayed as various aquatic beasts, some fabulous. In the background is possibly St Patrick's Cathedral, Dublin. The legend reads QUIESCAT PLEBS ('May the People Be at Peace').

On the larger copper specimens St Patrick is seen preaching to a crowd gathered round him. To his right is a shield with devices of several towers usually interpreted as three, suggesting the arms of Dublin. The legend reads ECCE GREX ('Behold the Flock'). The majority of these St Patrick halfpennies are copper coins with a splash of brass minted in two sizes, large and small. Several known specimens exist in silver and one in gold, though reports of pewter and lead have also been made. The silver and gold specimens are minted on the smaller copper dies. The splash of brass on the obverse of the copper coins is possibly intended to create the illusion that the crown that King David glances at is made of gold.

== Unknown origin ==
Where these coins were minted is still uncertain. One suggestion is they were minted at the Tower of London. When these coins were minted has been the subject of debate for the past two hundred and sixty years. Proposed dates for these coins have been 1641–1642; 1667–1669; 1672–1674. The current thinking is they were minted between 1646 and 1660 before the official reign of Charles II, while he was in exile, due to new documents recently discovered by John N. Lupia and published in the C4 Newsletter 2008. Who coined them and the circumstances surrounding them is still uncertain. Two candidates: Pierre Blondeau or Nicholas Briot have been proposed as the designer of these coins, but both the former suggestion seem unlikely. John N. Lupia has published in the C4 Newsletter 2009 new documentary evidence that shows both the small and large copper coins are halfpence. The small issue was minted 1646–1660, and the larger from 1688 to 1690.

One smaller copper specimen bears a counterstamp along the base of the obverse that reads MDLIII, which may suggest a date of 1553, but that is far too early to be taken seriously.

It is purported that about 450 different die varieties exist of this series on the small coin. Approximately 1,100 specimens are known in census. The number of coins minted has been guessed to be somewhere in the vicinity of approximately 1,500,000 to more than 7,000,000 pieces.

== Further afield ==
Sometime prior to 1678 an unknown quantity of these St Patrick coins were brought to the Isle of Man. An Act of Tynwald on 24 June 1679 demonetised them as of 15 January 1680, thus making subsequent specimens there extremely rare.

In 1681 it is supposed that Mark Newby, a Quaker who emigrated from Ireland, had brought a substantial quantity of these copper coins to North America when he relocated to West New Jersey, settling in Camden. On 18 May 1682 he was instrumental in having these coppers made legal tender in the region.

Numismatists classify the various die varieties according to the schemes proposed by Walter Breen and Robert Vlack giving them Breen or Vlack numbers followed by letters. The die varieties for the larger coin have been completely documented by Dr Roger Moore, Stanley E. Stevens and Robert Vlack, in the Colonial Newsletter 2005.

== Bibliography ==
- Breen, Walter, "Comments on St. Patrick Halfpence and Farthings" The Colonial Newsletter No. 7 (April 1968, serial no. 22), pp. 214–17
- Breen, Walter, "Additional Comments on St. Patrick Farthings" The Colonial Newsletter No. 7 (December 1968, serial no. 24), p. 233
- Crosby, Sylvester S., The Early Coins of America (Lawrence, Massachusetts: 1974)
- Danforth, Brian J., "New Interpretations on Irish Coppers in the American Colonies: The St. Patrick, Wood's Hibernia and Voce Populi Series", Coinage of the Americas Conference paper, notice in: E-Sylum: Volume 6, Number 18, 4 May 2003 (Numismatic Bibliomania Society)
- Frazer, William, “On the Irish 'St. Patrick' or 'Floreat Rex' coinage", subsequently circulated in New Jersey by Mark Newbie, with reasons for connecting it with Lord Glamorgan's attempts to levy troops in Ireland for Charles I", Journal of the Royal Society of Antiquaries of Ireland Vol. XXV/Series V, Vol. V, December 1895, pp. 338–47
- Hodder, Michael, "The Saint Patrick Copper Token Coinage: A Re-evaluation of the Evidence", The Colonial Newsletter #27 (November 1987/Serial no. 77), pp. 1016–18
- Horan, J. J., “Some observations and speculations on St. Patrick halfpence and farthings”, The Colonial Newsletter #15 (October 1976/Serial no. 47): p. 567.
- Lupia, John N., "At Least A Million Patricks", The C-4 Newsletter 2008
- Lupia, John, "The Two St. Patrick Coinages : The Smaller circa 1646–1660, and the Larger circa 1688," The C-4 Newsletter, No. 4, Winter 2009 : 8–19
- Martin, Sydney F., "Saint Patrick Coinage: For Ireland and New Jersey", 2018, (Google books)
- Newman, Eric, "Circulation of St. Patrick Farthings in America, The Colonial Newsletter #7 (July 1968, serial no. 220)
- Moore, Roger, Stanley E. Steven, Robert Vlack, "Update of the Vlack Attribution of St. Patrick Halpence With Visual Guide," Colonial Newsletter, Volume 45, No.3, December, Serial No. 129 (2005) : 2921–2928.
- Seaby, W.A., “A St Patrick halfpenny of John de Courci”, British Numismatic Journal #29, (1958/59): pp. 87–90
- Sharp, Michael. "The St. Patrick Coinage of Charles II", British Numismatic Journal 68 (1998), p. 160
- Vlack, Robert A., "Die Varieties of St. Patrick Halfpence", The Colonial Newsletter #7 (January 1968, serial no. 21), pp. 199–202
- Vlack, Robert A., Early American Coins (Johnson City New York, 1965)
