= Settlement =

Settlement may refer to:

- Human settlement, a community where people live
- Settlement (structural), downward movement of a structure's foundation
- Settlement (finance), where securities are delivered against payment of money
- Settlement (litigation), a resolution between disputing parties about a legal case
- Settlement (trust), a deed whereby property is given by a settlor into trust
- Thomson Bay Settlement, Rottnest Island, Western Australia, also known as simply The Settlement
- Closing (real estate), the final step in executing a real estate transaction
- Israeli settlement, Israeli build communities in the occupied territories

== See also ==
- Act of Settlement (disambiguation), various legislation
- Settlement Act, or Poor Relief Act 1662
- Collective settlement, another name for an intentional community
- Collective settlement (litigation), a legal term
- Sedentism, the practice of living in one place for a long time
- Settlement geography, investigating the part of the Earth's surface settled by humans
- Settlement movement, a Victorian era reformist social movement
- Settlement school, social reform institutions established in rural Appalachia in the early 20th century
- Settler colonialism, replacing the original population with a new society of settlers
- Soil consolidation, a process by which soils decrease in volume
- Squatting, occupying an abandoned building
- Structured settlement, a negotiated financial or insurance arrangement
