= Act for the Settlement of Ireland 1652 =

English act after the 1641 Irish Rebellion

- Act of Parliament
- Parliament of England
- Long title: An Act for the Setling of Ireland.
- Territorial extent: England and Wales

Dates
- Commencement: 12 August 1652
- Repealed: 1662

Other legislation
- Repealed by: Act of Settlement 1662

Status: Revoked

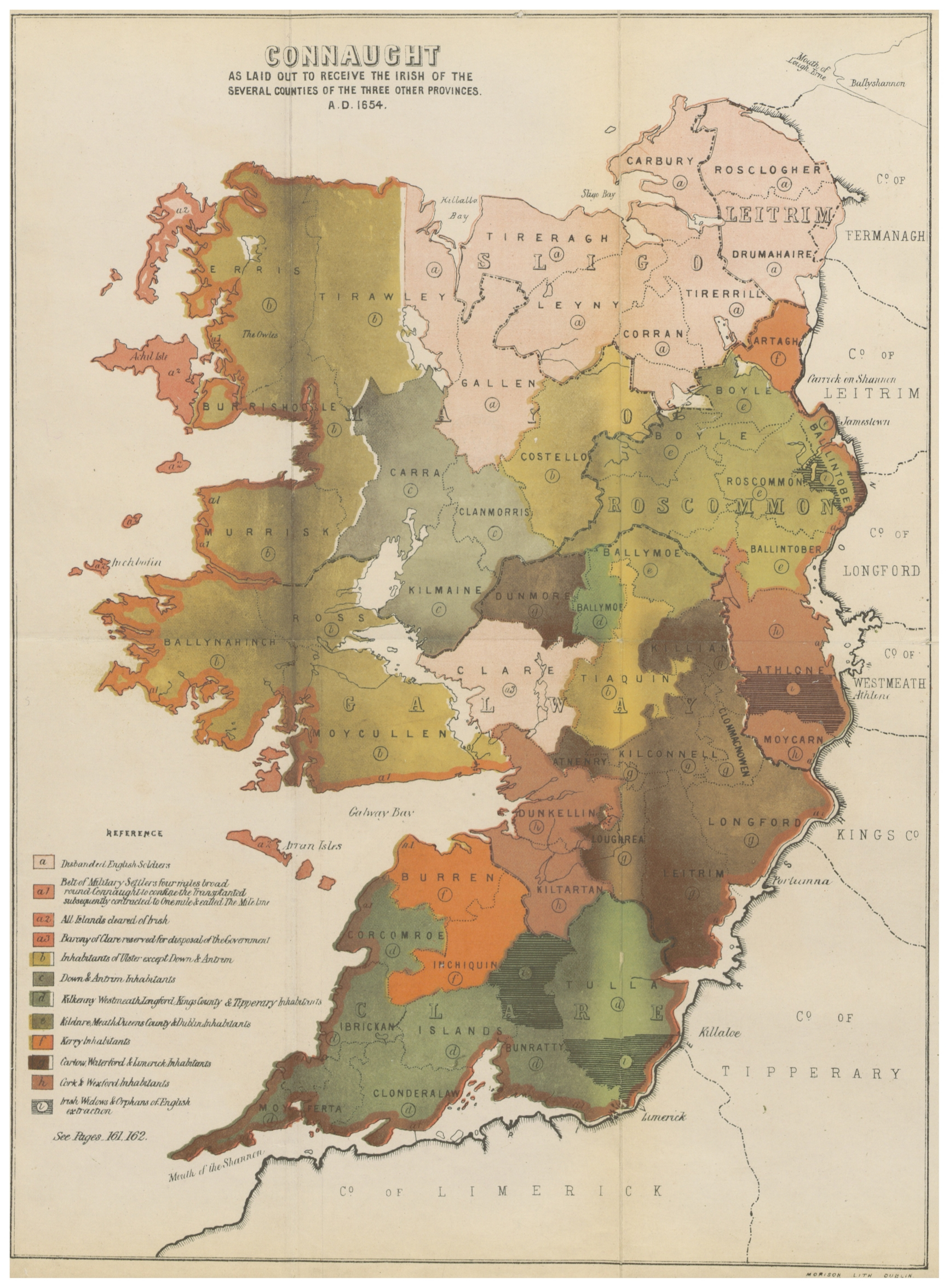
Map of land west of the River Shannon allocated to the native Irish after expulsion from their lands. Note that all islands were "cleared of Irish" and a belt one mile wide around the coastline was reserved for English settlers.

The Act for the Settling of Ireland imposed penalties including death and land confiscation against Irish civilians and combatants after the Irish Rebellion of 1641 and subsequent unrest. British historian John Morrill wrote that the act and associated forced movements represented "perhaps the greatest exercise in ethnic cleansing in early modern Europe".

== Background ==
The act was passed on 12 August 1652 by the Rump Parliament of England, which had taken power after the Second English Civil War and had agreed to the Cromwellian conquest of Ireland. The conquest was deemed necessary as Royalist supporters of Charles II of England had allied themselves with the Confederation of Kilkenny (the confederation formed by Irish Catholics during the Irish Confederate Wars) and so were a threat to the newly formed English Commonwealth. The Rump Parliament had a large independent Dissenter membership who strongly empathised with the plight of the settlers of the Ulster Plantation, who had suffered greatly at the start of the Irish Rebellion of 1641 and whose suffering had been exaggerated by Protestant propaganda, so the Act was also a retribution against those Irish Catholics who had started or prolonged the war.

Also money to pay for the wars had been raised under the 1642 Adventurers' Act, that repaid creditors with land forfeited by the 1641 rebels. These and other creditors had mostly resold their property interests to local landowners who wanted these recent property transfers reconfirmed by an over-riding Act, for the avoidance of doubt.

== Preamble ==
Whereas the Parliament of England, after the expence of much Blood and Treasure for suppression of the horrid Rebellion in Ireland, have by the good Hand of God upon their undertakings, brought that Affair to such an Issue, as that a total Reducement and Settlement of that Nation may, with Gods blessing, be speedily effected ... — Act for the Settlement of Ireland 1652 Part of Preamble

Ten named leaders of the Royalist forces in Ireland, together with anyone who had participated in the Irish Rebellion's early stages and who had killed an Englishman other than in battle, lost their lives and estates. (Note: all and every person and persons, who at any time before the tenth day of November 1642 (being the time of the sitting of the first General Assembly at Kilkenny in Ireland), have contrived, advised, counselled, promoted, or acted, the rebellion, murders, or massacres done or committed in Ireland, which began in the year 1641; or have at any time before the said tenth day of November 1642, by bearing arms, or contributing men, arms, horse, plate, money, victual, or other furniture or hablements of war (other than such which they shall make to appear to have been taken from them by mere force and violence), aided, assisted, promoted, acted, prosecuted, or abetted the said rebellion, murders, or massacres; — Act for the Settlement of Ireland 1652. Paragraph I all and every Jesuit, priest, and other person or persons who have received orders from the Pope or See of Rome, or any authority derived from the same, that have any ways contrived, advised, counselled, promoted, continued, countenanced, aided, assisted, or abetted; or at any time hereafter shall any ways contrive, advise, counsel, promote, continue, countenance, aid, assist, or abet the rebellion or war in Ireland, or any the murders or massacres, robberies, or violences committed against the Protestants, English, or others there. — Act for the Settlement of Ireland 1652. Paragraph II That all and every person and persons (both principals and accessories) who since the first of October 1641, have or shall kill, slay, or otherwise destroy any person or persons in Ireland, which at the time of their being so killed, slain, or destroyed, were not publicly entertained and maintained in arms as officers or private soldiers, for and on behalf of the English against the Irish; and all and every person and persons (both principals and accessories) who since the said first day of October 1641, have killed, slain, or otherwise destroyed any person or persons entertained and maintained as officers or private soldiers, for and on the behalf of the English against the Irish (the said persons so killing, slaying, or otherwise destroying, not being then publicly entertained and maintained in arms as officer or private soldier under the command and pay of the Irish nation against the English). — Act for the Settlement of Ireland 1652. Paragraph IV)

== Exclusion list ==
The Act includes a list of a 104 men who were excluded from pardon for life and estate. This list includes members of the nobility, the landed gentry, army officers, and clergy. It includes royalists as well as supporters of the Confederation. The first ten people on this list are:

1. James Butler, 12th Earl of Ormond
2. James Touchet, 3rd Earl of Castlehaven
3. Ulick Bourke, 5th Earl of Clanricarde
4. Christopher Plunket, 2nd Earl of Fingal
5. James Dillon, 3rd Earl of Roscommon
6. Richard Nugent, 2nd Earl of Westmeath
7. Murrough O'Brien, Baron of Inchiquin,
8. Donough MacCarty, 2nd Viscount Muskerry,
9. Theobald Taaffe, 1st Viscount Taaffe of Corren,
10. Richard Butler, 3rd Viscount Mountgarret.

The list does not recognise many of the titles created by Charles I and Charles II, such as James Butler's Marquessate of Ormond, created on 30 August 1633

The Act made a distinction between the rebels of 1641 – who were deemed unlawful combatants – as against those who had fought in the regular armies of Confederate Ireland, who were treated as legitimate combatants provided that they had surrendered before the end of 1652. The 1641 rebels and the above-mentioned Royalist leaders were excluded from the pardon given to soldiers who had surrendered: they were to be executed when captured. Roman Catholic clergy were also excluded from the pardon, as the Cromwellians held them responsible for fomenting the Irish Rebellion of 1641.

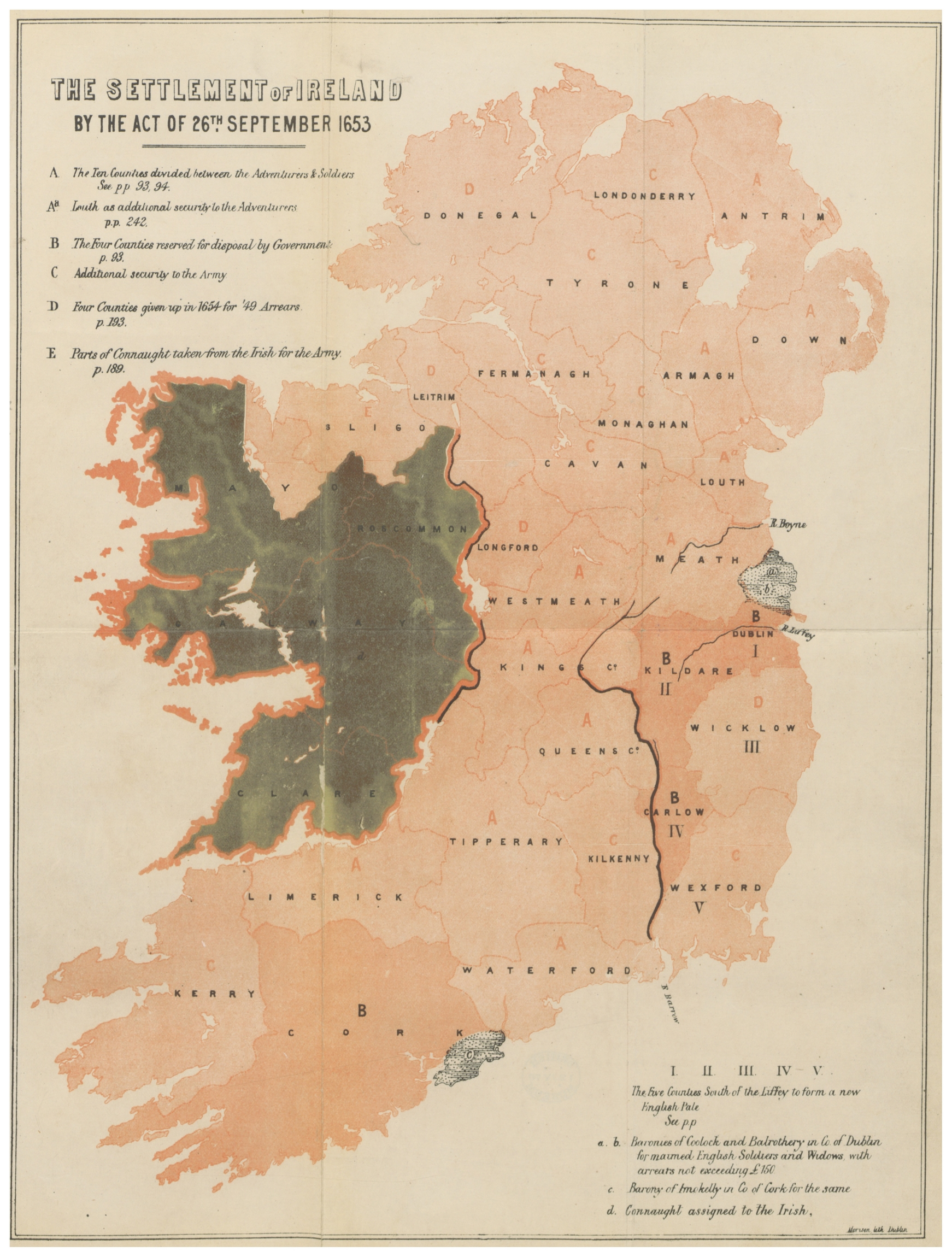
After Cromwell's victory, huge areas of land were confiscated from the Gaelic nobility and the Irish Catholics were banished to the lands of Connacht.

The remaining leaders of the Irish army lost the vast majority of their estates, causing Catholic land ownership to fall to just 8% across the island. To have been merely a bystander was itself a crime, and anyone who had resided in Ireland any time from 1 October 1649, to 1 March 1650 and had not "manifested their constant good affection to the interest of the Commonwealth of England" lost three-quarters of their land. The Commissioners in Ireland had power to give them, in lieu thereof, other (poorer) lands in Connacht or County Clare in proportion of value and were authorised "to transplant such persons from the respective places of their usual habitation or residence, into such other places within that nation, as shall be judged most consistent with public safety."

This was interpreted by the English Parliamentarian authorities in Ireland who ordered all Irish land owners to leave for those lands before 1 May 1654 or be executed. However, in practice, most Catholic landowners stayed on their land as tenants and the numbers of those either transplanted or executed was small.

Protestant Royalists, on the other hand, could avoid land confiscations if they had surrendered by May 1650 and had paid fines to the Parliamentarian government. The Commonwealth initially had harsh plans to remove the formerly-Scottish Presbyterians from north-east Ulster – as they had fought with the Royalists in the later stages of the war. However, this was reversed in 1654, and it was ruled that the plantation would apply to Catholics only.

== To Hell or to Connaught ==
In Irish popular memory of the Cromwellian Plantation, the Commonwealth is said to have declared that all the Catholic Irish must go "to Hell or to Connaught", west of the River Shannon. However, according to historian Padraig Lenihan, "The Cromwellians did not proclaim 'To Hell or to Connaught'. Connaught was chosen as a native reservation not because the land was poor; The Commonwealth rated Connaught above Ulster in this respect". Lenihan suggests that County Clare was chosen instead for security reasons – to keep Catholic landowners penned between the sea and the river Shannon. The Cromwellian transplantation, particularly in Ulster, is often cited as an early modern example of ethnic cleansing.

Some Irish prisoners were forcibly sent on ships to the West Indies where they became indentured servants on sugar cane plantations belonging to British colonialists. One of the best known islands the Irish flocked to when their period of indenture came to an end was Montserrat.

The reality was that a landowner and his family might be dispossessed and awarded land in Connacht, and be obliged to live there, generally as a tenant farmer. An example was Thomas FitzGerald of Turlough, whose parents were moved from Gorteens Castle to land granted in Turlough, County Mayo. The vast majority of the population, outside the 6 counties that would later be partitioned into Northern Ireland, were expected to remain where they lived, and to continue as tenant farmers or servants under the new freeholders.

== Plantation ==
In the next of the Plantations of Ireland, the confiscated land was granted to the "Adventurers". The new owners were known as "planters". The Adventurers were financiers who had loaned the Parliament £10 million in 1642, specifically to reverse the 1641 rebellion, and the Act had been signed into law by Charles I just before the start of the Wars of the Three Kingdoms (see Adventurers' Act 1640). Many of Ireland's pre-war Protestant inhabitants also took advantage of the confiscation of Catholic-owned land to increase their own holdings, buying land off the Adventurers. In addition, smaller grants of land were given to 12,000 veterans of the New Model Army who had served in Ireland, much of which was also resold. Decisions on confiscations and awards were based on mapping and data in the Down Survey made in 1655–56.

=== Confirmation ===
In June 1657, the Act of Settlement 1657 "for the Assuring, Confirming and Settling of lands and estates in Ireland" ratified previous decrees, judgments, grants and instructions made or given by the various officers and councils in applying the 1652 Act.

=== Mitigation ===
All Ordinances and Acts of Parliament passed during the English Civil War and the Interregnum were considered void after the English Restoration as they had not received Royal assent.

In 1662, an Act of Settlement 1662 (after the Restoration) aimed to reduce its effect on Protestant and "innocent Catholics". This Act returned some lands to prominent Irish Royalists, but left most of the land confiscated from Irish Catholics in Protestant hands.

== See also ==
- Erasmus Smith

== Bibliography ==
- Firth, Charles Harding; Rait, R. S. (1911), The Acts and Ordinances of the Interregnum, [Laws, etc.], vol. 2, London: H. M. Stationery Office
