= Closer Settlement Acts =

The Closer Settlement Acts (NSW) were introduced by the New South Wales parliament between 1901 and 1909 to reform land holdings and in particular to break the squatters' domination of land tenure.

The acts included:

- the Closer Settlement Act 1901 (No. 7)
- the Closer Settlement Act 1904 (No. 37)
- the Closer Settlement (Amendment) Act 1906 (No. 44)
- the Closer Settlement (Amendment) Act 1907 (No. 12)
- the Closer Settlement (Amendment) Act 1909 (No. 21)

== See also ==
- Nineteen Counties
