= Act of Settlement 1657 =

Act of the Parliament of England

The Act of Settlement 1657 was an act of the Cromwellian Parliament aimed at the Assuring, Confirming and Settling lands and estates in Ireland. The Act received its third reading on 8 June 1657, and was assented to by the Lord Protector the following day. Its purpose was to ratify previous decrees, judgments, grants and instructions issued by the various officers and councils in the implementation of the Act for the Settlement of Ireland 1652.
