= Castlebar =

Town in County Mayo, Ireland

Castlebar Caisleán an Bharraigh (Irish)
- Town
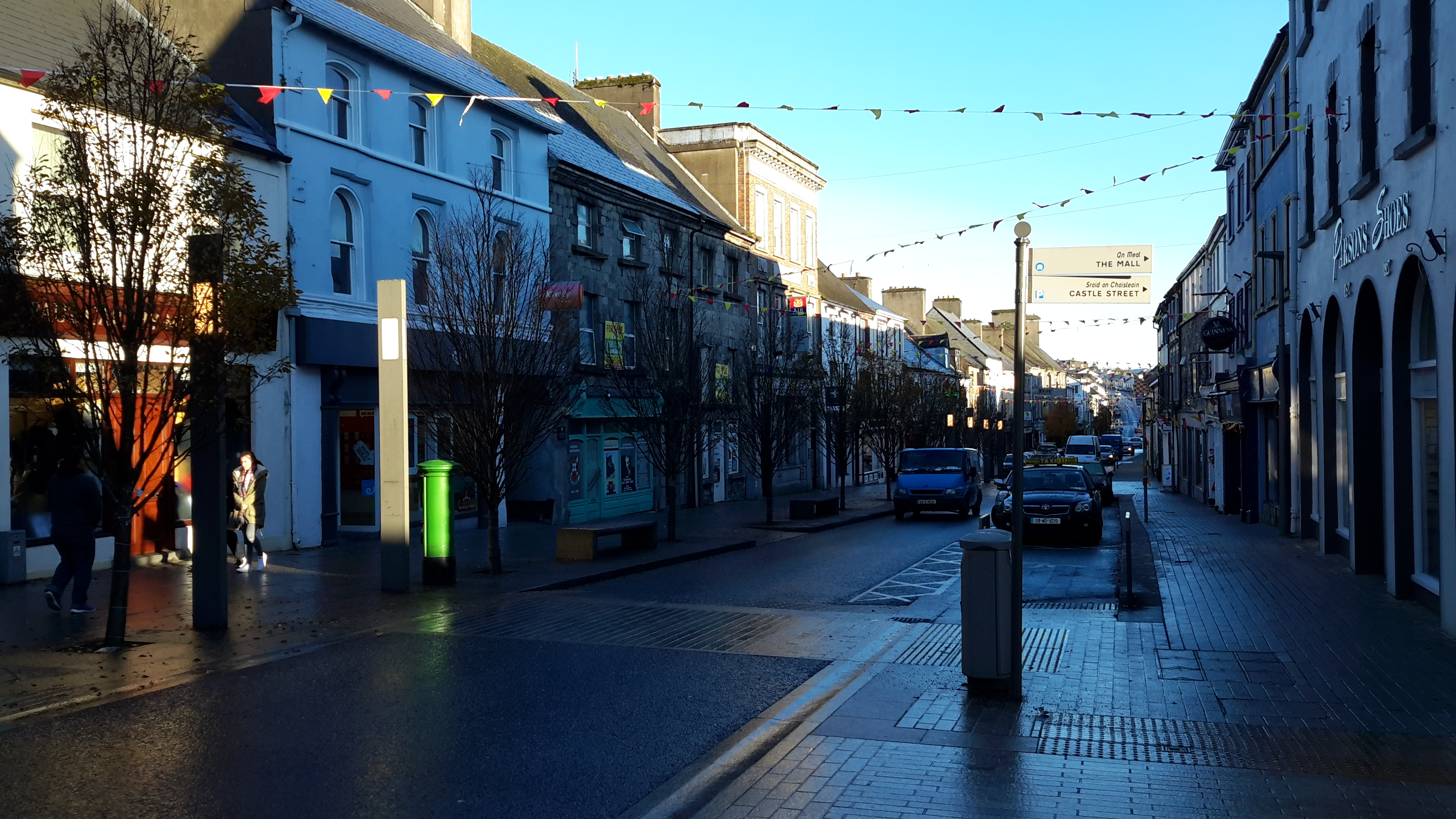
- Market Street, the main street of Castlebar

- Coat of arms
- Motto: Ar Aghaidh (Meaning: Forward)
- Location in Ireland
- Coordinates: 53.8608°N 9.29880°W
- Country: Ireland
- Province: Connacht
- County: County Mayo
- Founded: 1235
- Incorporated: 1613
- Elevation: 49 m (161 ft)

Population (2022)
  - Total: 13,054
- Time zone: UTC±0 (WET)
  - Summer (DST): UTC+1 (IST)
- Eircode routing key: F23
- Telephone area code: +353(0)94
- Irish Grid Reference: M146905
- Website: www.castlebar.ie

Castlebar (Irish: Caisleán an Bharraigh, meaning 'Barry's Castle') is the county town of County Mayo, Ireland. Developing around a 13th-century castle of the de Barry family, from which the town got its name, Castlebar is now a social and economic focal point for the surrounding hinterland. With a population of 13,054 in the 2022 census (up from 7,648 in the 1991 census), Castlebar was one of Ireland's fastest-growing towns in the early 21st century.

A campus of Atlantic Technological University and the Country Life section of the National Museum are two important facilities in the area. The town is linked by railway to Dublin, Westport and Ballina. The main route by road is the N5.

== History ==
=== Antiquity ===
The 5th century saw the construction of Turlough Abbey near Castlebar.

=== Medieval period ===
In the early medieval period, the Castlebar area was dominated by Gaelic clans, notably the Quinns (Ó Coinn), who lent their name to the parish of Aglishcowane, meaning "Church of Ó Coinn". The area featured crannogs and ringforts, indicative of early settlement patterns.

The Norman invasion of Ireland in the late 12th century brought significant changes. By 1235, the invading de Barra (Barry) family had established a castle on the banks of the Castlebar River, around which the town developed. This castle, known as Caisleán an Bharraigh, gave the town its name. The de Barra's stronghold later came under the control of the de Burgo (Burke) family, who faced challenges from other clans and English forces. The castle was located at the end of Castle Street, where the town river is thought to have originally flowed.

In 1586, Sir John Bingham was granted the castle by his brother Sir Richard Bingham, the Governor of Connacht, marking the beginning of English administrative influence and the start of the Bingham baronets of Castlebar, who would rule Castlebar for generations.

The town was granted a charter of incorporation in 1613 by James I of England. Under the charter the town had a portreeve (mayor) and a fifteen-member corporation and was entitled to elect two members to the Parliament of Ireland.

=== 18th century ===
The Linen Hall, established as a clearing house for local linen materials, was completed in 1790.

==== Races of Castlebar ====
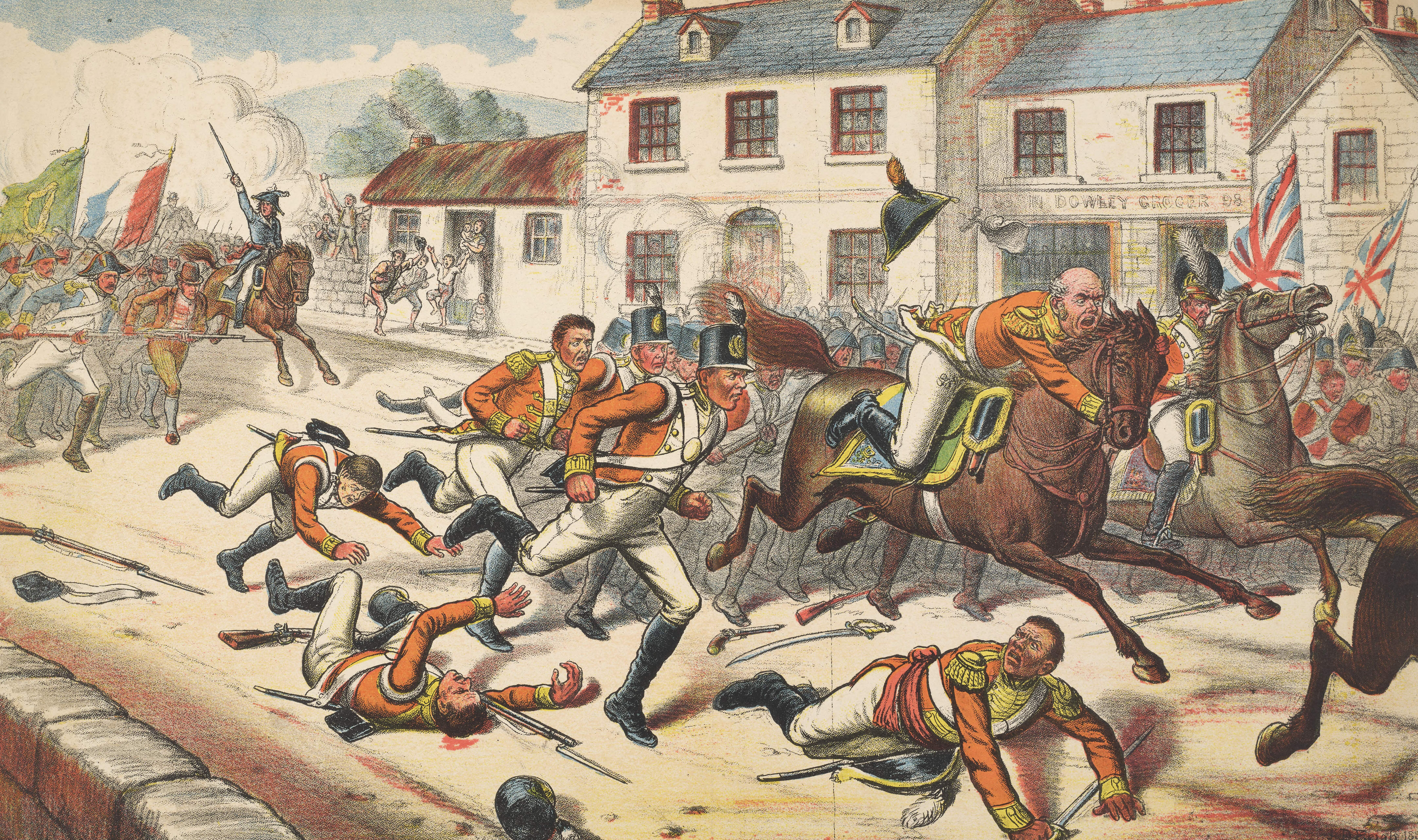
Print depicting the "Castlebar Races" of 1798

Following the Races of Castlebar, Castlebar became a part of the short-lived "Republic of Connacht"

Armed conflict has been the centrepiece of the town's historical heritage. French forces under the command of General Jean Humbert aided in a rout of the defending garrison in the town during the failed Irish Rebellion of 1798, which was so comprehensive it would later be known as "The Races of Castlebar". A short-lived provisional Irish Republic had been declared upon General Humbert's arrival at Killala. Following the victory at Castlebar John Moore, head of the Mayo United Irishmen and the brother of a local landowner, was declared president of the Province of Connacht. His remains are today interred in a corner of the town green, known as the Mall

=== 19th century ===
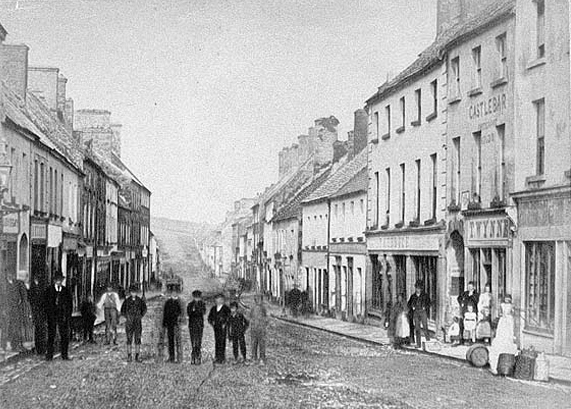
Castlebar, circa 1880

Castlebar Military Barracks was established in 1834: it was finally closed in March 2012 and the buildings and grounds have been purchased by the local town and county councils.

During the mid-19th Century (including the period of the Great Irish famine), George Bingham, 3rd Earl of Lucan became known as "The Exterminator" for his ruthless actions against his tenants in the Castlebar area. The third Lord Lucan earned his nickname by carrying out mass evictions of tenants who were unable to pay rent. This period saw widespread starvation in the area, leading to the deaths of thousands and the emigration of many more. In contrast, the fourth Earl was a more favourable figure locally. He lowered rents, donated land for schools and the Catholic church, and his successor, George Bingham, 4th Earl of Lucan, gifted the town centre park, known as the Mall, to the people of Castlebar in 1922.

The Irish National Land League was founded by Michael Davitt, of Straide in County Mayo, at the Imperial Hotel in Castlebar on 21 October 1879. The Land League sought to directly challenge Anglo-Irish landlords such as the Binghams and fought for tenants rights.

=== 20th century ===
==== Western Hat Factory and Little Jerusalem ====
In 1939, Castlebar became a refuge for Jews escaping Central Europe. Members of that community established the Western Hat Factory, officially opened on 1 May 1940 under the direction of Franz Schmolka, a Slovak Jewish industrialist. The factory became one of the most significant employers in the town, at its height providing work for up to 270 people. It operated entirely on turf-generated steam and was considered a pioneering model of sustainable, locally-powered industry for its time. The Bishop of Galway Michael Browne blessed the factory and encouraged local Catholic women to purchase hats from the factory to wear to mass instead of headscarves.

The factory was part of a broader effort by the Irish government, led by then-Minister for Industry and Commerce Seán Lemass, to attract Jewish refugees with industrial expertise to revitalise Ireland's underdeveloped western counties. Schmolka and Irish Jewish businessman Marcus Witztum, along with other Jewish entrepreneurs from Austria, France, and Czechoslovakia, were granted permission to relocate both personnel and equipment to Ireland. Witztum used the opportunity to helps Jews escape Nazi persecultion. Around thirty Jewish families came to Castlebar during this period, many of whom settled in the Blackfort area on the Newport Road. This neighbourhood became informally known as “Little Jerusalem”.

Following the end of World War II, the Jewish population in Castlebar began to decline. Some families returned to continental Europe, while others moved to Dublin or emigrated elsewhere.

The hat factory continued to operate until the 1980s, remaining a central part of Castlebar’s industrial landscape for over four decades. The Factory provided stable employment for local families and was a major contributor to the town’s post-war economy. The factory produced a range of high-quality felt hats, many of which were exported abroad. During its peak years in the 1940s and 1950s, the factory employed up to 270 workers. The technical expertise of the founders, combined with local labour and raw materials such as turf and wool, made the factory a rare success story in a region otherwise beset by emigration and limited industrial development.

By the 1970s, however, changing fashion trends, global competition, and the decline of the felt hat industry led to a gradual downturn in business. In 1981 the Western Hat Factory closed its doors.

=== 21st century ===
Since the early 1990s, Castlebar has experienced a surge in growth, marked by a sharp rise in population, the construction of new housing estates, and a broadening of its role as the administrative and commercial centre of Mayo. By the late 1990s, commentators were already noting that Castlebar was bucking the wider trend of underdevelopment in the west, thriving at the expense of smaller surrounding towns and villages. The Celtic Tiger economy accelerated this shift. National and local media described Castlebar as one of Ireland’s fastest-growing regional towns. Reports highlighted its transformation from a traditional market centre into a major shopping destination, with the arrival of Aldi, Tesco and Dunnes Stores in the town centre and record retail figures in the early 2000s. The town also attracted significant industrial employers, such as Baxter, Volex (employing 970 people in the town at its peak) and American Power Conversion, while large-scale public investments, including the redevelopment of Castlebar Courthouse and the expansion of educational and healthcare services, reinforced its status as a county hub. The official town boundary was extended in 2001, contributing to the recorded population increase, from 7,648 in 1991 to 11,371 in 2002. The opening of the National Museum of Country Life at nearby Turlough also contributed to the town's upswing.

But after the Great Recession, Castlebar faced significant economic challenges. Major employers such as Volex and American Power Conversion announced large-scale redundancies and eventual closures, dealing heavy blows to its industrial base.

== Coat of arms ==
The name of the town comes from the castle built in about 1235 (see above). This castle is depicted as part of the town's coat of arms, with two yew trees on either side because Castlebar is the county town of Mayo (Irish: Maigh Eo, meaning 'plain of the yew trees'). The crosses represent the parish of Aglish (the official name of the parish of Castlebar). The 1798 'Races of Castlebar' is commemorated by pikes. Underneath are the words 'Ar Aghaidh', meaning 'forward'.

== Demographics ==
Historical population
Year	Pop.	±%
1821	5,404	—
1831	6,373	+17.9%
1841	5,137	−19.4%
1851	4,016	−21.8%
1861	3,022	−24.8%
1871	3,571	+18.2%
1881	3,855	+8.0%
1891	3,558	−7.7%
1901	3,585	+0.8%
1911	3,698	+3.2%
1926	4,266	+15.4%
1936	4,826	+13.1%
1946	4,951	+2.6%
1951	5,288	+6.8%
1956	5,321	+0.6%
1961	5,852	+10.0%
1966	6,292	+7.5%
1971	6,476	+2.9%
1981	7,423	+14.6%
1986	7,645	+3.0%
1991	7,648	+0.0%
1996	8,532	+11.6%
2002	11,371	+33.3%
2006	11,891	+4.6%
2011	12,318	+3.6%
2016	12,068	−2.0%
2022	13,054	+8.2%

Castlebar has experienced significant demographic changes over the past two centuries, with population figures showing notable fluctuations from 5,404 in 1821 to a low of 3,022 in 1861 in the wake of the Great Irish famine. There was a gradual recovery in the late 19th and early 20th centuries. After steady but modest growth for much of the 20th century, Castlebar expanded rapidly during the 1980s, 1990s, and 2000s. The population grew by one-third in the six years between the 1996 and 2002 census, reflecting a broader trend of urbanisation and economic development in Ireland during the Celtic Tiger period. According to the 2016 census, the town's population reached 12,068, representing a threefold increase from the 1926 figure of 4,256. By 2022, this figure had risen again to 13,054, marking Castlebar's continuing role as a key urban centre in County Mayo.

== Culture ==
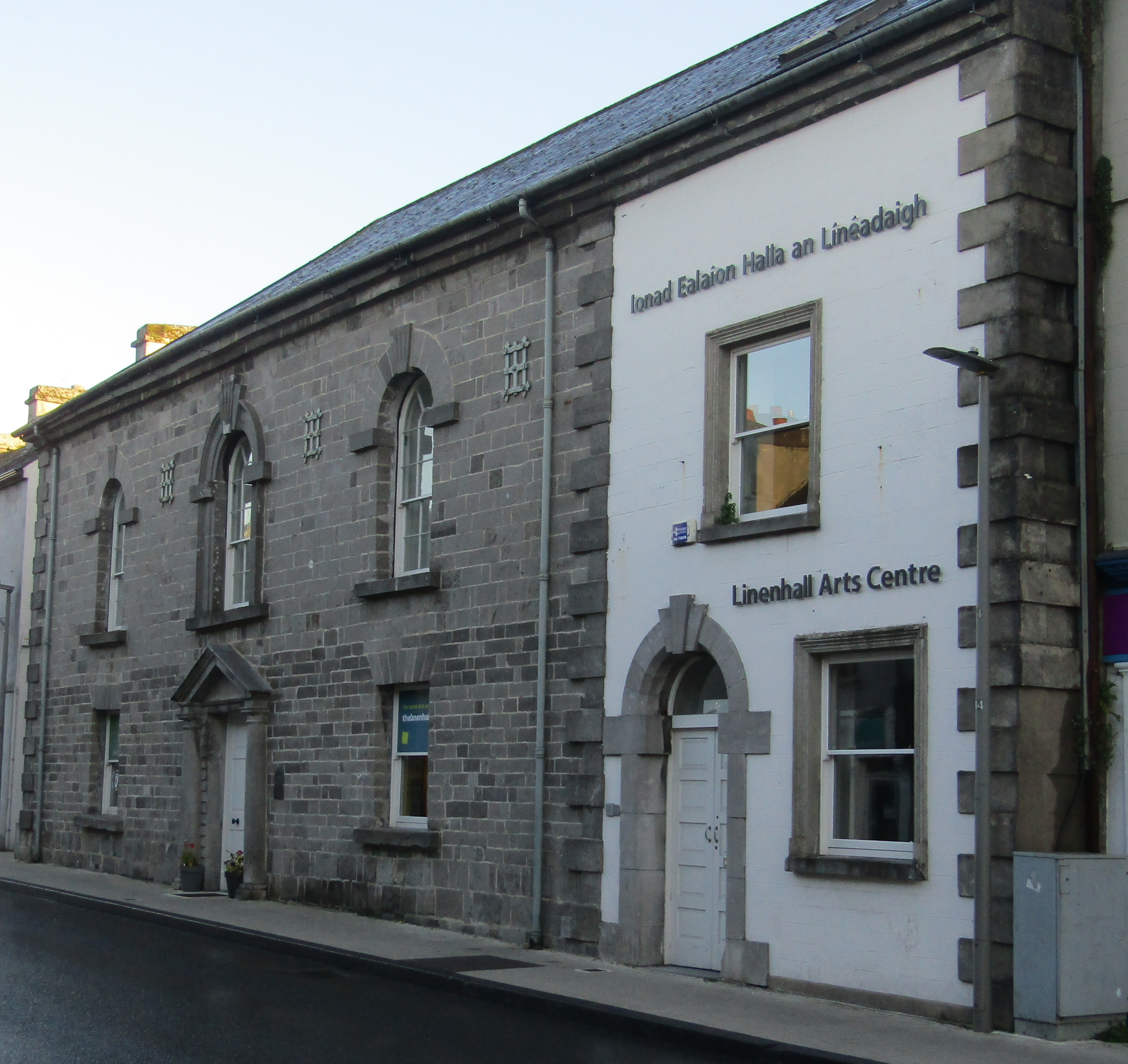
Linenhall Arts Centre

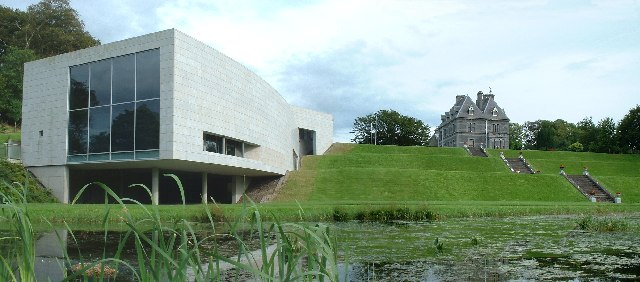
Museum of Country Life

The town hosts a number of festivals and traditions, including the International Four Days' Walk. A well-established blues music festival in venues across the town took place for many years on the weekend before the first Monday in June, but has not taken place since 2011. During the 1970s and 1980s the town hosted the International Castlebar Song Contest, televised nationally on RTÉ. In 1981 and 1982, Castlebar hosted the Occasion at the Castle music festival.

The Museum of Country Life is on Castlebar's outskirts, and is the only branch of the National Museum of Ireland outside Dublin.

Castlebar is home to the Linenhall Arts Centre, which exhibits visual art and hosts live drama and music performances. The Royal Theatre and Event Centre has a capacity of 2,200 people fully seated or 4,000 standing. It hosts larger-scale productions and popular music concerts.

== Religion ==
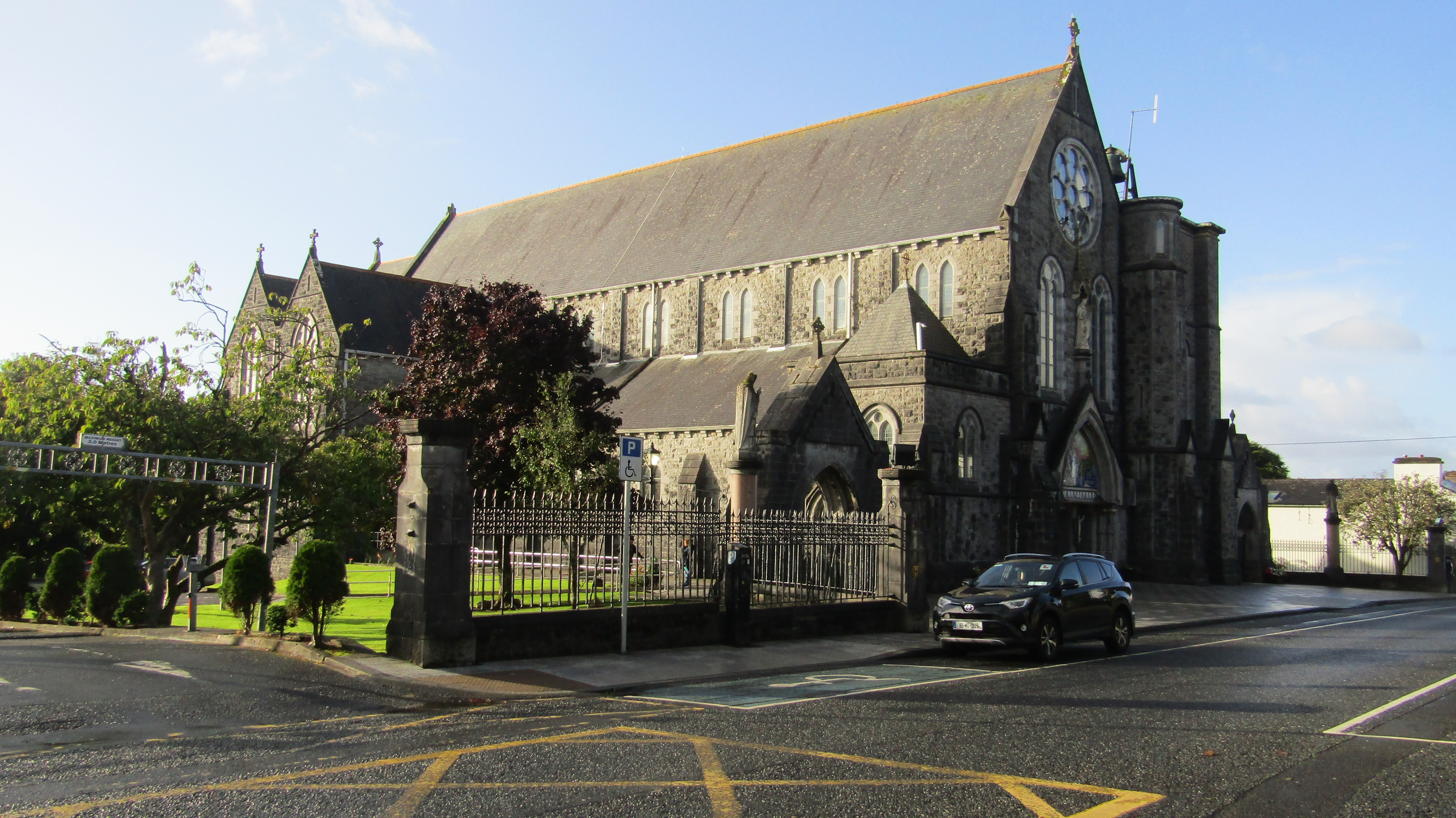
Church of the Holy Rosary, the main Catholic Church in Castlebar

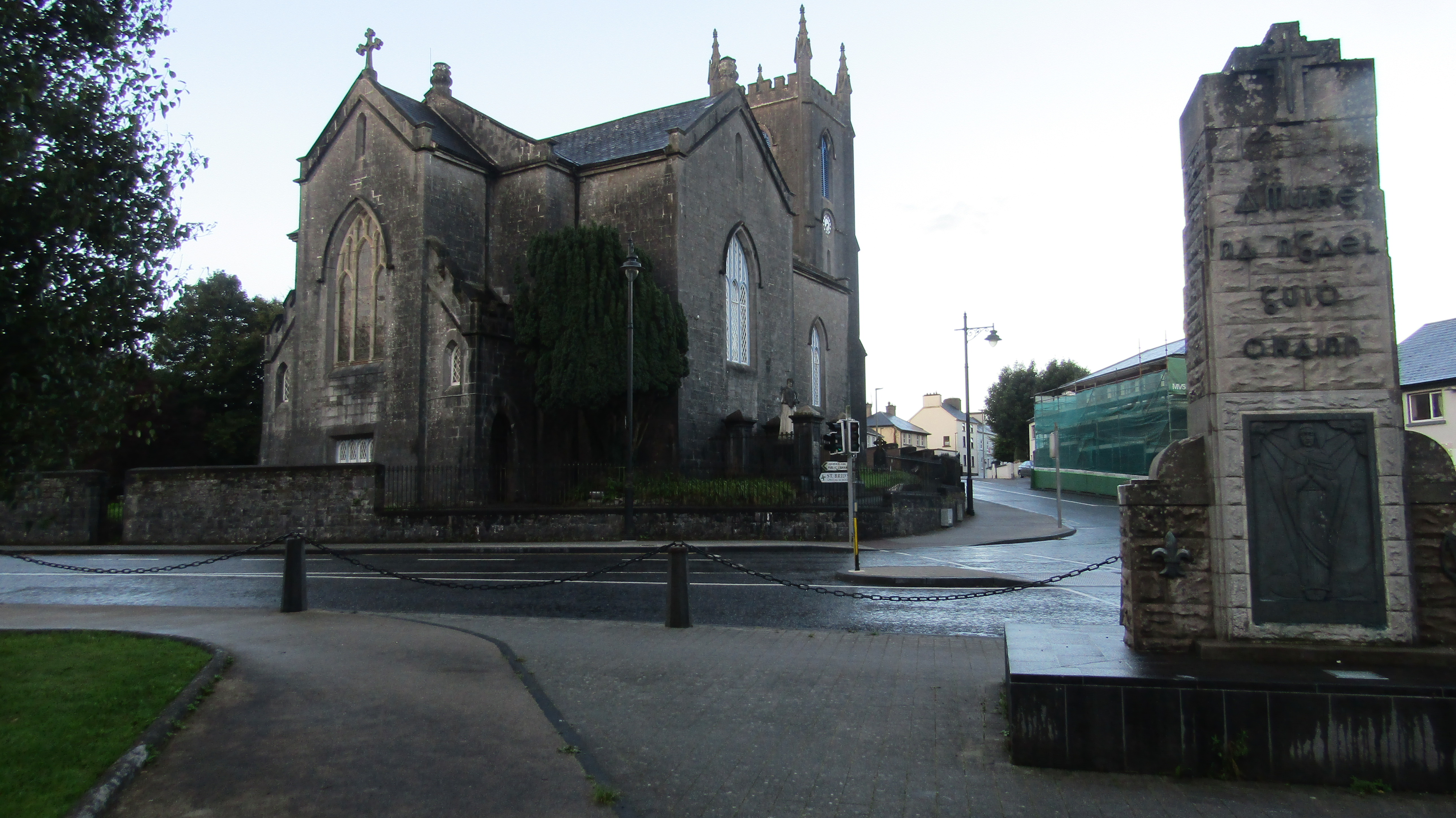
Christchurch was constructed in the 1820s to provide services for followers of the Church of Ireland.

Christianity in the Castlebar area dates to the early Middle Ages, represented by the ecclesiastical site at nearby Turlough, where a monastery was founded around the 6th century and a round tower was built in the 9th or 10th century. By the 17th century, Castlebar had developed into a garrison and market town, with the protestant Church of Ireland established by the British as the official state church. A parish church existed on the site of today's Christ Church by the early 18th century, and the present structure was completed in the late 1820s. The 19th century also saw the arrival of Methodist and other Protestant chapels in the region.

Restrictions on worship eased after Catholic Emancipation in 1829. An early parish church, built around 1819 by public subscription, served local Catholics until plans for a larger church were developed in the 1860s under Canon James McGee. Archbishop John MacHale laid the foundation stone in 1872, but after McGee's death and disputes within the church hierarchy, construction stalled for over two decades. In the 1890s, Canon Lyons abandoned the incomplete "McHale church" and commissioned a new design by architect Walter G. Doolin, a decision that provoked major local controversy before work finally began in 1897. The Church of the Holy Rosary was completed and dedicated on Rosary Sunday, 7 October 1901, with contributions from emigrants in the United States and craftsmanship from both Irish and European workshops. This church, along with schools and convents run by religious orders, reestablished Catholicism as the dominant denomination in Castlebar in the 20th century. Renovations and additions, including new windows, mosaics, and reconfiguration after the Second Vatican Council, marked its 100-year anniversary in 2001.

Calvary Church, part of the non-denominational evangelical Calvary Mission network, opened a permanent meeting place in the town centre in 2024 after several years of development. In 2023, the Castlebar Islamic Centre opened in the Moneenbradagh area to provide a place of worship and community space for the local Muslim population.

== Economy ==
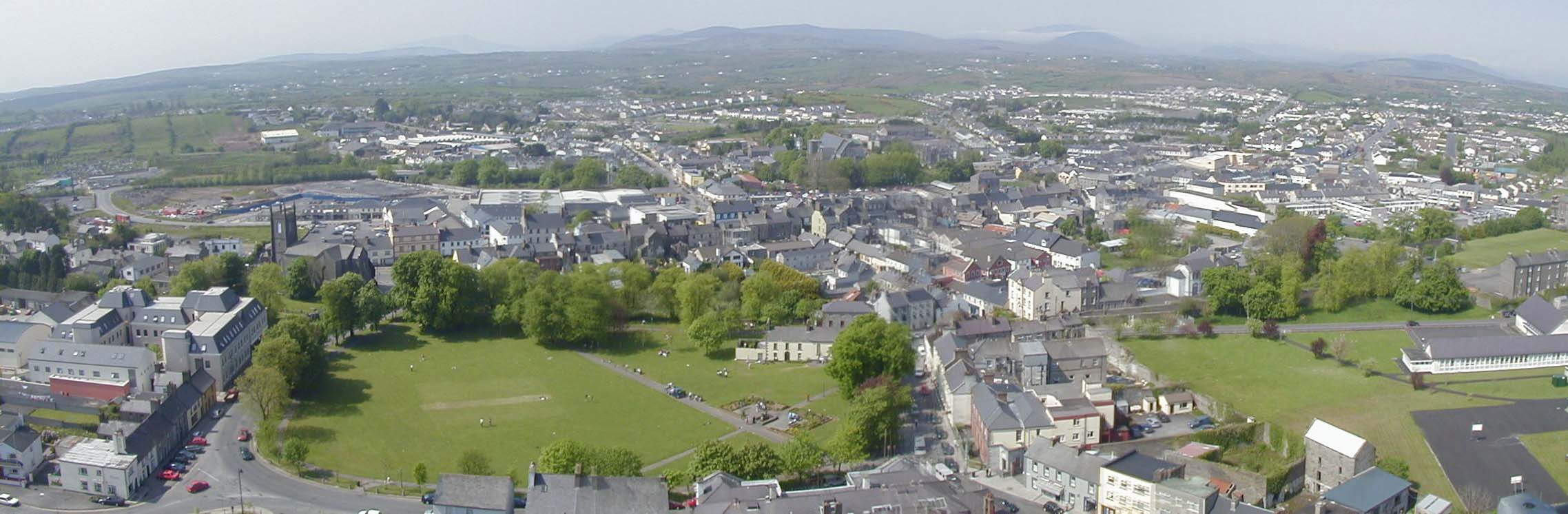
Aerial view of Castlebar

Castlebar is home to the health care company Baxter Healthcare and manufacturer Fort Wayne Metals. As of 2022, Baxter employs about 1,200 people in the Castlebar area. In 2024, PanelDuct, a ventilation systems company, announced it would lease the former Volex factory building from its current owners, Mayo County Council. As of 2024, PanelDuct employs 70 people locally. PanelDuct has said it has invested €3.4 million into the facility since 2020 and will have the option to buy the building at a reduced commercial rate by the end of 2025.

== Transport ==
=== Road ===
Castlebar is served by the N5 national primary road and the N60 and N84 national secondary roads. In 1990 a relief road was built around Castlebar, removing through traffic on the N5 from the main street. This road is a basic two-lane road. It suffers from chronic congestion, particularly in the summer months when thousands of tourists have to negotiate the bottleneck en route to neighbouring Westport and Achill Island. A bypass of Castlebar of dual-carriageway standard was approved by An Bórd Pleanala in July 2014, and construction began in late 2019. It was completed in 2023.

=== Rail ===
Castlebar railway station is a station on the Dublin to Westport service. Passengers can travel to Ballina and Foxford by travelling to Manulla Junction and changing trains. The station opened on 17 December 1862.

=== Old airport ===
Castlebar used to have a commercial airport; the site where it once stood is now occupied by Castlebar Retail Park. The airport's IATA code was CLB and its ICAO code was EICB.

== Education ==
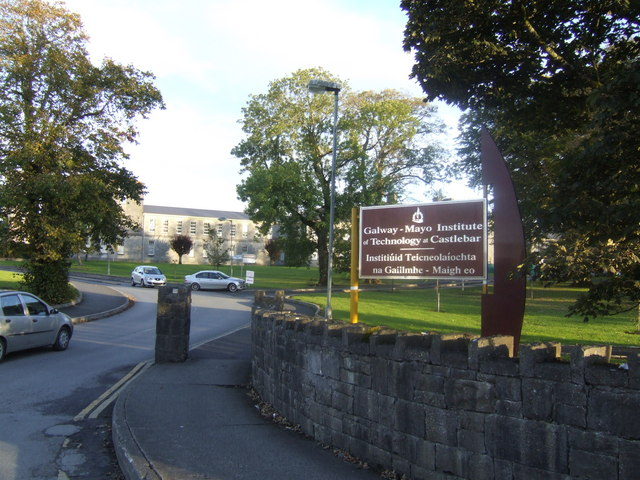
Atlantic TU campus in Castlebar

In addition to a number of national (primary) schools, Castlebar's secondary schools include St Gerald's College (a De La Salle boys school), St Joseph's Secondary School (a girls school), and Davitt College (a mixed vocational school).

Third level and further education colleges in the town include Atlantic TU's Mayo campus (formerly Galway-Mayo Institute of Technology), the Mayo, Sligo & Leitrim Education and Training Board, and Castlebar College of Further Education.

== Sport ==
=== GAA ===
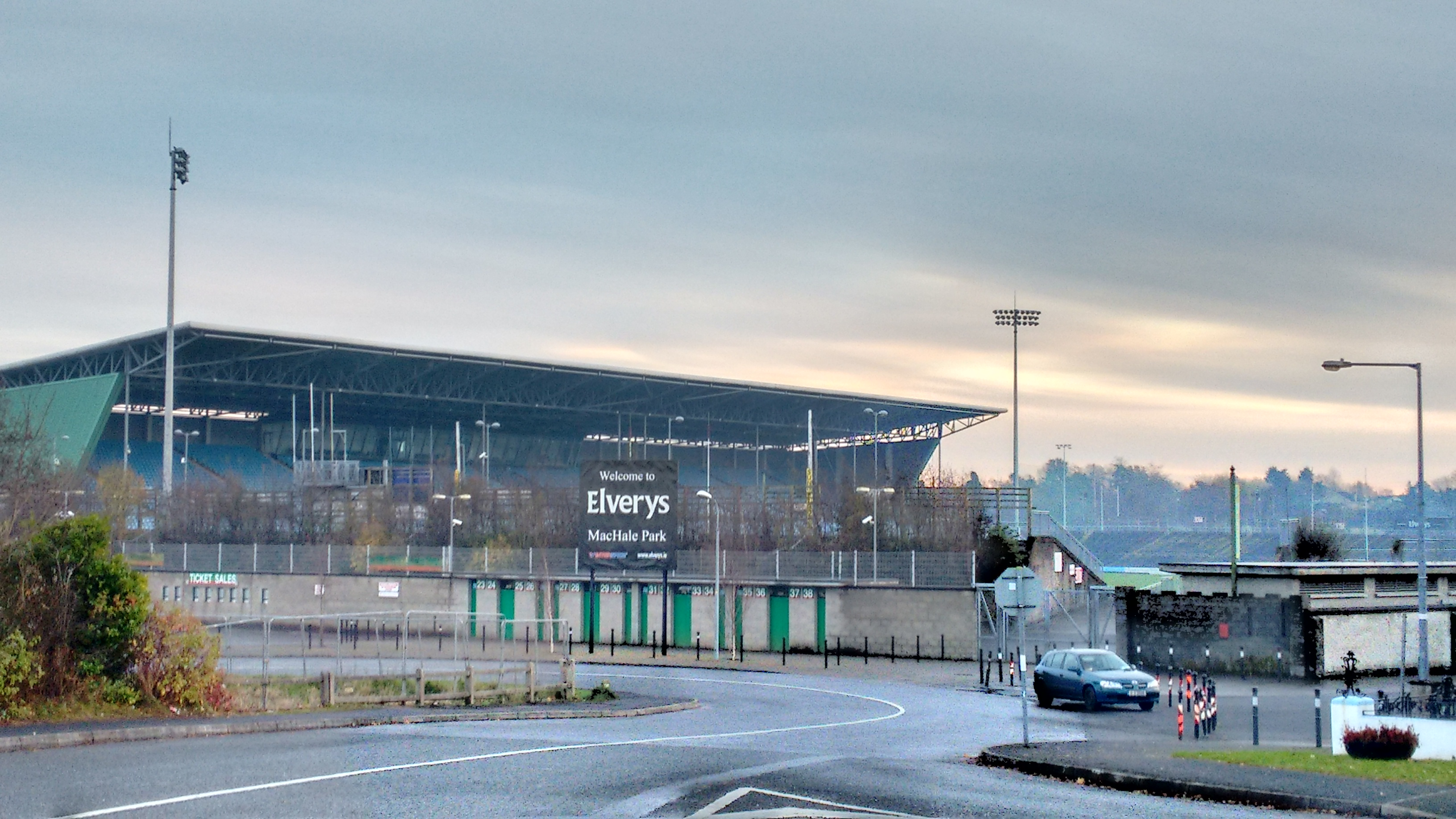
MacHale Park

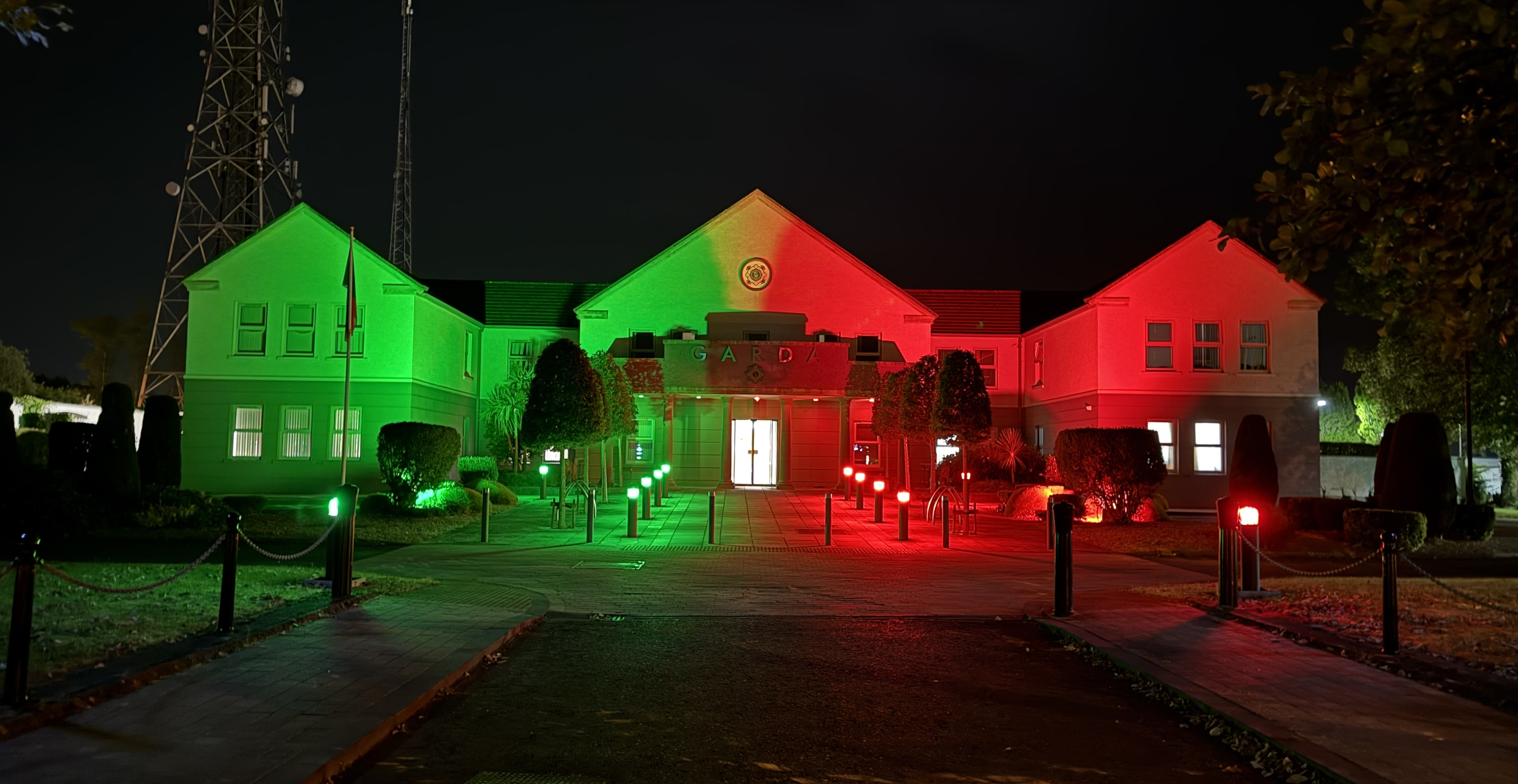
Castlebar Garda station illuminated in the Mayo colours after the 2026 All-Ireland Football championship win.

The local Gaelic football and hurling team is the Castlebar Mitchels GAA club. Throughout its history, the club has won over 30 Mayo Senior Football Championship titles and two Mayo Senior Hurling Championship titles. The club reached the All-Ireland Senior Club Football Championship final in 2014 and 2016. Other nearby GAA clubs include Breaffy GAA, Parke GAA, Islandeady GAA and Ballyvary Hurling Club.

MacHale Park in Castlebar is one of the larger GAA grounds in Ireland, with a capacity of approximately 28,000. In the early 21st century, the Mayo county board oversaw the building of a new stand with dressing rooms and offices underneath.

=== Soccer ===
Local soccer teams include Castlebar Celtic F.C., which was established in 1924. As of 2014, it had a team playing in the Mayo Super League and a senior women's side playing in the Continental Women's National League. There is also a youth program which provides teams from under 10s to under 18s for boys and under 14 to under 17 for girls, as well as an under 8 academy. They play their home games in Celtic Park, in the centre of the town. Castlebar Town FC were formed in the 1970s (as Castlebar United) as an alternative to Celtic. Other local teams include Snugboro United, Ballyheane FC, Manulla FC and Ballyvary Blue Bombers.

In 2023, Mayo FC was founded, in the hopes of bringing League of Ireland soccer to County Mayo. Based in Castlebar, the club plays its home matches at Umbro Park, a regional facility that has hosted inter-league and international underage fixtures.

=== Rugby ===
Castlebar RFC, a rugby union club and one of the original founding members of the Connacht branch of the IRFU in 1885, reformed 1928 and again revived in the 1970s. Its grounds are located at Cloondeash on the outskirts of the town, with two pitches and a club house. The club, which plays in a navy and light blue strip, participates in provincial (Connacht Junior League Div.1B) and national league competitions. Castlebar won the Cawley Cup in 2009 and reached the final in 2017. The ladies team, which was formed in 2012, won the Connacht Development League Final in November 2013.

=== Other sports ===
There is an 18-hole golf club in the town, as well as athletics, basketball, racquetball, tennis and other clubs. The council provides an indoor heated swimming pool and there are numerous gyms.

There are also several martial arts clubs in the area, and Castlebar hosted the WOMAA World Martial Games in both 2007 and 2008.

== Notable people ==
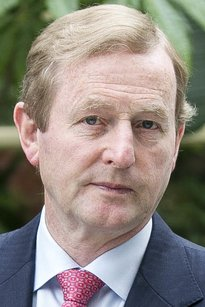
Enda Kenny, former Taoiseach (2011–2017)

- Ulick Bourke (1829–1877), scholar; founder of the Gaelic Union
- Enoch Burke, former teacher
- Louis Brennan (1852–1932), inventor
- Margaret Burke-Sheridan (1889–1958), opera singer
- Pádraig Carney (1928–2019), a Gaelic footballer who was known as the "Flying Doctor"
- Michael Feeney, chairman and founder of Mayo Peace Park Garden
- Pádraig Flynn (born 1939), former government minister and European Commissioner
- Charles Haughey (1925–2006), former Taoiseach
- John Hennen FRSE (1779–1828), military surgeon
- Enda Kenny (born 1951), former Taoiseach
- Mark Mellett (born 1958), former Chief of Staff of the Irish Defence Forces
- John MacHale (1789–1881), Archbishop of Tuam, Irish independence leader
- Ernie O'Malley (1897–1957), prominent officer in the Irish Republican Army during the Irish War of Independence and on the anti-Treaty side in the Irish Civil War; also a writer
- Patrick J. Rogers (1844–1897), American lawyer and politician
- Sally Rooney (born 1991), novelist and screenwriter
- William Joyce Sewell (1835–1901), Unionist colonel during the American Civil War, US senator from New Jersey

== Twin towns – sister cities ==
Castlebar has entered into twinning arrangements with:

- Dixon, United States
- Höchstadt an der Aisch, Germany
- Peekskill, United States
- Ballymena, Northern Ireland

== See also ==
- List of towns and villages in Ireland
- Murders of Jack and Tommy Blaine
