= Turlough, County Mayo =

Turlough Turlach
- Village
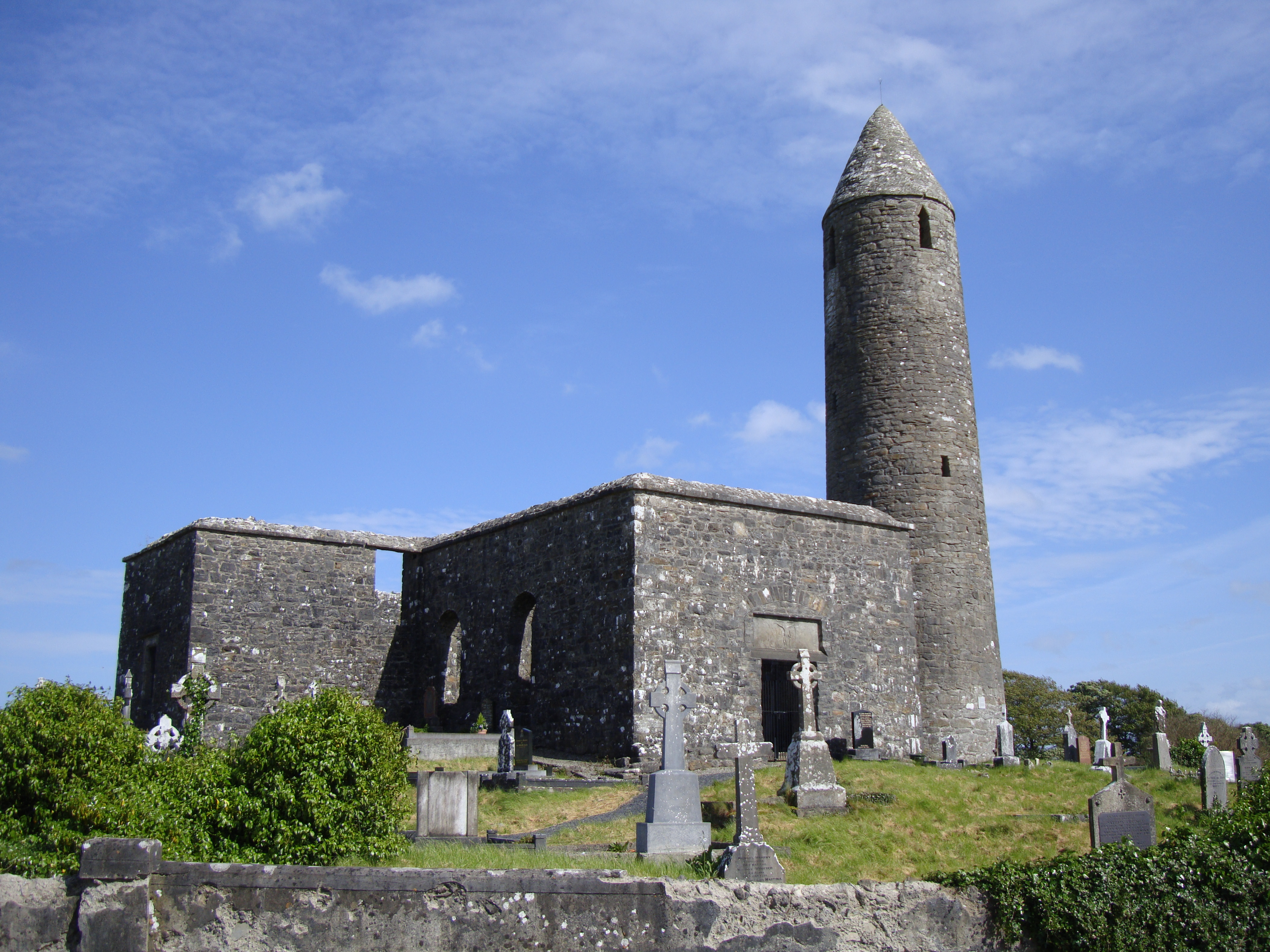
- Round tower and church at Turlough

- Location in Ireland
- Coordinates: 53.8833333°N 9.2166667°W
- Country: Ireland
- Province: Connacht
- County: County Mayo
- Elevation: 28 m (92 ft)

Population (2016)
  - Total: 299

Turlough, (Irish: Turlach, from tuar lach, meaning 'dry place': in particular, a seasonal lake) is a village in County Mayo, Ireland, 6 km northeast of Castlebar. It is known for the presence of the Museum of Country Life (part of the National Museum of Ireland), and for its well-preserved and unusually squat round tower, built between 900 and 1200.

Turlough is also the name of the encompassing civil parish and the surrounding 241-acre townland. The village lies along the Castlebar River (Irish: An tSiúir) just off the N5 road, and the countryside around the village is scattered with standing stones, a holy well, fulachtaí fia, and cillíní.

== FitzGerald family ==
In the eighteenth century it was the home of a branch of the FitzGerald family, distant cousins to the Earl of Desmond. The most celebrated member of the family was the notably eccentric George Robert FitzGerald, nicknamed "Fighting FitzGerald". Having spent most of his short life gambling and duelling, he was hanged for conspiracy to murder his father's attorney in 1786.

== Facilities ==
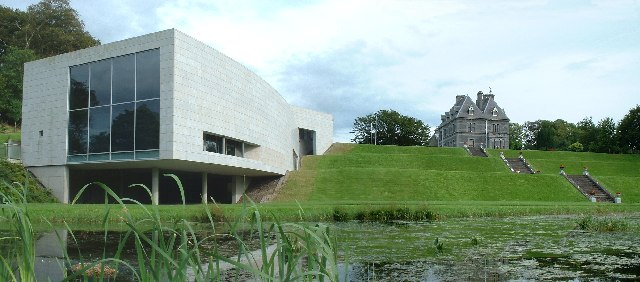
Country Life Museum

Turlough's facilities include a pub ('The Turlough Inn'), a shop, a hair salon, and a lifestyle and garden centre with a restaurant a short distance away. Turlough is also home to a branch of the National Museum of Ireland, the 'Museum of Country Life'.

== See also ==
- Turlock, California
