= Ballyconnell, County Kerry =

Ballyconnell Irish: Baile Uí Chonaill
- Townland
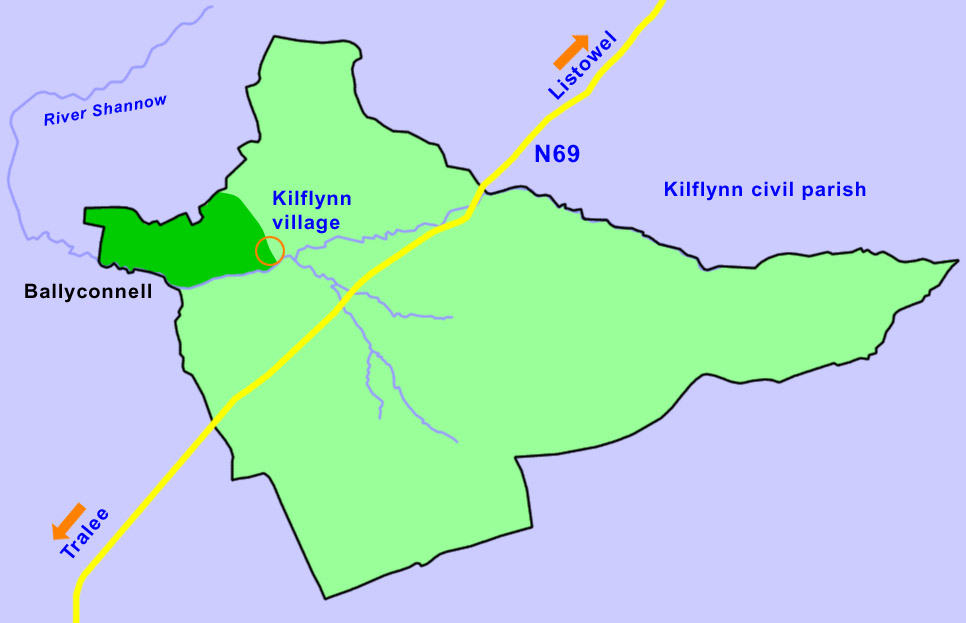

- Ballyconnell shown within Ireland
- Coordinates: 52°21′05″N 9°38′23″W
- Country: Ireland
- County: County Kerry
- Barony: Clanmaurice
- Civil parish: Kilflynn

Ballyconnell, (Irish:Baile Uí Chonaill ) is a townland of County Kerry, Ireland.

It is one of the sixteen ancient townlands of the civil parish of Kilflynn and is also the most westerly. Its southern border is formed by the river Shannow, its eastern by the Castletown road to Kilflynn Village, and the land is traversed by the Ballyconnell road from Kilflynn to the R557 Abbeydorney road. The area covers 146.5 hectares (362 acres) of rural land.

== History ==
Ballyconnell contains five archaeological sites recognised as National Monuments: four are locations of ancient ringforts (Universal Transverse Mercator coordinate system (UTM) grid references: 29U 457409 5800207, 29U 48650 623438, 29U 488694 623797, and 29U 488718 623375) and one is the site of the church of 'St. Flann' (about whom nothing is known [no such person was canonised]) which the former Church of Ireland structure was built on, and which is now St. Columba's Heritage Centre and Museum, the latter protected as part of the National Inventory of Architectural Heritage (UTM grid reference: 29U 489268 623296).

Thomas Stack, of the Stack family which had its seat at Crotta, owned Ballyconnell amongst other townlands. Because of their support for the Irish Rebellion of 1641 and the Catholic Confederation the Stacks' land was confiscated following the Act for the Settlement of Ireland in 1652. After the Act of Settlement of 1662, Ballyconnell was given to Henry Ponsonby in 1666. Ponsonby was a soldier, the brother of a colonel in Oliver Cromwell's New Model Army and one of thousands of soldiers rewarded with Irish land.

== Representation ==
Ballyconnell is in the Roman Catholic parish of Abbeydorney, whose priest is the Very Reverend Denis O’Mahony.

The townland is in the parliamentary constituency of Kerry (since 2016), returning five Teachtaí Dála (TDs) to Dáil Éireann.

== See also ==
- Civil parishes in Ireland
- Kilflynn
