= Gortclohy, County Kerry =

Gortclohy Irish: Gort Cloiche
- townland
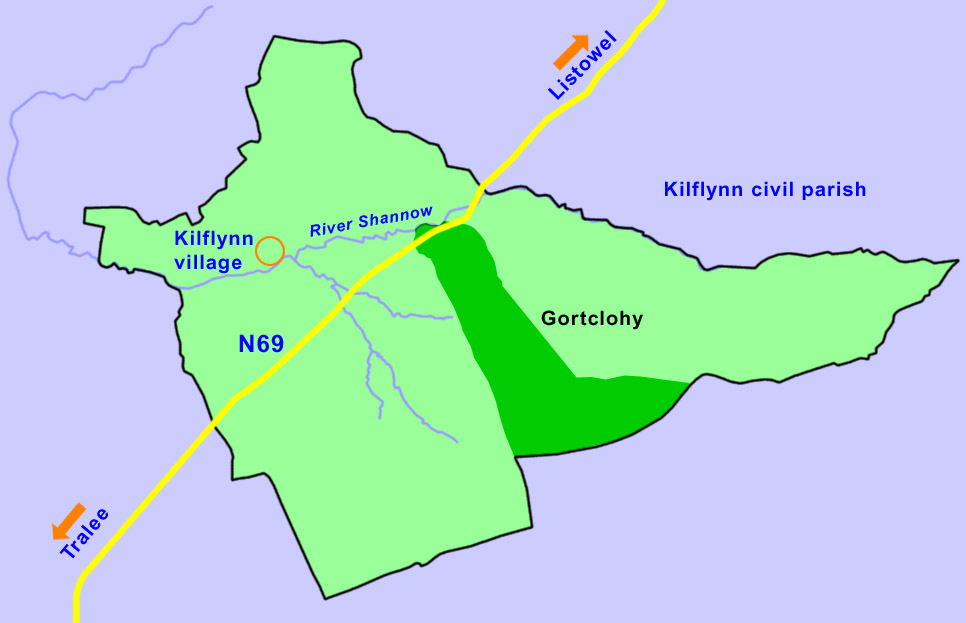

- Gortclohy shown within Ireland
- Country: Ireland
- County: County Kerry
- Barony: Clanmaurice
- Civil parish: Kilflynn

Area
  - Total: 306.28 ha (756.8 acres)

Gortclohy (Irish: Gort Cloiche) is a townland of County Kerry, Ireland.

It is one of sixteen ancient townlands of the civil parish of Kilflynn and lies centrally in the parish. It touches the River Shannow by the Waterfall, and the northern tip is just clipped by the N69 Tralee-Listowel road. It is largely rural and partly forested.

== Archaeology and history ==
The name is noted in Ordnance Survey parish namebooks as meaning 'field of the stones'. Examples of anglicised spellings are Gurtclughy, Gurtcloughy, Gurtclogha, Gurtcloohy.

In 2011, archaeologists dug a test trench on the site of the realignment of the N69 Tralee-Listowel road, which passes through Gortclohy, evidence of Bronze Age Continental European Beaker culture was found, namely tool production waste and charcoal of hazel, oak and alder (approximate location using Universal Transverse Mercator coordinate system, 29U 491373 623604). A fragment of alder charcoal was carbon-dated to between 2132 and 1920 B.C. This is the most northerly evidence of Beaker culture in County Kerry and the earliest evidence of human activity so far in the parish of Kilflynn. Evidence of later human activity was found in two trenches dug on the same N69 route at Cloonnafinneela.

The townland was formerly the property of James Stack, of the Stack family well-known to the area, reflected in the townland name of Stack's Mountain adjacent to Gortclohy. He supported the Irish Rebellion of 1641 and the Confederation of Kilkenny in the Irish Confederate Wars. This resulted in his land being taken by Cromwell's forces following the Act for the Settlement of Ireland in 1652. In 1666, Henry Ponsonby, a 46-year-old former soldier who fought for Cromwell, was granted the land after the Act of Settlement of 1662.

Timothy Tuomey of Gortclohy was a victim of the Ballyseedy incident during the Irish Civil War. On 7 March 1923, Tuomey and eight other Republican prisoners of the Free State army were taken from the barracks in Tralee to Ballyseedy, where a mine had been prepared by two Dublin Guard officers. In addition to Tuomey, two other prisoners from the Kilflynn civil parish were present, Stephen Fuller (later to be Teachta Dála for North Kerry) and George O'Shea; all had been fighting with the Kilflynn Flying Column. The nine were tied in a standing circle with their backs to the mine which was then remotely detonated. Bombs and bullets followed. The only survivor was Fuller. Tuomey and O'Shea are buried in the Republican plot in Kilflynn.

== Representation ==
Gortclohy is in the Roman Catholic parish of Abbeydorney, whose priest is the Very Reverend Denis O’Mahony.

The townland is in the parliamentary constituency of Kerry (since 2016), returning five Teachtaí Dála (TDs) to the Dáil Éireann. The current TDs are John Brassil (Fianna Fáil), Martin Ferris (Sinn Féin), Brendan Griffin (Fine Gael), Danny Healy-Rae (Independent) and Michael Healy-Rae (Independent).

== See also ==
- Kilflynn
- Civil parishes in Ireland
