= Kilflynn =

Village in County Kerry, Ireland

Kilflynn Irish: Cill Flainn
- Village
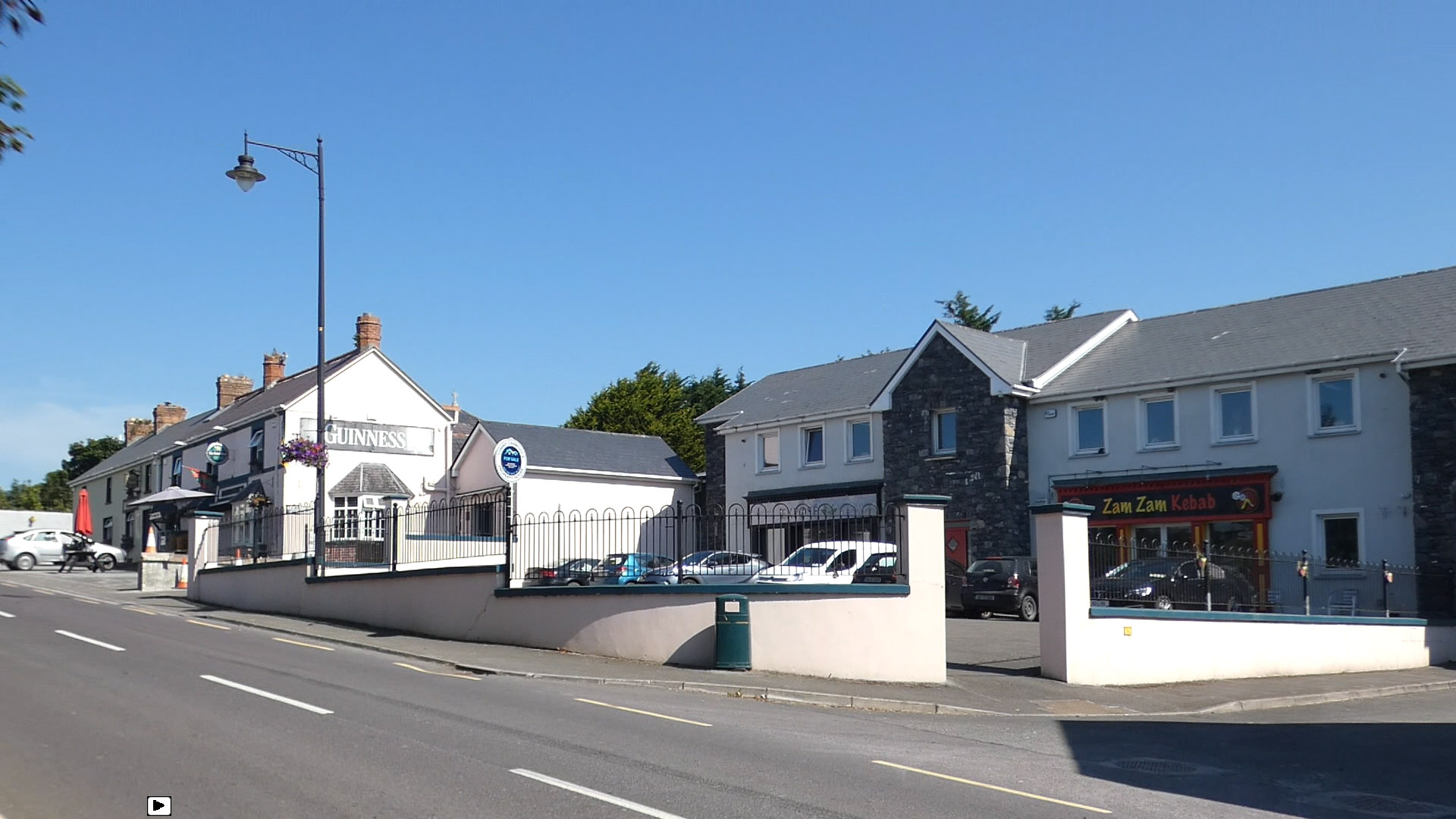

- Location in Ireland
- Coordinates: 52°21′02″N 9°37′31″W
- Country: Ireland
- Province: Munster
- County: County Kerry

Population (2022)
  - Total: 144
- Time zone: UTC+0 (WET)
  - Summer (DST): UTC-1 (IST (WEST))
- Irish Grid Reference: Q895239

Kilflynn (Irish: Cill Flainn) is a village and a civil parish in north County Kerry, Ireland. It is 11 km north-east of Tralee just off the N69 road from Tralee to Listowel.

== Etymology ==
The origin of the place name Cill Flainn is unknown. Two suggestions are commonly circulated. ‘Cill’ in Irish can mean 'cell' or 'churchyard' so in context might mean 'church of Flainn.' A popularised tale is that it was named after a Roman Catholic hermit monk, Flainn, said to have lived by the River Shannow (which runs through Kilflynn). Crippled and blind, he was visited by the Virgin Mary, who offered to restore his ailing sight. Flainn declined, asking for the miraculous power to be transferred to others via a local well (now Tobar Flainn, well or spring of Flainn). Some refer to this person as ‘St Flainn,’ but no such person was canonised. There is possible confusion with St Flannan, originally from Killaloe in County Clare. The alternative suggestion is that the name derives from the 'O’Flannan tribe': in August 1931, in the Proceedings of the Royal Irish Academy, a paper referencing a 15th-century manuscript (itself said to be a copy of a 12th-century document) listing rents in Clanmaurice presents both 'O Flannayn' and 'Kyllflanyn' as 'Kilflyn' in the English translation from the original Latin, a significant error which may be the root of the suggestion. The cantred (cf. Welsh cantref or English hundred) or rural deanery of Othorna & Oflannan (Irish Uí Thorna & Uí Flannáin) was an Anglo-Norman sub-division, in this case generally along the historical boundaries of much older kingdoms and regions which were part of West Munster (Irish Iarmuman or Iar Mbumba), in the realm of the Ciarraighe, and which later became County Kerry some time between 1222 and 1229.

Different anglicised spellings appeared over the years. In William Petty's Down Survey of Ireland (1655-1656) the parish appears as 'Kilfloinie Parish'. Charles Smith wrote it as 'Kilflin' in 1756, as did William Wilson 30 years later. In Taylor and Skinner's road maps of 1777 it is spelt 'Kilftyn', likely a transcription error.

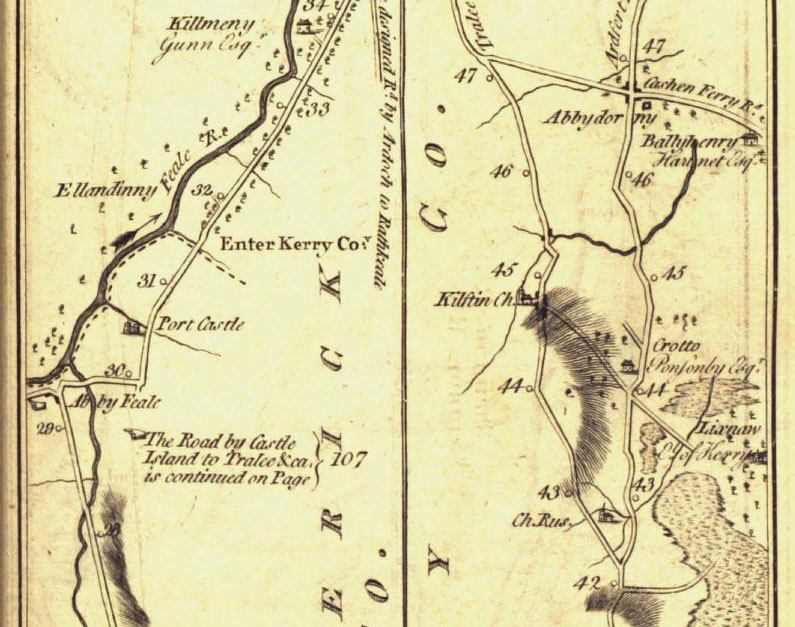
A detail from Taylor and Skinner's book of 1777 showing the road from Tralee to Listowel. Kilflynn ('Kilftyn'), Abbeydorney ('Abbydorney'), Lixnaw and Crotto (seat of the Ponsonby family at the time) are clearly shown.

Samuel Lewis wrote it 'Kilflyn' in 1840 and this spelling is extant in places like official Ordnance Survey Ireland maps or on new road signs (particularly the one on Shanow Bridge near Abbeydorney). Locally, and in most documentation, it is spelt Kilflynn.

== Geography ==
The village lies in the southern part of the Listowel or Kerry plain. The rocks underlying the village area are typically Namurian sandstone and shale which formed between 326 and 313 million years ago during the Carboniferous period and cover 27% of County Kerry. The centre of Kilflynn is actually on the edge of this area.

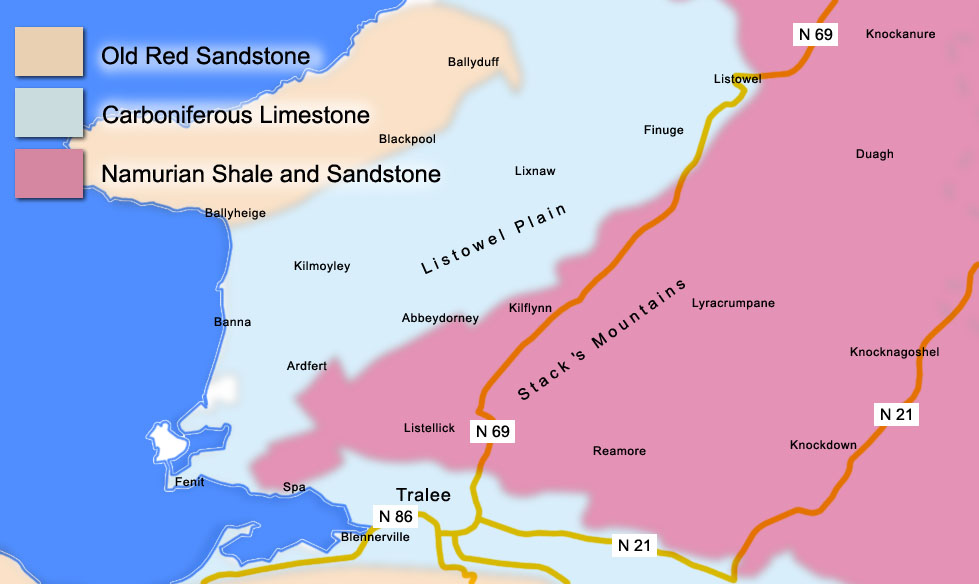
The basic bedrock of North Kerry centred on Kilflynn. The bedrock contours were adapted from the Geological Survey of Ireland 1:1 000 000 scale map, 2003

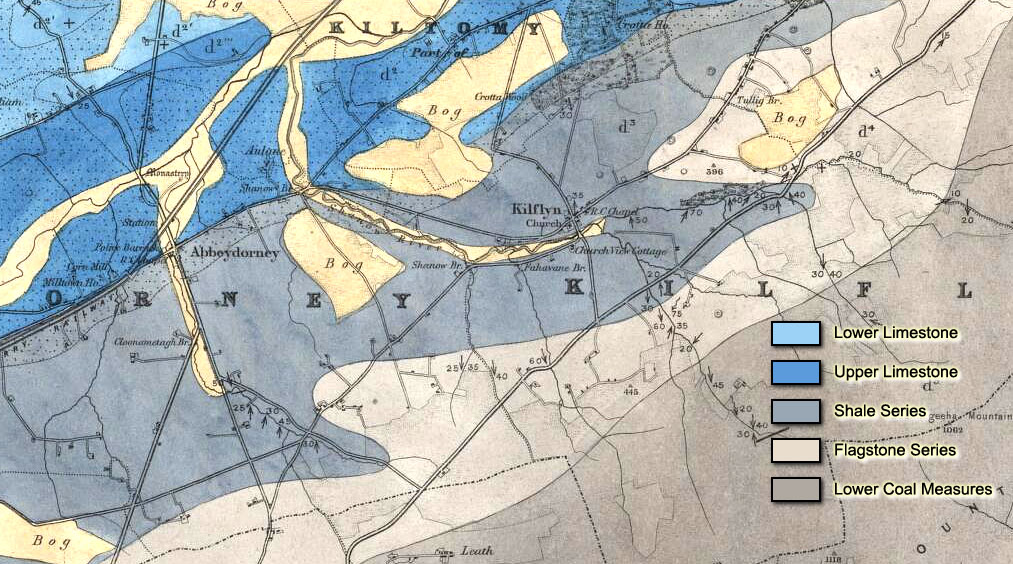
More detailed bedrock, from sheet 162 (Tralee) centred on Kilflynn, from the 1:63 620 scale Geological Survey of Ireland map of 1883, surveyed by Frederick J. Foot; key adapted from original.

Immediately to the north and west the bedrock is limestone (later to be sourced from nearby Lixnaw and Abbeydorney for use in lime kilns). These rocks, as part of the Western Irish Namurian Basin (or Clare Basin) were formed in a sub-equatorial tropical environment, due to the deposition of fine particles in a delta, likely from a river flow to the south-west on a continental mass formed from what are now North America, Eastern Europe, Western Europe and Africa. This area is thus part of the Iapetus Suture, that is a region where the ancient Iapetus Ocean closed up. The Atlantic Ocean had yet to form.

The area was subject to glaciation during the ice ages. The glacial meltwater evidence coincides with an area to the south and east of Kilflynn and the N26 road, broadly in line with the edge of the hills facing the north-west. The ice sheet that covered Ireland split about 19,000 years ago, along a corridor that included the area where Kilflynn lies and going down past Banna Strand (the sea level was lower then) towards the Atlantic. The main ice sheet retreated northwards, separated from the Kerry-Cork ice cap to the south which disappeared approximately 1000 years later.

Kilflynn centre is currently 59m above sea-level, but the village elevation is between 45 and 70m. Its latitude and longitude are 52.3505 and -9.6253 respectively (52° 21' 2 N, 9° 37' 31 W). As with most of the West of Ireland, the weather of the area is strongly affected by the North Atlantic drift and the prevailing south-westerly winds. Being 10 km inland and well beyond the hills to the south-west, Kilflynn is somewhat sheltered from extremes of wind speed and precipitation experienced largely in the south and west of County Kerry. The average monthly rainfall (full years from 1981 to 2020) is 98mm, with an average of 20 days per month registering rain (>0.1mm) and 15 wet days per month (>1.0mm), with the wettest months usually between October and January. The average daily maximum temperature is 14 °C and the average daily minimum temperature is 7 °C. Summer and winter temperatures (between 2009 and 2021) are 16 °C and 6 °C respectively. For agriculture and horticulture, the last spring air frost is typically in late March or April, that is to say about five to six weeks later than coastal areas (on exposed land). This is still favourable compared to areas further inland. The agricultural land surrounding the village is regarded as good and mostly unspoilt.

Surface spring water was used until the late 1970s for drinking in some surrounding areas. The regional bedrock aquifers for the purposes of drinking water are regarded as locally important and moderately productive, used where there was no water main connection. In the limestone areas to the north, the aquifers are regionally important. The River Shannow, which runs through Kilflynn, emanates from the hills south-west of the N69 from Tooreen to Stacks Mountain townlands and is a tributary of the River Brick, which in turn joins the River Feale, entering the Atlantic south of Ballybunion. Up until the 1980s, there were eels and fish such as brown trout to be found in the river up at least as far as the Waterfall (where the N69 crosses), with birdlife such as various types of finch, dippers and what are locally called 'cranes' (grey herons, which were caught and eaten historically). Since then, the river life has been affected by pollution.

Kerry County Council, which expects a modest increase in population, has made plans for updated local water treatment, improvements for pedestrians and cyclists, and supporting repopulation with associated services, also commenting on Kilflynn as a choice for commuters [into Tralee and Listowel] while impressing the need to retain its peaceful character.

== History until 1900 ==
The first known human presence in Ireland after the last ice age has been determined as c.10,500 years B.C.

When the original Celts of Ireland actually arrived is unknown, with suggestions having been made of between 100 and 5000 years B.C. from linguistic and other evidence. The late Neolithic Beaker folk introduced their cultural advances possibly from the Low Countries or from Iberia; this resulted in key changes and Irish becoming a unique Celtic language. Recent evidence shows a huge number of Irish men have the R1b DNA marker with similarly high percentages also found in other modern Celtic areas on the European Atlantic coast, including the Basque region. The first known farmers in Ireland or Britain landed in Kerry c.4350 B.C. but the incidence of their DNA markers is now very scarce, the R1b marker replacing it c.2500 B.C. This coincides well with the arrival of a dominant Beaker culture, including the introduction of copper mining and metallurgy in Kerry.

In 2011, archaeologists working on the site of the realignment of the N69 Tralee-Listowel road found evidence for early Bronze Age and mediaeval activity in the townlands of Gortclohy and Cloonnafinneela. The Gortclohy dig provided evidence for tool usage from the Beaker period; alder charcoal from the site was carbon-dated to between 2132 and 1920 B.C. This is the most northerly evidence for the Beaker folk in County Kerry. The first Cloonnafinneela dig provided evidence of early mediaeval iron-working, with oak and alder charcoal carbon-dated to between 432 and 595 A.D. and further evidence of pit-kiln charcoal production 200–300 years later. A second dig at Cloonafinneela gave up evidence of various plants as burnt roofing thatch including rushes, cereals, hazel, oak and willow charcoal, the hazel dated to between 1450 and 1635 A.D.

Kilflynn is in the middle of the area settled in the first century by the Ciarraighe (also Ciarraigh or Ciarraidh], the mediaeval tribe (from which the county name Kerry is derived) and claimed descendants of Ciar the son of the mythological queen Medb of Connacht and one of her lovers, king Fergus mac Róich of Ulster.

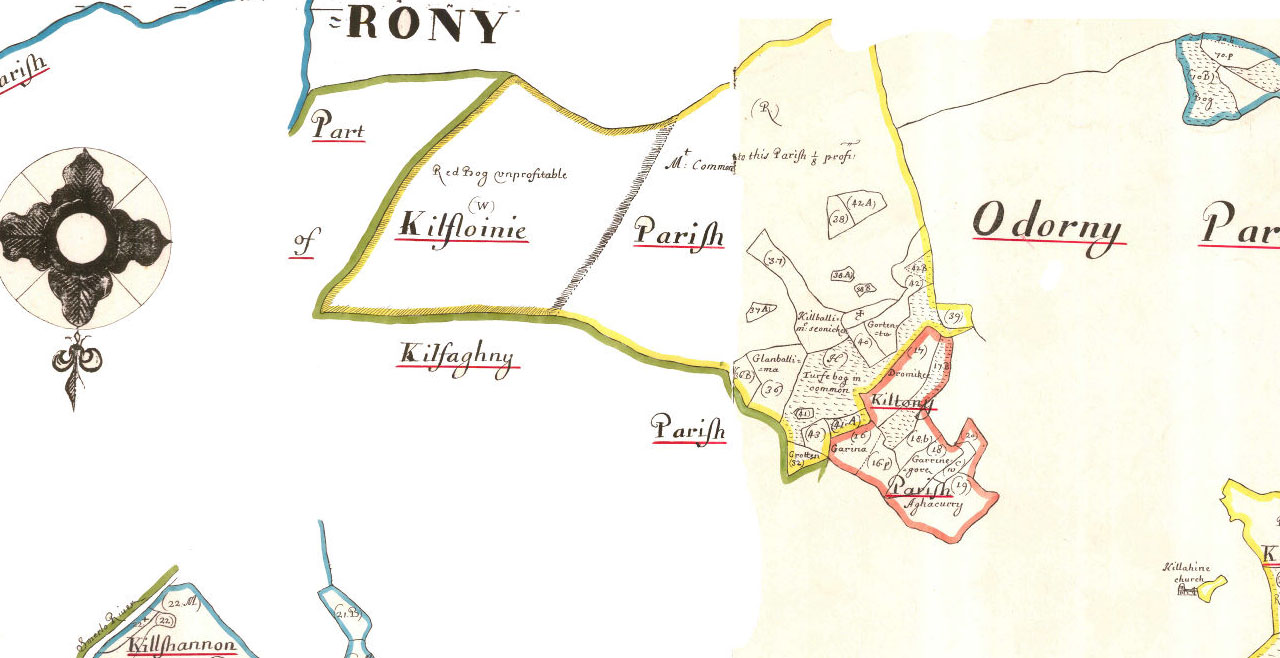
The parish of Kilflynn ('Kilfloinie') detailed in The Barony of Clanmaurice ('Clan Morris') from William Petty's Down Survey of Ireland, 1656-1658

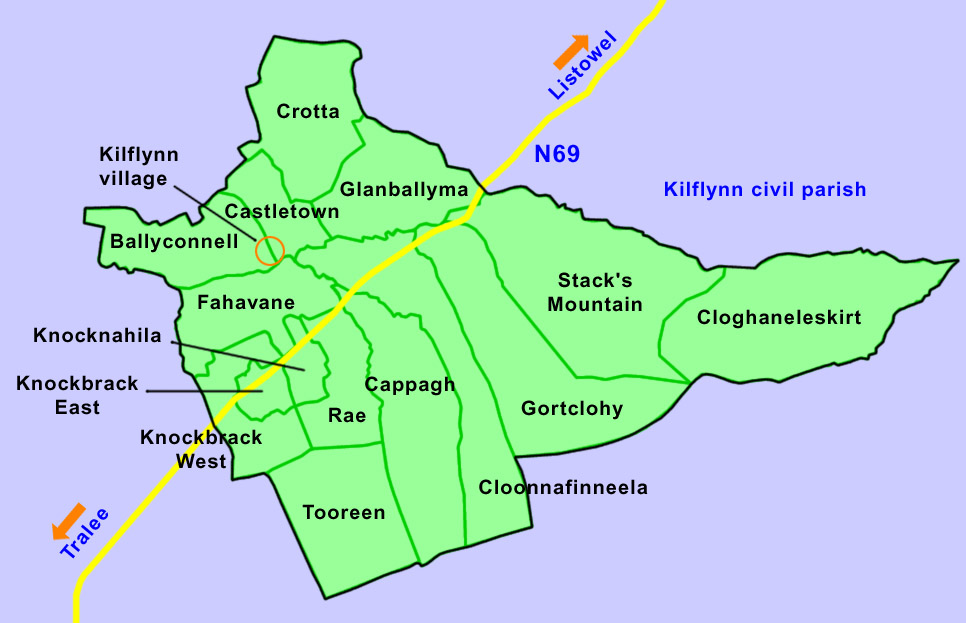
A map of the civil parish of Kilflynn indicating its sixteen townlands.

Prior to this the Velabri around Kerry Head and further south the Iverni people (or Iernoi from the earlier Greek) were noted by Ptolemy to be concentrated in the south-west area of Ireland, speaking the most primitive Goidelic language similar to Gaulish (as recorded on Ogham stones, with examples found close by in Knockbrack and Tralee, from the 6th Century). The Érainn, in Irish tradition, may be the name for the same group of people as there are linguistic links.

Kilflynn was a historical civil parish in the barony of Clanmaurice. This barony developed from the area which had been in the control of native leaders (especially O'Conors) but was taken over by the Norman, Maurice, son of Thomas FitzGerald of Shanid who died in 1213. Thomas FitzGerald himself was son of Maurice FitzGerald, Lord of Llanstephan, who had supported 'Strongbow', Lord Pembroke, in his Cambro-Norman invasion of Ireland in 1169 and who began the Geraldine dynasty in Ireland and their House of Desmond. Later earls of all County Kerry were scions of the FitzMaurice barons.

Kilflynn has sixteen constituent townlands: Ballyconnell, Cappagh, Castletown, Cloghaneleskirt, Cloonnafinneela, Crotta, Fahavane, Glanballyma, Gortclohy, Kilflynn (village), Knockbrack East, Knockbrack West, Knocknahila, Rea, Stack's Mountain and Tooreen.

The Stack family, also of Norman heritage, had their seat at Crotto (later known as Crotta) just north of Kilflynn and also owned surrounding townlands.

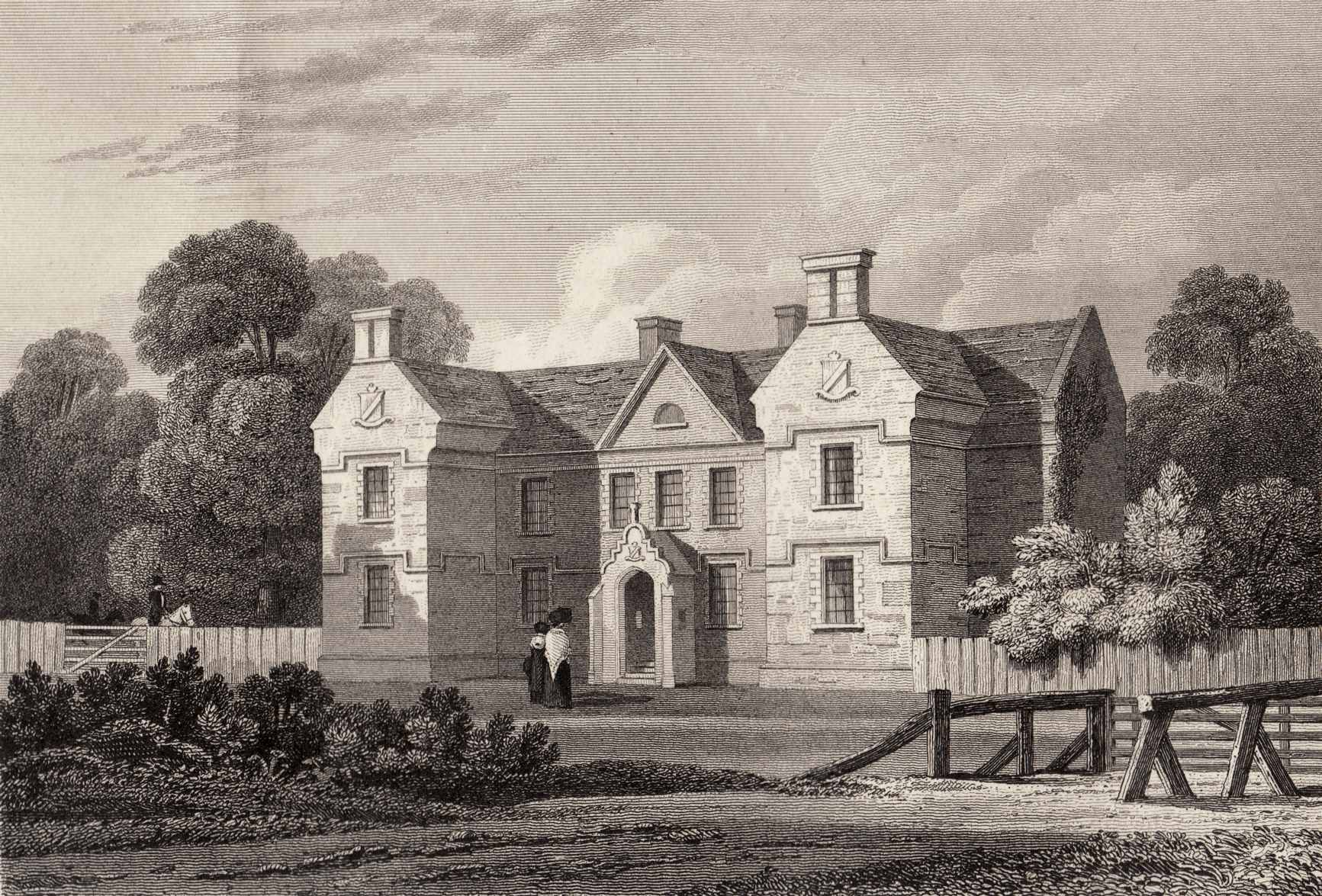
Crotta House, drawn by John Preston Neale, 1823

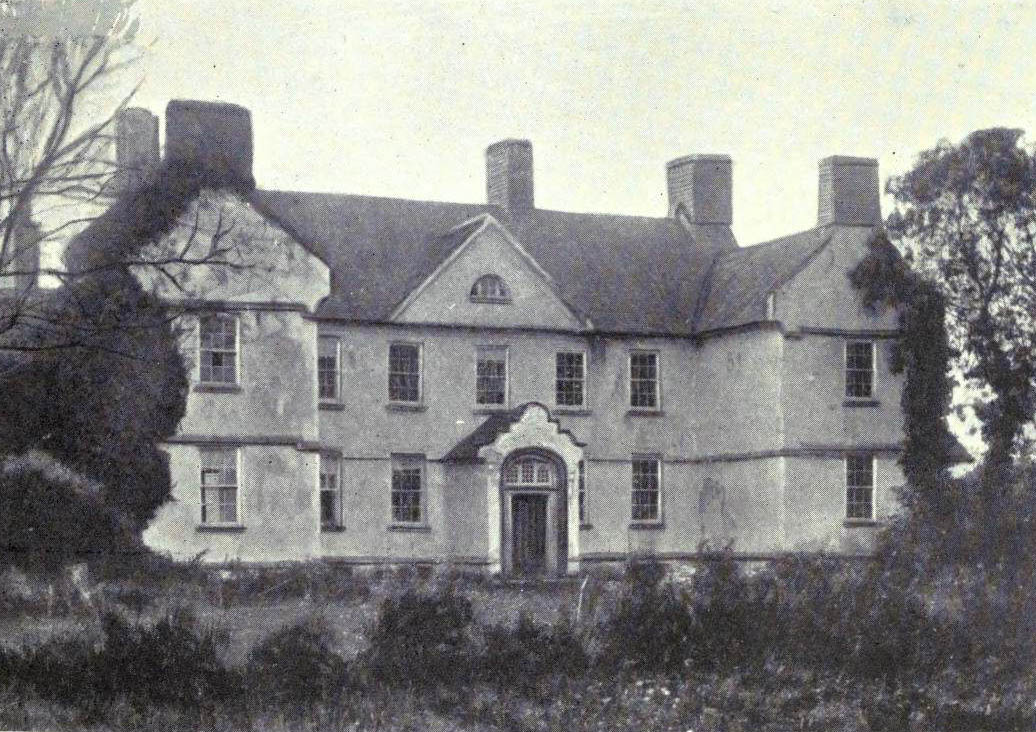
Crotta House, in 1902, already in disrepair.

Kilflynn had been known as Stackstown, and the name remains geographically in Stack's Mountains south-east of Kilflynn. The family landowners, namely James (owner of Garrynagore, Gortclohy and Cloghanaleskirt), John (owner of Aghacoora), Richard (owner of Killaspicktarvin (and more northerly townlands)) and Thomas Stack (owner of Gortaneare, Ballyconnell, Castletown, Crotta, Glanballyma, Knocknahila, Cloonnafinneela, and Cappagh) forfeited their landed possessions because of their support for the Irish Rebellion of 1641 and the subsequent Catholic Confederation. The reconquest of Ireland between 1649 and 1652 by Cromwellian forces after the English Civil War resulted in the Act for the Settlement of Ireland of 1652 which required a survey for the redistribution of land (hence Sir William Petty's survey) often to invading soldiers in lieu of wages. Henry Ponsonby, the younger brother of Sir John Ponsonby (a colonel of horse in the New Model Army), was the recipient of most of the Stacks' (and others') confiscated land - much of which was profitable. This was reconfirmed in 1666, after the Acts of Settlement. Part of the Down's Survey was Pender's Census, taken between 1654 and 1659. The census refers to 'The Barony of Clanmorice', the townland of 'Crottoe' and the 'Tituladoe' as Henry Ponsonby Esq. The population for the whole of Clanmaurice is given as 1126, of whom 86 are English and 1040 Irish. There are 17 with the surname 'Stack' and 17 with 'FitzMorrice and MacMorrice'.

Ponsonby built Crotta House in 1669. The house was sold in 1842 by Thomas Carrique Ponsonby (later resident in Dublin, so this possibly marked the end of the Ponsonbys in Kerry) and was being leased by about 1850 by Lieutenant Colonel Henry Horatio Kitchener, father to Horatio Herbert Kitchener, the first Earl Kitchener, Earl of Khartoum, Field Marshal of the British Army and Minister for War for Great Britain, who spent most of his youth at Crotta. The mostly derelict remains of the house itself collapsed or were demolished in the 20th century.

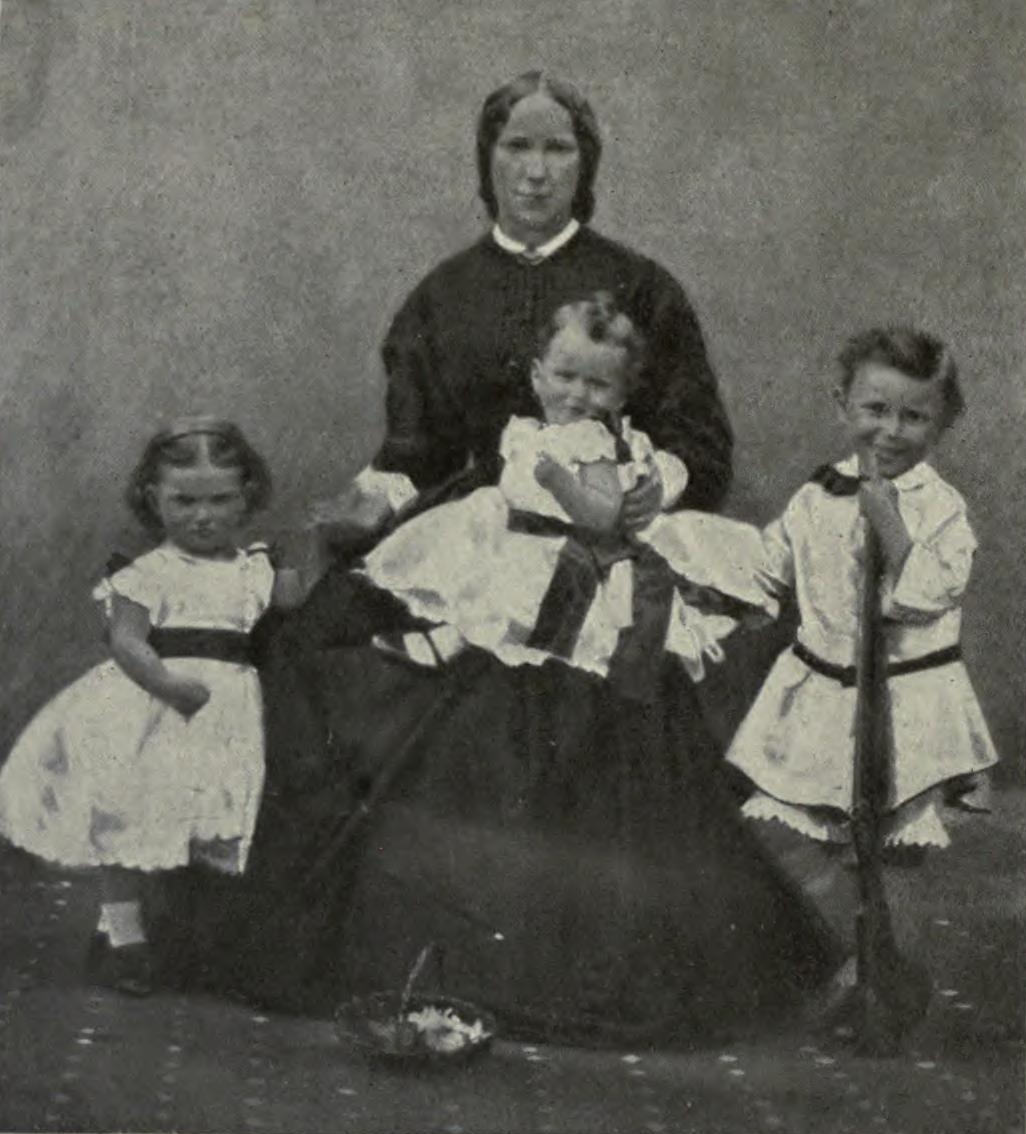
The young Horatio Herbert Kitchener on his mother's lap in 1851, with his older brother and sister

From 1840 the Poor Law Union plans (as basic administrative division) of Listowel replaced the Norman Clanmaurice barony and civil parish boundaries (although the latter continued to be used to make comparisons) after the Poor Relief (Ireland) Act 1838.

Kilflynn was on the main road from Tralee to County Limerick. Farming was the principal industry for centuries and services such as forges for smithing, and lime kilns from the late 1600s (to make lime for acidic soils) developed around this. Local forges were still operational in the mid-20th century. The remains of some kilns can still be found dotted about the landscape. There was a population decline, possibly partly associated with the opening of what is now the main Tralee-Listowel road to the south in 1846, and then the North Kerry railway line with stations opening at Abbeydorney and Lixnaw in 1880 (the line ceasing services entirely from 1978). However, there was also from the 1840s onwards the significant effect of the peak years of the Great Famine in which between 20% and 30% of the population of Kerry died or emigrated (see map). In 1841, 1851 and 1861 the population of Kilflynn village was 147, 134 and 119 respectively (in 2011 it was 126). The area covers two election districts (Kilflynn and Kilfeighny) so these figures may not be entirely representative.

== History from 1900 ==
Kilflynn people joined the Irish Volunteers, were involved in the War of Independence and the Civil War.

The Kilflynn company of the Irish Volunteers was formed in 1913 of about 100 men, drilled by two ex-British soldiers and reservists named Collins and Sheehy. On 13 June 1914 a separate corps formed in Lixnaw, supported on the day by the Kilflynn and other Volunteers. Later in 1914, the reservists were called up to fight in what became World War I and in addition John Redmond encouraged the Irish to join the Allied forces, so the company disbanded as a result and didn't reform until 1917 at Lixnaw. Engagements with the Royal Irish Constabulary (R.I.C) and the "Tans" ("Black and Tans", officially the R.I.C. Reserve Force) became vehement from 1919 after Churchill's call to British war veterans to assist in Ireland. In March 1921 British forces created a cordon starting from Kilflynn to the Atlantic coast in an attempt to trap and round up IRA members: hundreds of men were imprisoned in Ballyheigue Castle, including just one IRA man.

After two previous failures, the IRA succeeded in blowing up the bridge over the Shannow where the road to Kilflynn joins the Abbeydorney-Lixnaw road (R557). Units from Kilflynn and Abbeydorney lay in wait for Crown forces and opened fire. There were injuries on both sides and a British officer was killed attempting to cross the river.

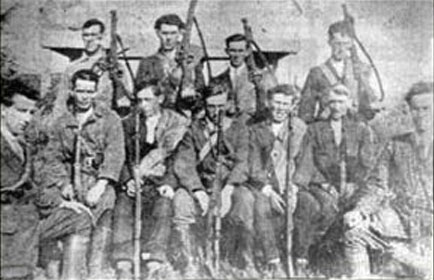
Kilflynn IRA Flying Column, 1922.Back (L to R): Denis O'Connell (Lixnaw), Stephen Fuller (Kilflynn), William Hartnett (Mountcoal), Tim Twomey (Kilflynn).Front (L to R): Terry Brosnan (Lixnaw), John McElligott (Leam, Kilflynn), Danny O'Shea (Kilflynn), Timothy (Aero) Lyons (Garrynagore), Tim Sheehy (Lyre), Pete Sullivan (Ballyduff), Paddy Mahony (Ballyegan, Battalion O.C.).

Kilflynn IRA members in the Civil War (‘Irregulars’) included John McElligott, Danny O’Shea, George O’Shea, Stephen Fuller and Tim Twomey. The latter three were blown up by Free State soldiers using a landmine at Ballyseedy Cross, near Tralee, along with six other Irregulars. Fuller, the only survivor of the explosion, was blown clear and escaped the subsequent coup-de-grâce shooting and bombing. A fabricated explanation of the event, blaming Irregulars for the mine, was given official approval. An investigation by Free State Lieutenant Niall Harrington referred to the report as "totally untrue." The killings came to represent a defining event in modern Irish history.

Fuller later became a Fianna Fáil TD for North Kerry.

== Modern-day village ==
In recent decades, especially in the surrounding farmland, migration of youth for better financial prospects has kept a smaller, ageing population present, as is typically reflected elsewhere in rural villages of Ireland. However, a number of new houses have been built and the local school, Scoil Treasa Naofa (St.Teresa's National School) (first sited at Castletown in 1821, just north of the village), has had increased admissions.

Kilflynn has two pubs, a fast food restaurant and a beauty parlour. The Catholic Church is St.Mary's and there is also the 18th century Kilflynn Church of Ireland which is used as St.Columba’s Heritage Centre and Museum; these buildings are Recorded Protected Structures. The latter contains the life story of the major local historical figure of note, Horatio Herbert Kitchener, Earl of Khartoum, the former British Field Marshal and Secretary of State for War, who was born in Ballylongford and spent most of his youth at nearby Crotta House. A few outbuildings are all that remain of the original estate.

Kilflynn and Abbeydorney are the two villages in which church services are held in the modern Roman Catholic parish of Abbeydorney, whose priest is Fr. Jerry Keane. The parish is in the deanery of St.Brendan's and is one of 53 in the diocese of Kerry, whose bishop is The Most Reverend Raymond Anthony Browne.

The local parliamentary constituency (since 2016) is Kerry, returning five Teachtaí Dála (TDs) to the Dáil Éireann. The current TDs (34th Dáil, 2024) are Norma Foley (Fianna Fáil), Michael Cahill (Fianna Fáil), Pa Daly (Sinn Féin), Danny Healy-Rae (Independent) and Michael Healy-Rae (Independent).

Images of the parish of Kilflynn: click to view
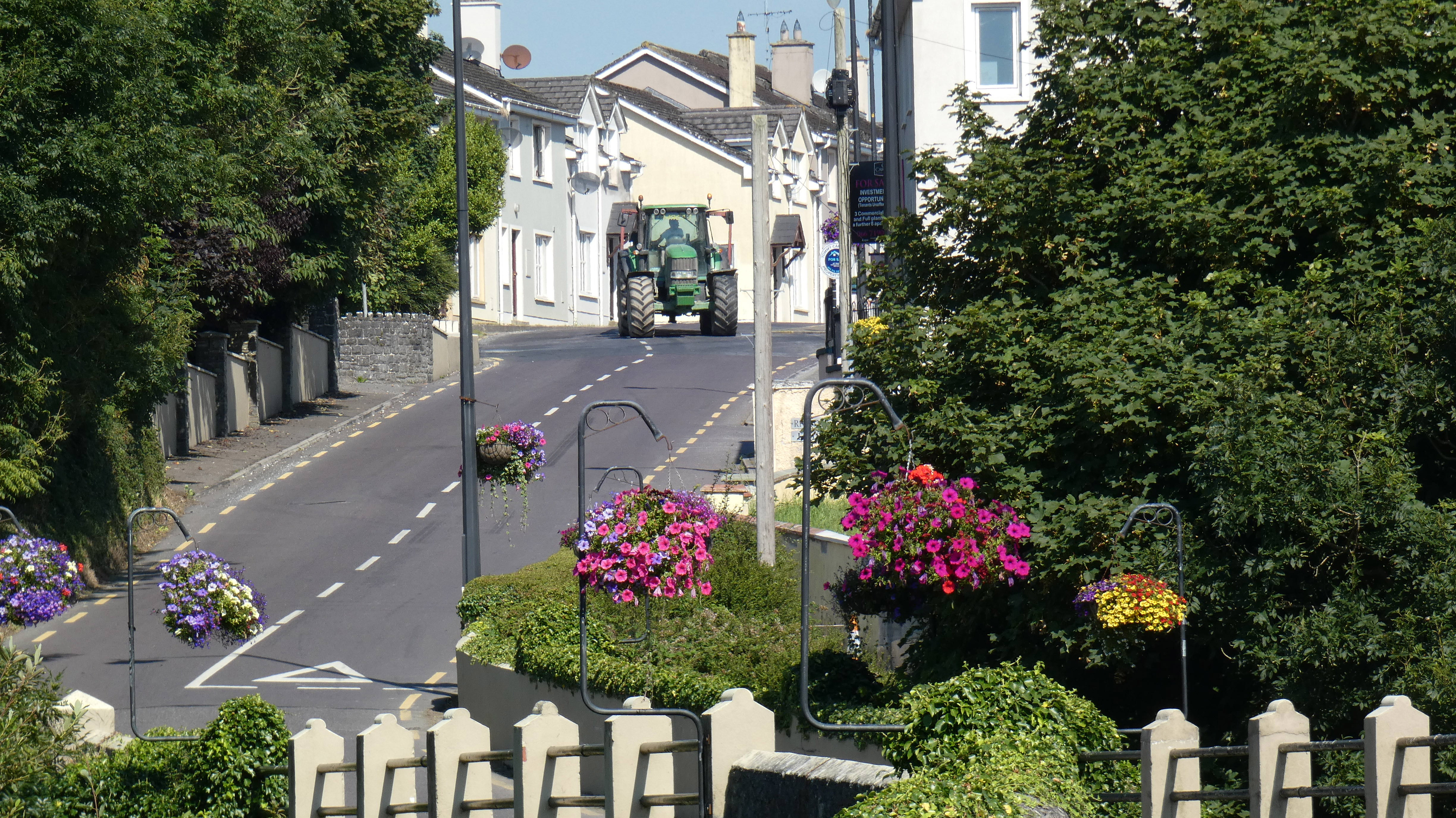
A view of the main road through the village, looking north, August 2022.

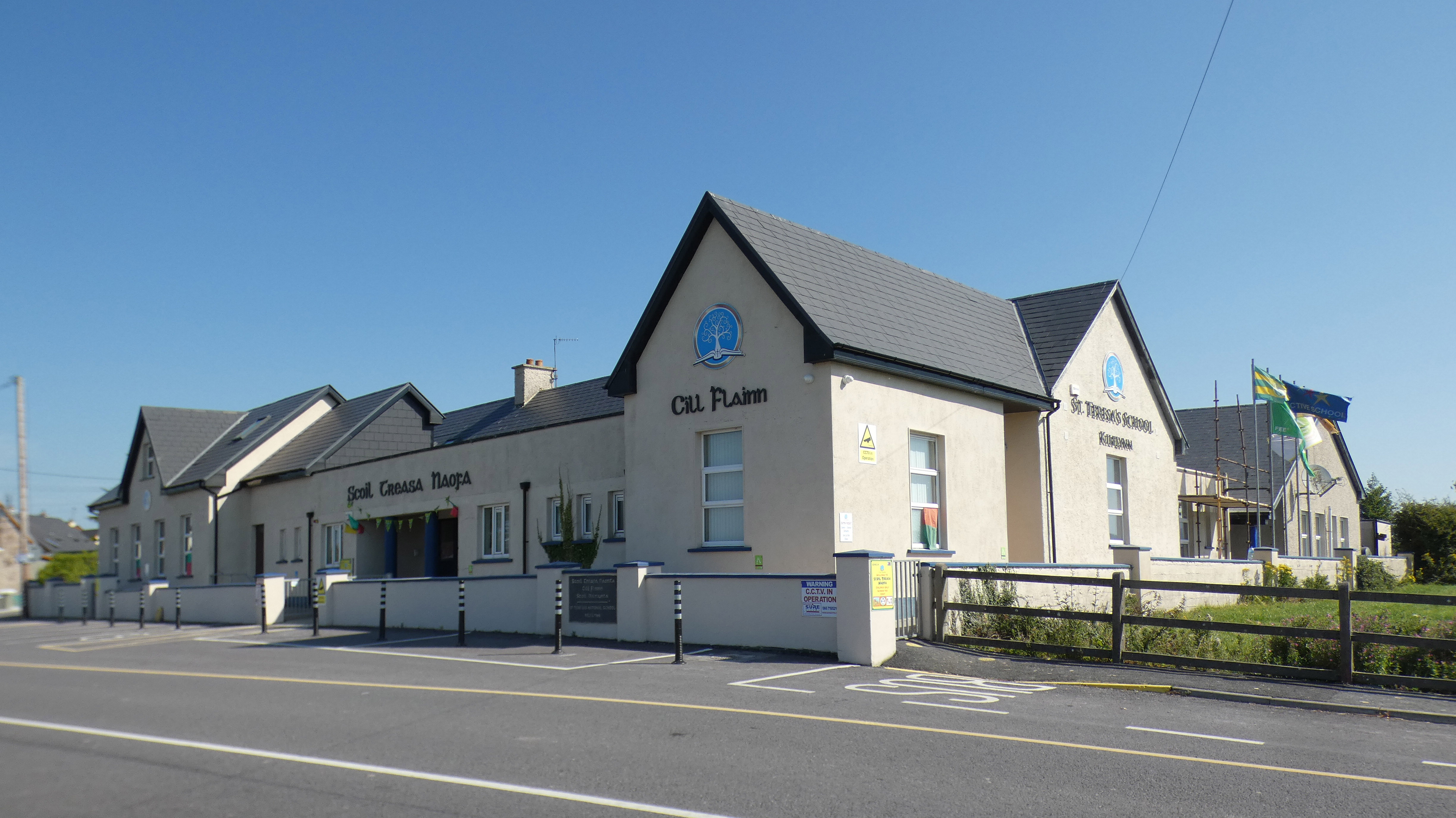
Scoil Treasa Naofa (St.Teresa's National School), townland of Castletown.

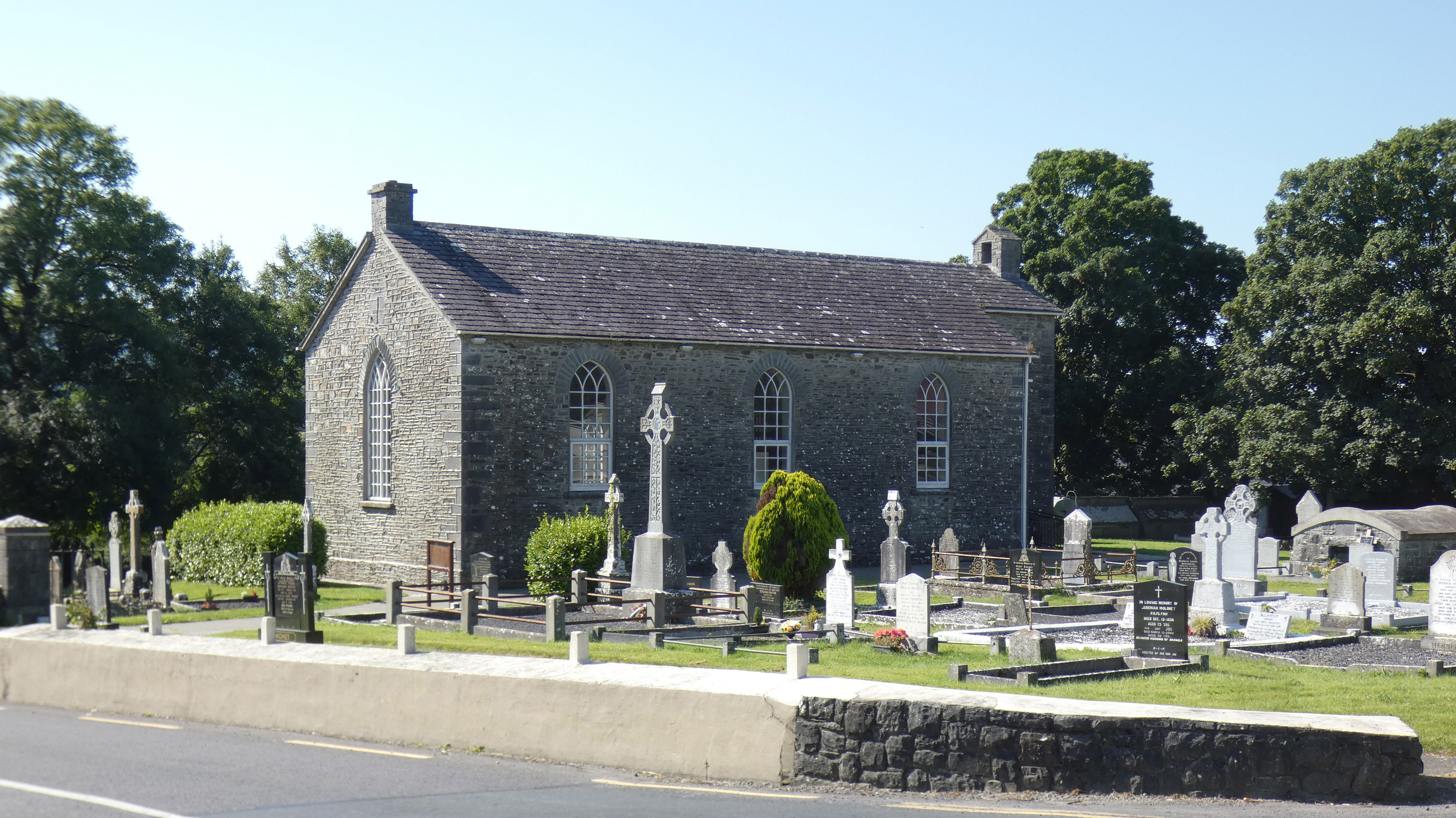
St. Columba's heritage centre, formerly a protestant church erected c.1810-11 on the site of a ruinous former church. A belltower was added in 1840. Restoration was completed in 1993. The graveyard contains protestant and catholic burials.

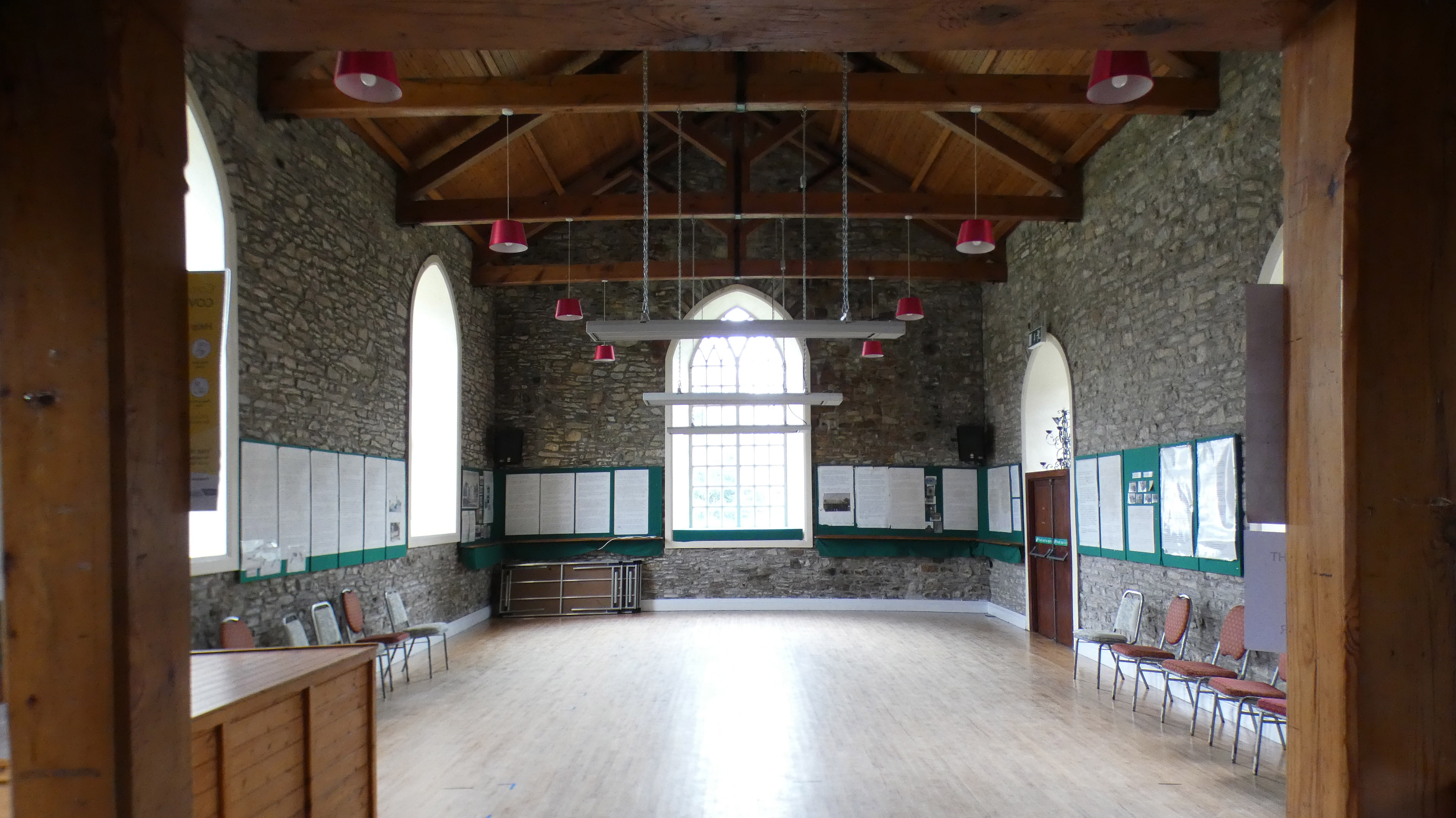
The interior of St. Columba's heritage centre, an active village hall containing accounts of the local history around the walls.

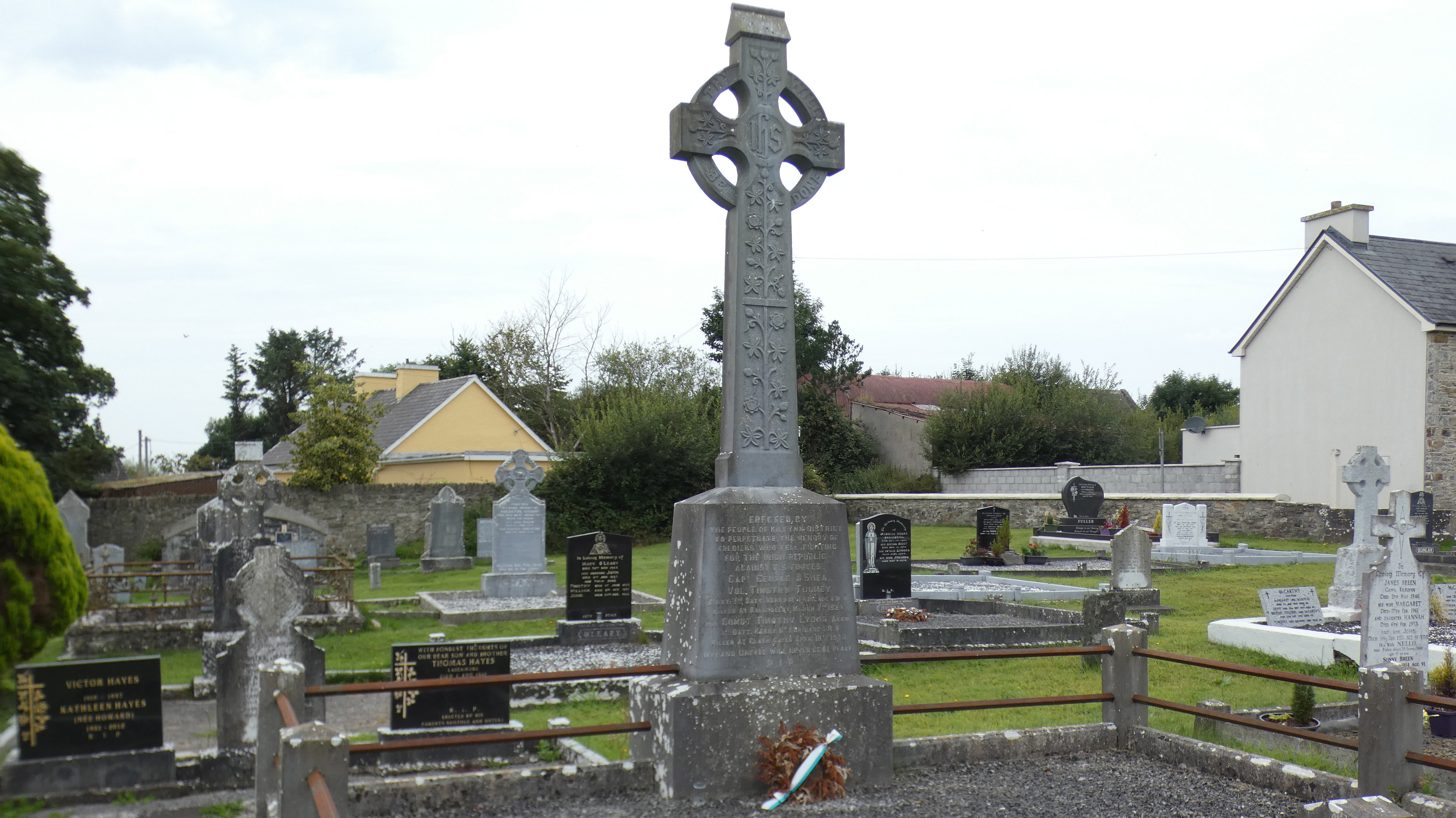
The Republican plot at St. Columba's, grave of George O'Shea, Timothy Tuomey and Timothy Lyons, the former two of Kilflynn killed in the Ballyseedy massacre, the latter of Garrynagore killed at Clashmealcon caves.

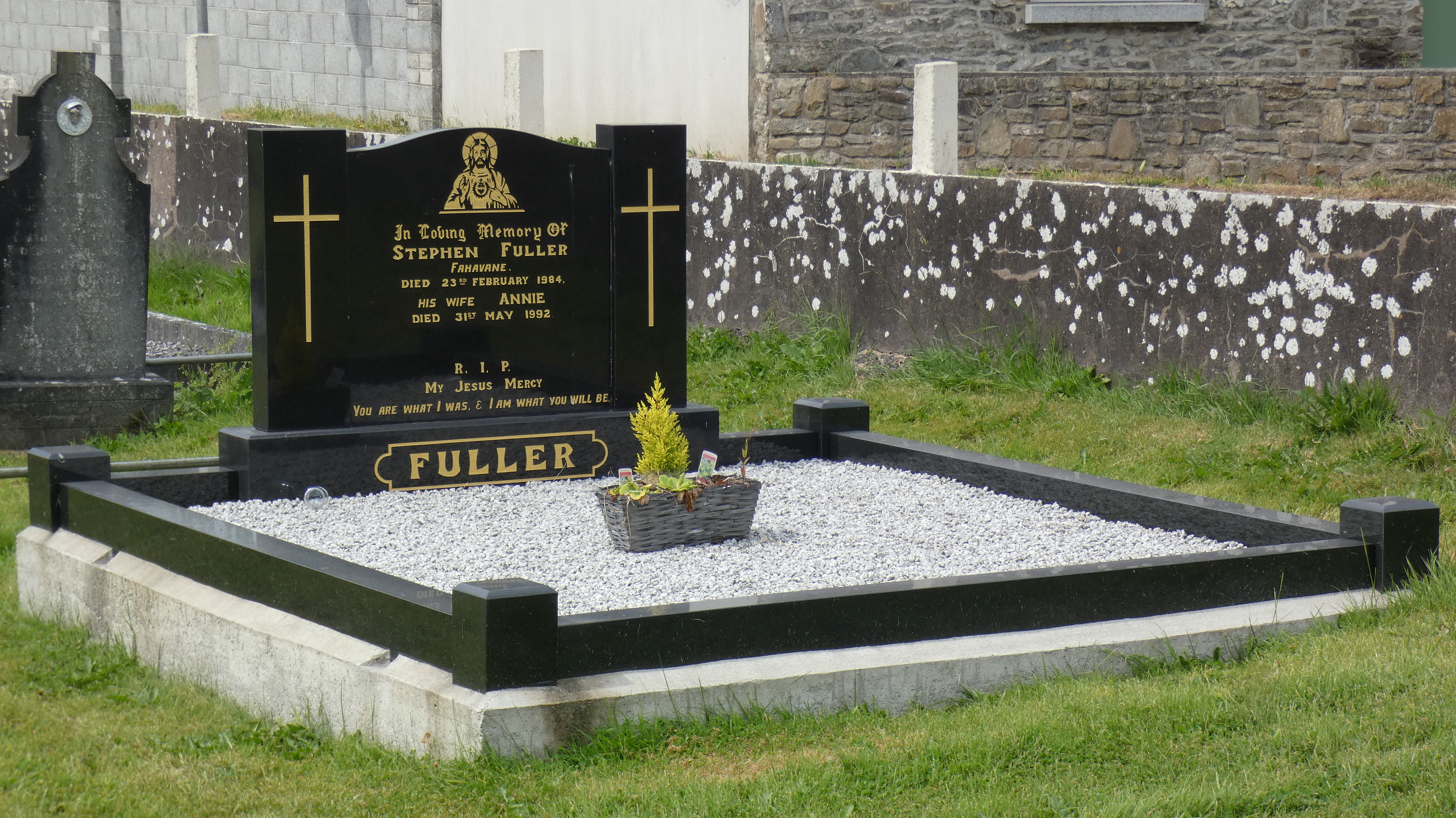
The grave at St. Columba's of Stephen Fuller, sole survivor of the Ballyseedy massacre and later a T.D. for Fianna Fáil.

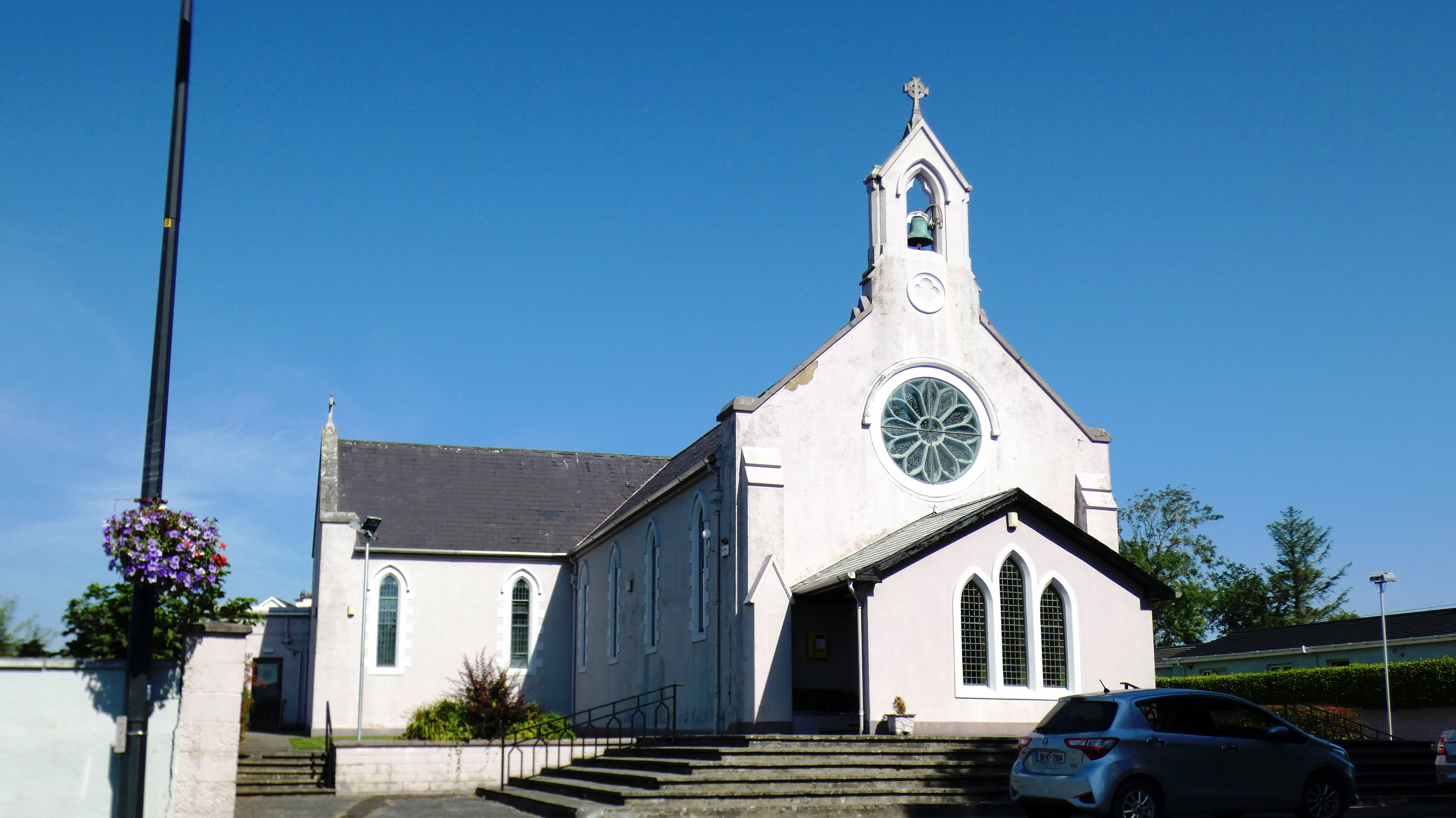
St. Mary's Roman Catholic church. Dated 1849, it was extended in 1935 and renovated in 1979.

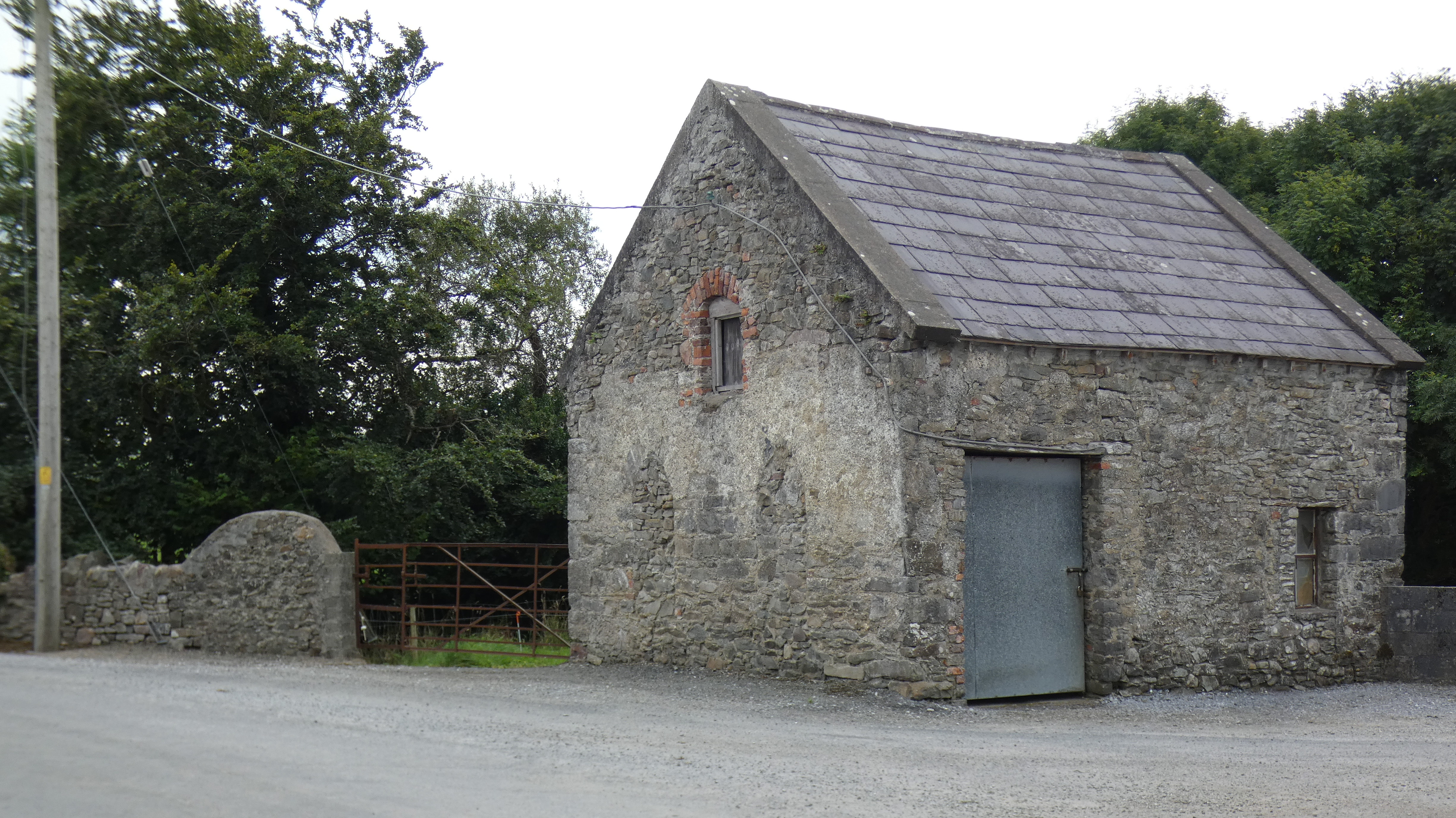
A gate lodge at the northern edge of the old Crotta estate, built c.1850. This is the only extant whole structure of the estate. Crotta House was finally demolished in the 20th century.

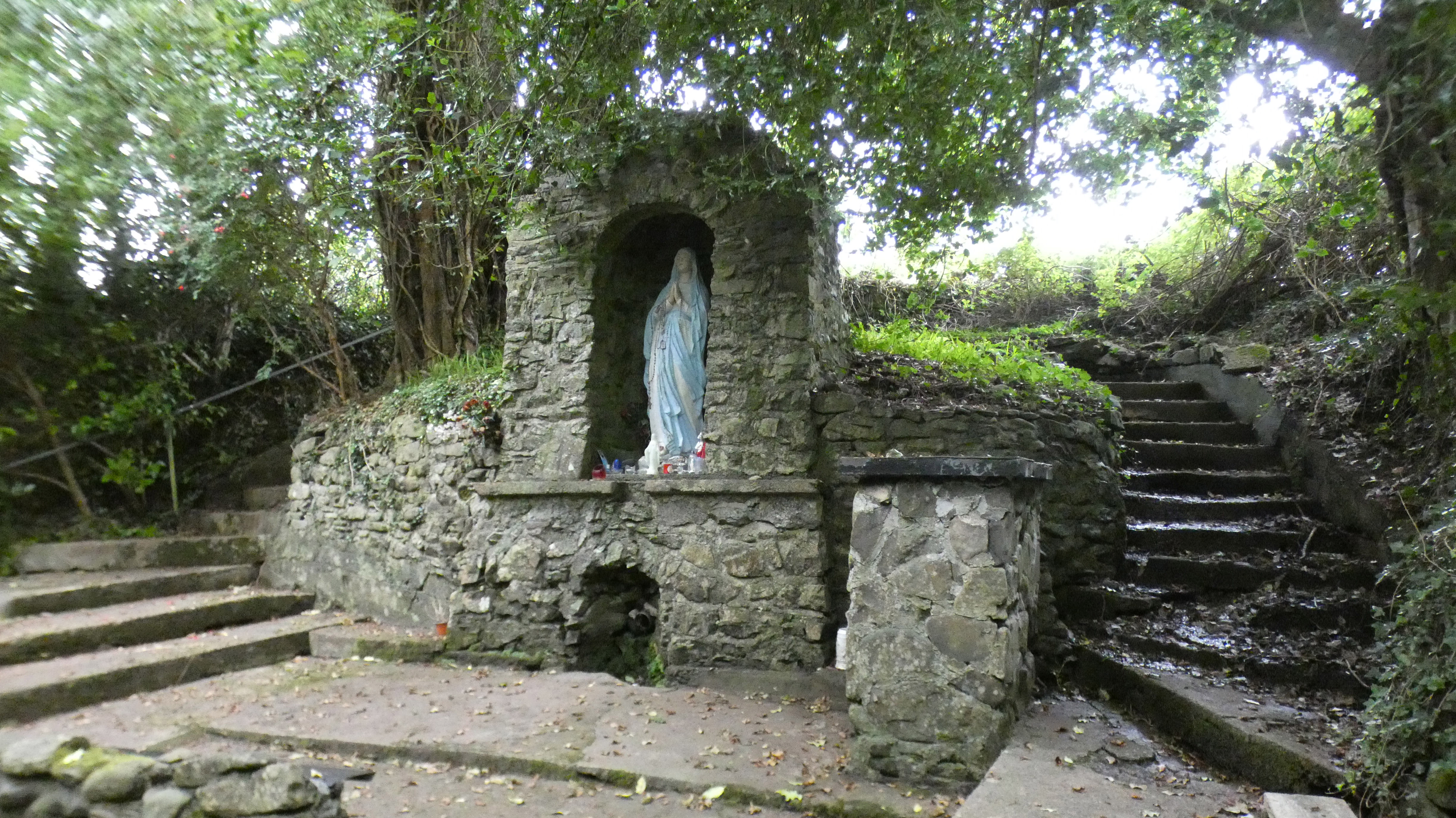
The shrine constructed around Tobar Flainn - the holy well of St.Flainn - by Muintir na Tíre in 1953. The issue was formerly from some stones near the Rae, a tributary by the well that joins the Shannow.

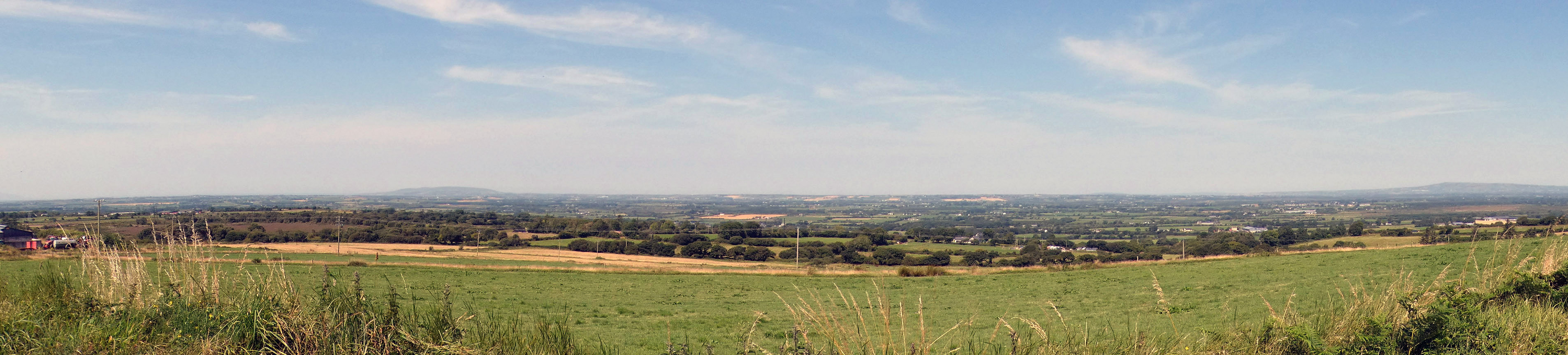
Panorama made from the road between Kilflynn village and the N69, looking across the Listowel plain from the townland of Glanballyma.

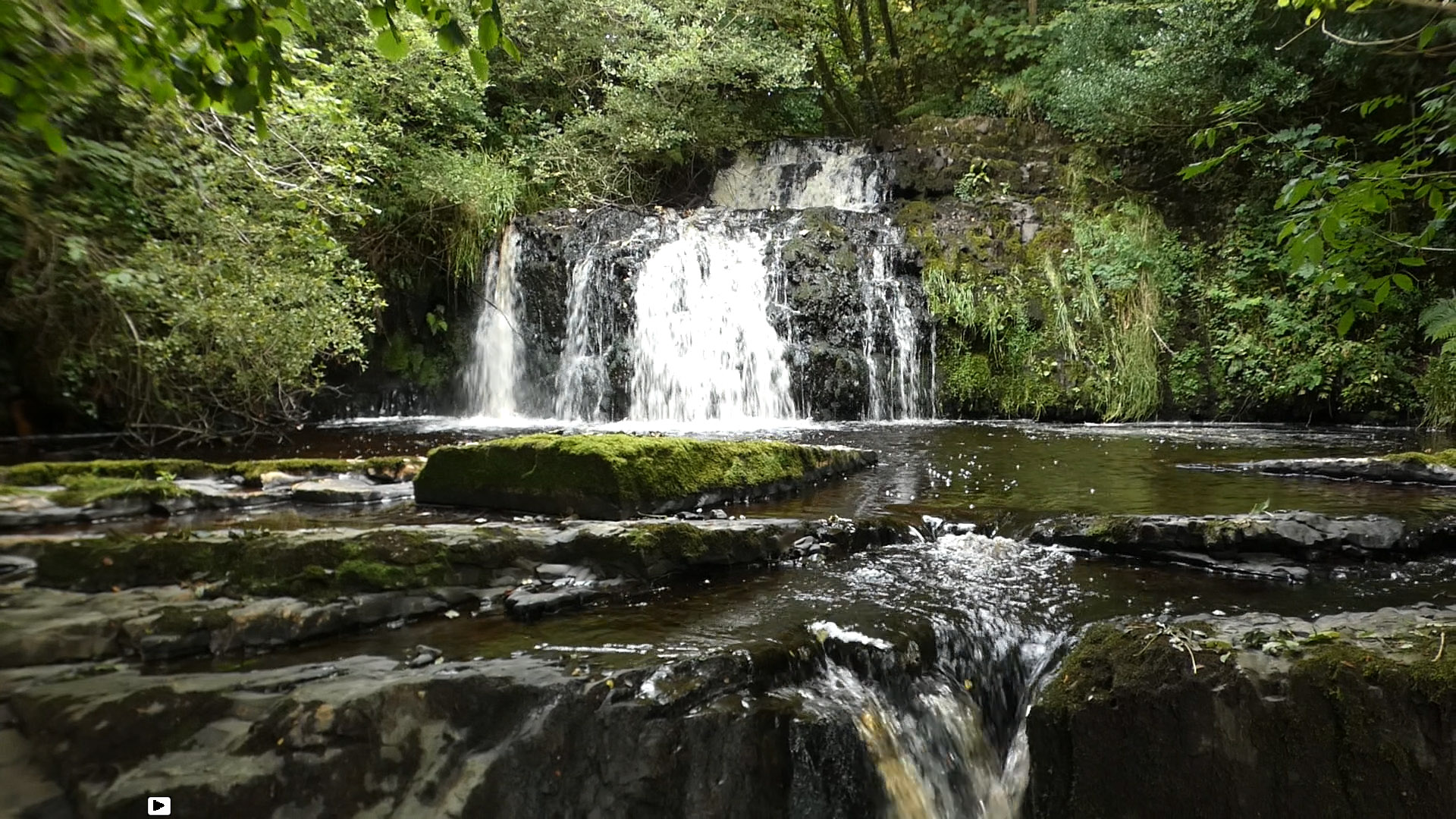
Part of the waterfall of the River Shannow between the townlands of Gortclohy and Glanballyma. The vertical drop of the whole falls is about 20 metres.

== See also ==
- List of towns and villages in Ireland
