= Stack's Mountain, County Kerry =

Townland in County Kerry, Ireland

Stack's Mountain Irish: Cnoc an Stacaigh
- townland
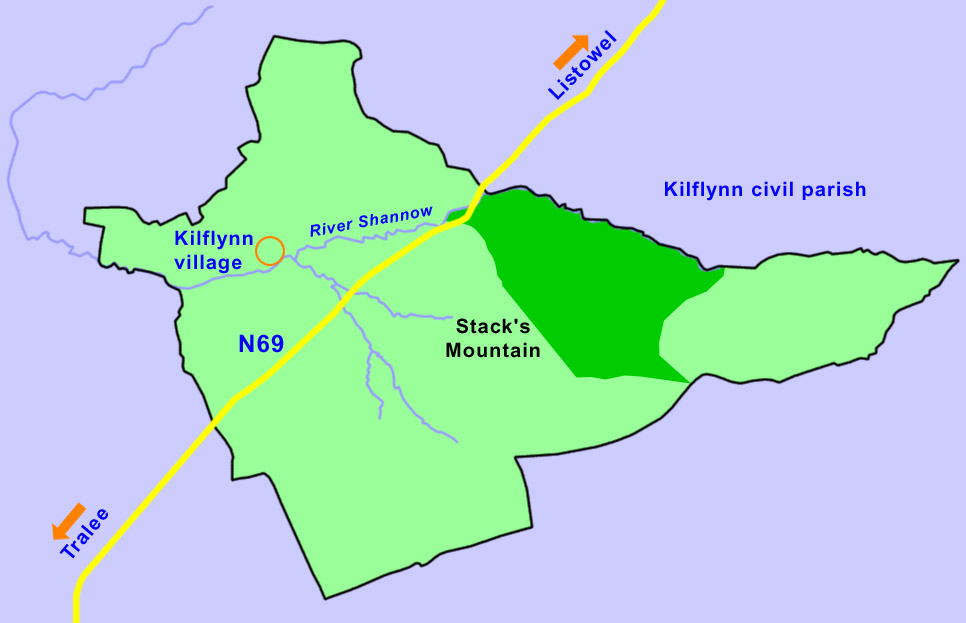

- Stack's Mountain shown within Ireland
- Country: Ireland
- County: County Kerry
- Barony: Clanmaurice
- Civil parish: Kilflynn

Area
  - Total: 376.27 ha (929.8 acres)

Stack's Mountain (Irish: Cnoc an Stacaigh) is a townland of County Kerry, Ireland, named after the Stack family. The range of hills known as Stack's Mountains - which includes the eponymous peak (323m) - extend over a larger area).

It is one of sixteen ancient townlands of the civil parish of Kilflynn and lies to the west of the parish. Its northern edge is bounded by the River Shannow from the Waterfall, and is just clipped by the N69 Tralee-Listowel road. It is partly forested and largely rural.

== History ==
The townland was listed as 'common and unprofitable' land. The Stacks owned thousands of acres between them in the parish and elsewhere. Because the family supported the Irish Rebellion of 1641, and the Catholic Confederation of Kilkenny, their land was taken by Cromwell's forces following the Act for the Settlement of Ireland in 1652. In 1666, Henry Ponsonby, a 46-year-old former soldier who had fought for Cromwell, was granted the land after the Act of Settlement of 1662.

== Representation ==
Stack's Mountain is in the Roman Catholic parish of Abbeydorney, whose priest is the Very Reverend Denis O’Mahony.

The local parliamentary constituency (since 2016) is Kerry, returning five Teachtaí Dála (TDs) to Dáil Éireann.

== See also ==
- Civil parishes in Ireland
- Kilflynn
- Stack's Mountains
