= Tooreen, County Kerry =

Tooreen Irish: An Tuairín
- townland
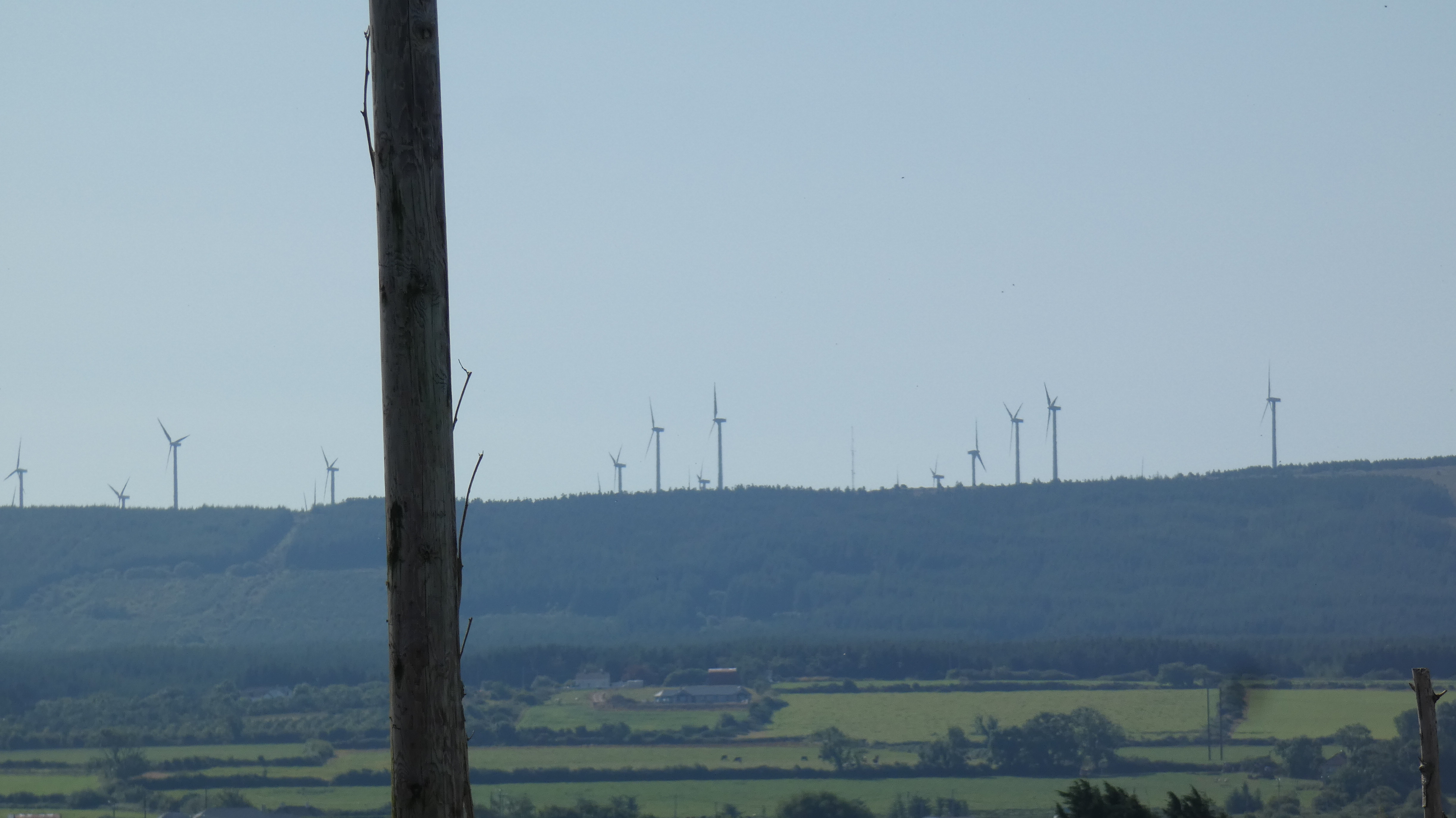

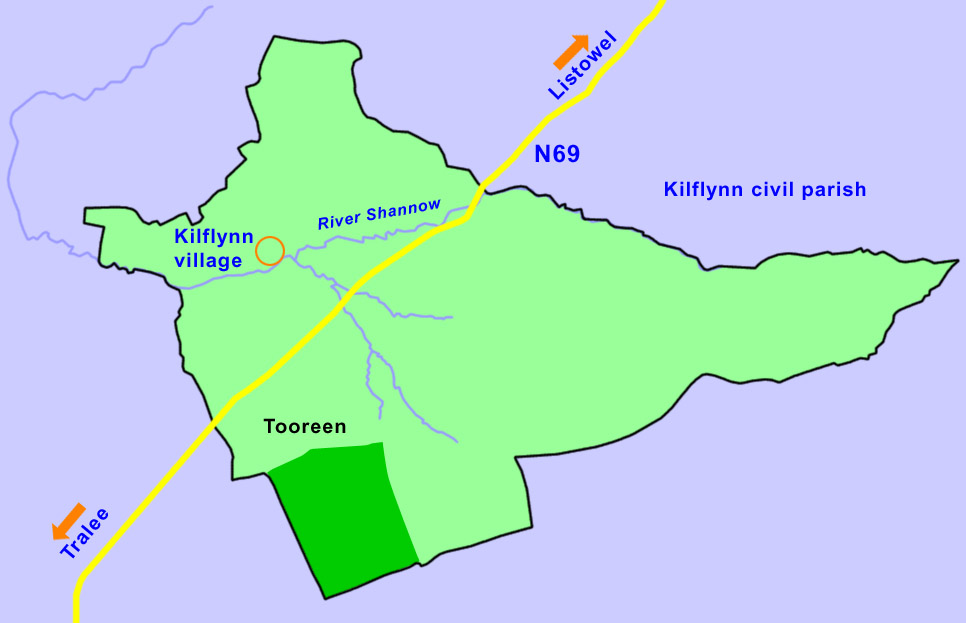

- Tooreen shown within Ireland
- Country: Ireland
- County: County Kerry
- Barony: Clanmaurice
- Civil parish: Kilflynn

Tooreen, (Irish: An Tuairín) is a townland of County Kerry, Ireland.

It is one of the sixteen ancient townlands of the civil parish of Kilflynn. The area covers 201.26 hectares (497.33 acres) of rural land.

== Archaeology, history and landscape ==
An archaeological site, listed as a National Monument, was found in Tooreen, namely a fulacht fiadh (burnt mound) (Universal Transverse Mercator grid reference: 29U 489859 620331). This site will require further research.

In 1641, Tooreen was described as 'common and unprofitable land'. Following the Act for the Settlement of Ireland in 1652, land held by supporters of the Catholic Confederation was forfeited. After the further Act of Settlement of 1662, Tooreen was given to the following Protestant Cromwellian soldiers: Captain Henry Ponsonby (brother of Sir John Ponsonby), Lord King (a commissioner in the court of claims for Irish settlements), Henry Austin and Colonel Chidley Coote (son of Sir Charles Coote) in 1666. Ponsonby also received several other townlands solely in his name in the parish.

The land has conifer plantations and rises moving south up the western part of Stack's Mountains. Immediately along the southern boundary is the Tursillagh Wind Farm, containing 31 turbines.

== Representation ==
Tooreen is in the Roman Catholic parish of Abbeydorney, whose priest is the Very Reverend Denis O’Mahony and who takes services at Abbeydorney and Kilflynn.

The townland is in the parliamentary constituency of Kerry (since 2016), returning five TDs to Dáil Éireann.

== See also ==
- Kilflynn
- Civil parishes in Ireland
