= Cappagh =

Cappagh may refer to:

== Northern Ireland, UK ==
- Cappagh, County Armagh, a townland in County Armagh
- Cappagh, County Down, a townland in County Down
- Cappagh, County Tyrone, a townland, village and civil parish in County Tyrone

== Republic of Ireland ==
- Cappagh, County Carlow, a townland in County Carlow
- Cappagh, County Cavan, a townland in County Cavan
- Cappagh, County Clare, townlands in County Clare
- Cappagh, County Cork, townlands in County Cork
- Cappagh, County Donegal, a townland in County Donegal
- Cappagh, County Dublin, a townland in County Dublin
- Cappagh, County Galway, townlands in County Galway
- Cappagh, County Kerry, townlands in County Kerry
- Cappagh, County Kildare, a townland in County Kildare
- Cappagh, County Kilkenny, townlands in County Kilkenny
- Cappagh, County Limerick, a parish in County Limerick
- Cappagh, County Waterford
- Cappagh, County Westmeath, a townland in Lackan civil parish
- Cappagh GAA, a Gaelic Athletic Association club in County Kildare
