= Rea, County Kerry =

Rea Irish: An Ré
- townland
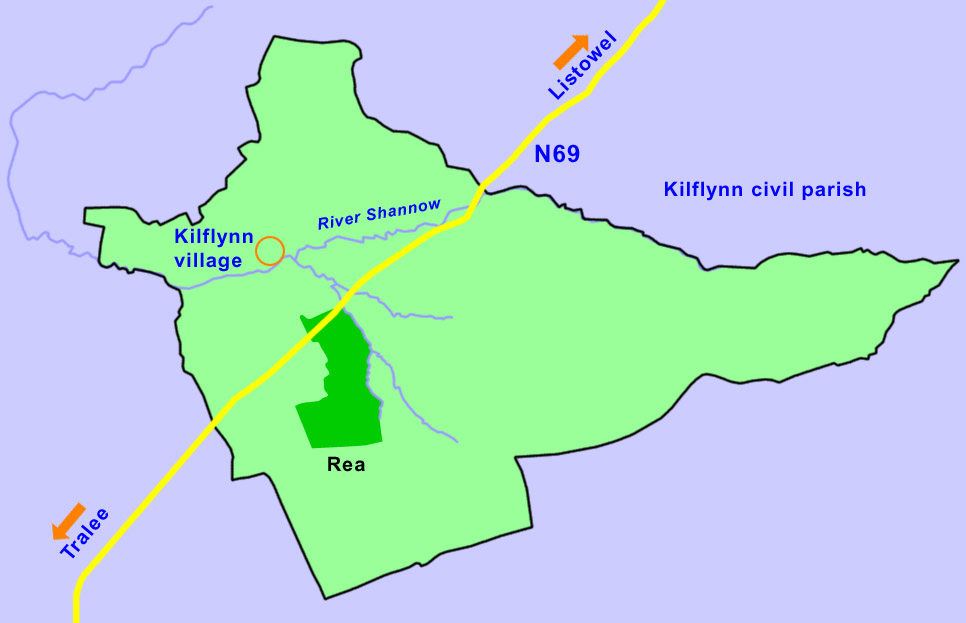

- Rea shown within Ireland
- Country: Ireland
- County: County Kerry
- Barony: Clanmaurice
- Civil parish: Kilflynn

Rea (Irish: An Ré) is a townland of County Kerry, Ireland.

It is one of the sixteen original townlands of the civil parish of Kilflynn. Its eastern border with Cappagh is along the River Rea, a tributary of the River Shannow. It is traversed at its northern tip by the N69 Tralee-Listowel road. The area covers 106.83 hectares (263.98 acres) of rural land.

== History ==
In 1641, Rea was described as "common and unprofitable land". Following the Act for the Settlement of Ireland in 1652, land held by supporters of the Catholic Confederation was forfeited. After the further Act of Settlement of 1662, Rea was given to the following Protestant Cromwellian soldiers: Captain Henry Ponsonby (brother of Sir John Ponsonby), Lord King (a commissioner in the court of claims for Irish settlements), Henry Austin and Colonel Chidley Coote (son of Sir Charles Coote) in 1666. Ponsonby also received several other townlands solely in his name in the parish.

== Representation ==
Rae is in the Roman Catholic parish of Abbeydorney, whose priest is the Very Reverend Denis O’Mahony and who takes services at Abbeydorney and Kilflynn.

The townland is in the parliamentary constituency of Kerry (since 2016), returning five TDs to Dáil Éireann.

== See also ==
- Civil parishes in Ireland
- Kilflynn
