= Lyracrumpane =

Townland in County Kerry, Ireland

Coordinates: 52.3516°N 9.4932°W

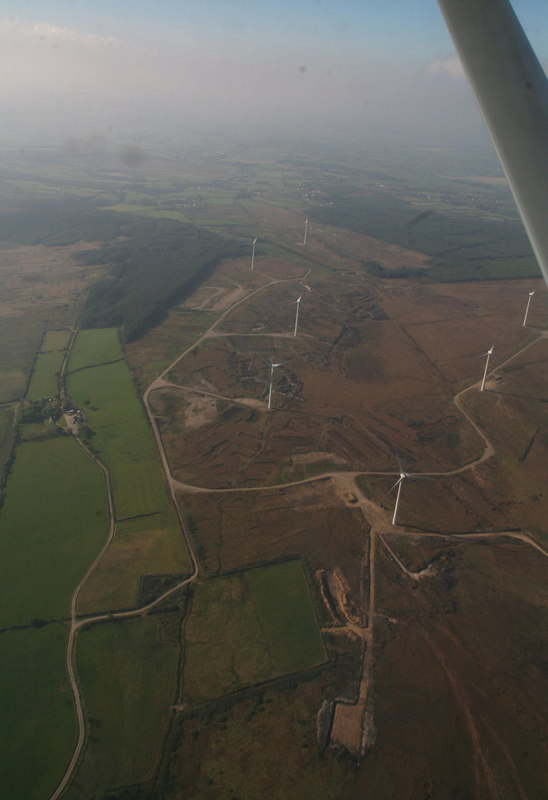
Aerial view of a windfarm, on the Stack's Mountains, near Lyracrumpane

Lyracrumpane, also sometimes spelled Lyreacrompane (Irish: Ladhar an Chrompáin), is a townland in the civil parish of Kilfeighny and the historical barony of Clanmaurice in County Kerry, Ireland. It is in the Stack's Mountains area of North Kerry. The townland, which has an area of approximately 3.9 square kilometres (1.5 sq mi), had a population of 66 as of the 2011 census.

Lyreacrompane Community Centre was officially opened in November 2000, by the Minister of Justice and Law Reform John O'Donoghue. There are a number of Mass path trails in the nearby Coillte wood. The local national (primary) school, Lyracrompane National School, had an enrollment of 26 children as of July 2025.

The Dan Paddy Andy Matchmaking Festival is held annually in the area. This matchmaking festival usually opens over the August bank holiday weekend. At its launch in 1998, Mícheál Ó Muircheartaigh, joined by John B. Keane and Ogie Moran, revealed a memorial to the local matchmaker after whom it is named.
