= Knockbrack East, County Kerry =

Knockbrack East Irish: An Cnoc Breac Thoir
- townland
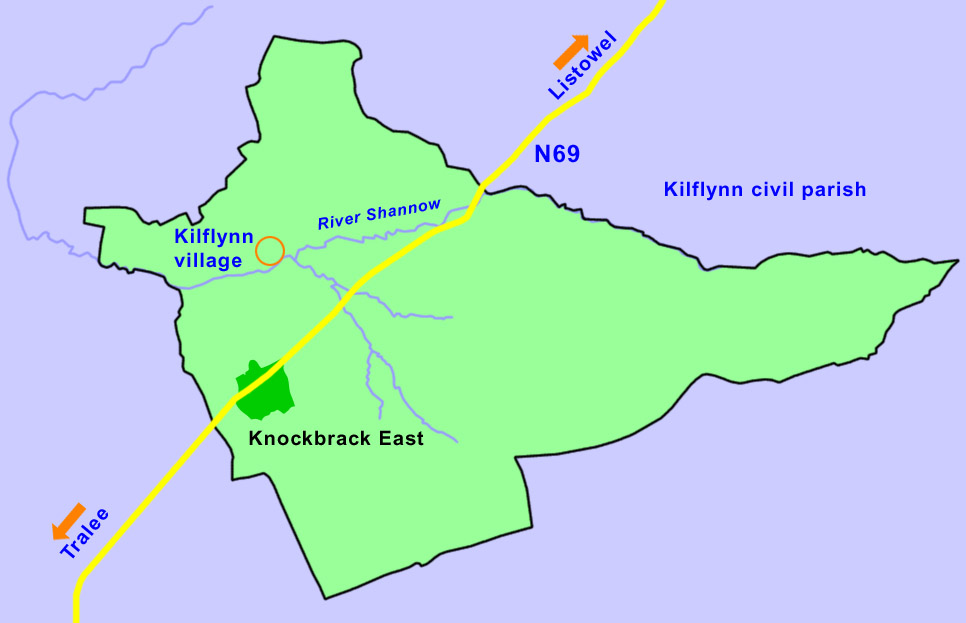

- Knockbrack East shown within Ireland
- Country: Ireland
- County: County Kerry
- Barony: Clanmaurice
- Civil parish: Kilflynn

Knockbrack East, (Irish:An Cnoc Breac Thoir) is a townland of County Kerry, Ireland.

It is one of the sixteen original townlands of the civil parish of Kilflynn and is its smallest. It is traversed by the N69 Tralee-Listowel road. The area covers 34.43 hectares (85.08 acres) of rural land.

== Archaeology and history ==
Knockbrack East contains two archaeological sites, namely ringforts, that are recognised as National Monuments: (Universal Transverse Mercator grid references): (29U 489356 621719 (marked as a circular enclosure on the Ordnance Survey maps of 1841 and 1898), 29U 489306 621600 (a collapsed L-shaped souterrain was noted in 1945, being used for animal burials).

In 1641, Knockbrack East was described as 'common and unprofitable land'. Following the Act for the Settlement of Ireland in 1652, land held by supporters of the Catholic Confederation was forfeited. After the further Act of Settlement of 1662, Knockbrack East was granted to Protestant Cromwellian soldiers, Captain Henry Ponsonby (brother of Sir John Ponsonby), John King (a commissioner in the court of claims for Irish settlements), Henry Austin and Colonel Chidley Coote (son of Sir Charles Coote) in 1666. Ponsonby received several other townlands solely in his name in the parish.

== Representation ==
Knockbrack East is in the Roman Catholic parish of Abbeydorney, whose priest is the Very Reverend Denis O’Mahony and who takes services at Abbeydorney and Kilflynn.

The townland is in the parliamentary constituency of Kerry (since 2016), returning five TDs to Dáil Éireann.

== See also ==
- Civil parishes in Ireland
- Kilflynn
