= Knockbrack West, County Kerry =

Knockbrack West
- townland
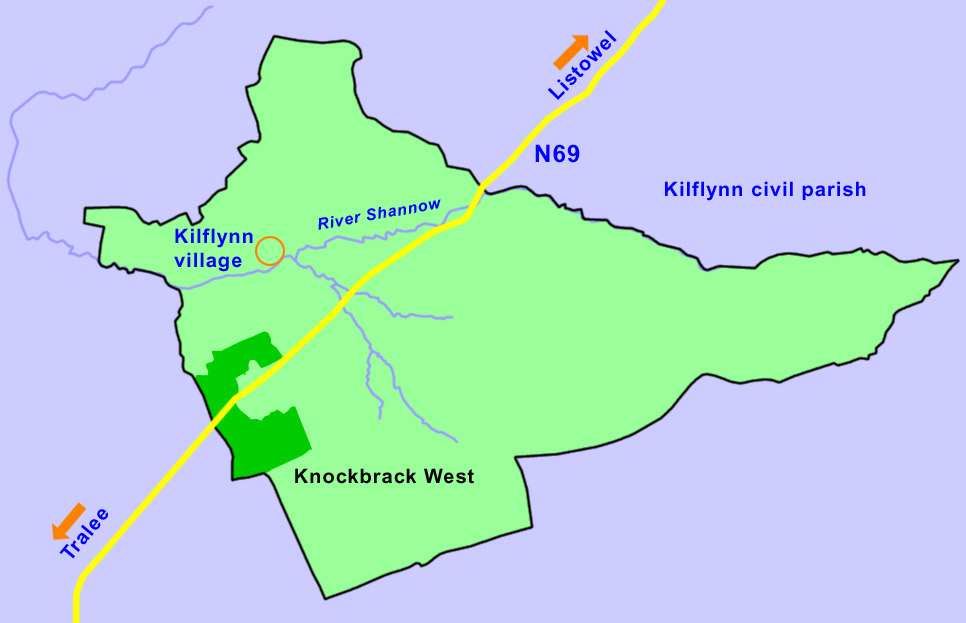

- Knockbrack West shown within Ireland
- Country: Ireland
- County: County Kerry
- Barony: Clanmaurice
- Civil parish: Kilflynn

Area
  - Total: 105.49 ha (260.7 acres)

Knockbrack West (Irish: An Cnoc Breac Thiar) is a townland of County Kerry, Ireland.

It is one of the sixteen original townlands of the civil parish of Kilflynn. It is traversed by the N69 Tralee-Listowel road. The area covers 105.49 hectares (260.67 acres) of rural land. It is partly forested (commercial) south of the N69.

== History ==
In 1641, Knockbrack West was described as "common and unprofitable land". Following the Act for the Settlement of Ireland in 1652, land held by supporters of the Catholic Confederation was forfeited. After the further Act of Settlement of 1662, Knockbrack West was granted to the following Protestant Cromwellian soldiers: Captain Henry Ponsonby (brother of Sir John Ponsonby), Lord King (a commissioner in the court of claims for Irish settlements), Henry Austin and Colonel Chidley Coote (son of Sir Charles Coote) in 1666. Ponsonby also received several other townlands solely in his name in the parish.

== Representation ==
Knockbrack West is in the Roman Catholic parish of Abbeydorney, whose priest is the Very Reverend Denis O'Mahony and who takes services at Abbeydorney and Kilflynn.

The townland is in the parliamentary constituency of Kerry (since 2016), returning five TDs to Dáil Éireann.

== See also ==
- Civil parishes in Ireland
- Kilflynn
