= Cloghaneleskirt, County Kerry =

Cloghaneleskirt Irish: Clothán leiscirt
- townland
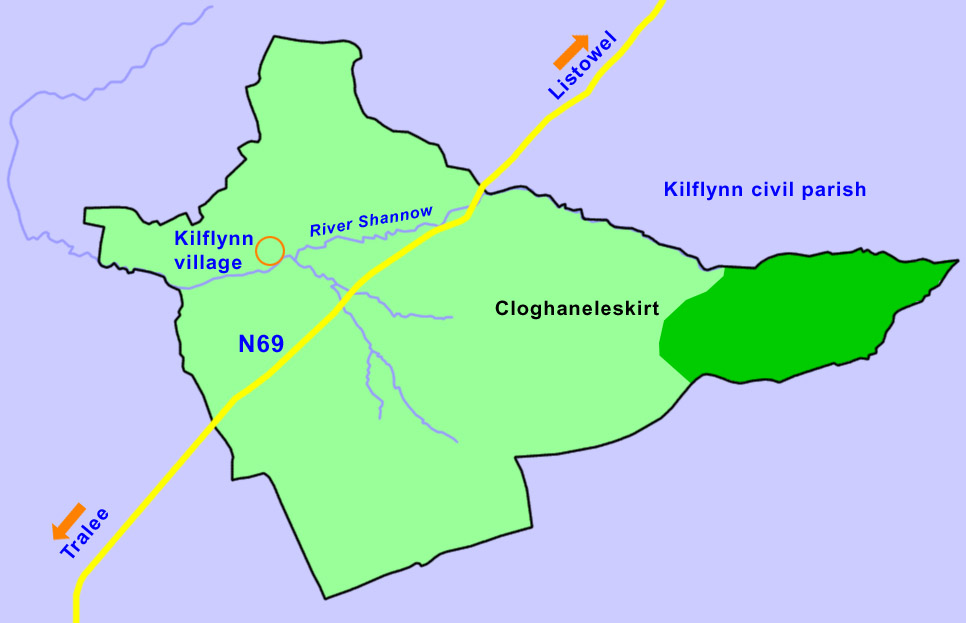

- Cloghaneleskirt shown within Ireland
- Country: Ireland
- County: County Kerry
- Barony: Clanmaurice
- Civil parish: Kilflynn

Area
  - Total: 348.44 ha (861.0 acres)

Cloghaneleskirt (Irish: Clothán leiscirt) is a townland of County Kerry, Ireland.

It is one of the sixteen original townlands of the civil parish of Kilflynn and is the most westerly of them. The north is partly bordered by a tributary of the Shannow river. The townland consists of rural land, some of it forested, with a large area having had turf cut from it for local fuel.

Immediately north of Cloghaneleskirt is the Pallas Wind Farm (or Clahane wind farm) which has 26 turbines with a nominal power of 53.8 megawatts.

== History ==
The Irish name has yet to be confirmed officially. There have been different anglicized spellings including Clahaneleskirt, Clahaneliskurt, and Clohanleskart. In the 1841 Ordnance Survey parish namebook it is noted as meaning 'south stony ford'. There is information from local people in the 1936 'Schools Collection' about the district as well as folk tales.

Cloghaneleskirt was originally owned by James Stack, of the Stack family common to the area and the eponymous mountain, mountain range and adjacent townland. He was a supporter of the Irish Rebellion of 1641 and the Catholic Confederation. As a result, his land was confiscated by Cromwell's forces after the Act for the Settlement of Ireland in 1652. It was granted to Henry Ponsonby (born 1620), a Cromwellian soldier, after the Act of Settlement of 1662.

== Representation ==
Cloghaneleskirt is in the Roman Catholic parish of Abbeydorney, whose priest is the Very Reverend Denis O’Mahony.

The local parliamentary constituency (since 2016) is Kerry, returning five Teachtaí Dála (TDs) to the Dáil Éireann. The current TDs are Norma Foley (Fianna Fáil), Pa Daly (Sinn Féin), Brendan Griffin (Fine Gael), Danny Healy-Rae (Independent) and Michael Healy-Rae (Independent).

== See also ==
- Kilflynn
- Civil parishes in Ireland
