= Knocknahila, County Kerry =

Knocknahila
- townland
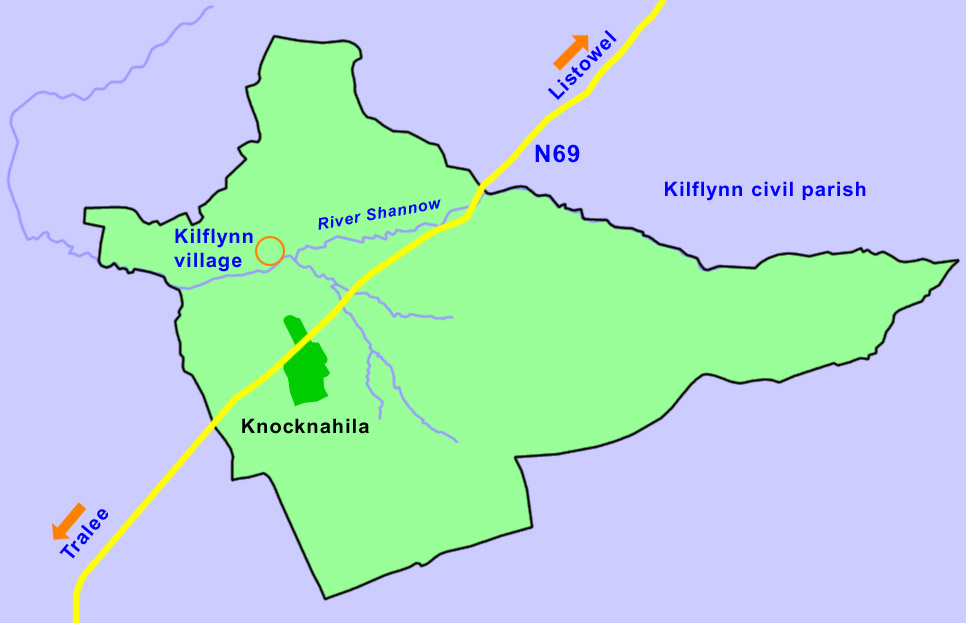

- Knocknahila shown within Ireland
- Coordinates: 52°20′19″N 9°37′10″W
- Country: Ireland
- County: County Kerry
- Barony: Clanmaurice
- Civil parish: Kilflynn

Knocknahila, is a townland of County Kerry, Ireland. It has no confirmed Irish translation.

It is one of the sixteen ancient townlands of the civil parish of Kilflynn. The area covers 35.95 hectares (88.83 acres) of largely rural land, crossed by the N69 Tralee-Listowel road.

== Archaeology and history ==
Knocknahila has two recognised archaeological sites, listed as a National Monuments, a well-defined ringfort with a stone-lined lime kiln and an enclosure which will require further research (Universal Transverse Mercator grid references, 29U 489599 621959 and 29U 489776 621791 respectively).

In 1641, Knocknahila was owned by Thomas Stack. The Stack family owned most of the townlands of the parish and some beyond. Following the Act for the Settlement of Ireland in 1652, land held by supporters of the Irish Rebellion of 1641 and the subsequent Catholic Confederation, was forfeited; this included the Stack's land. After the further Act of Settlement of 1662, Knocknahila was given to the Protestant Cromwellian soldier Captain Henry Ponsonby (brother of Colonel Sir John Ponsonby). Ponsonby also received several other townlands solely in his name in the parish.

== Representation ==
Knocknahila is in the Roman Catholic parish of Abbeydorney, whose priest is the Very Reverend Denis O’Mahony and who takes services at Abbeydorney and Kilflynn.

The townland is in the parliamentary constituency of Kerry (since 2016), returning five TDs to Dáil Éireann.

== See also ==
- Civil parishes in Ireland
- Kilflynn
