= Cappagh, County Kerry =

Cappagh Irish: An Cheapaigh
- townland
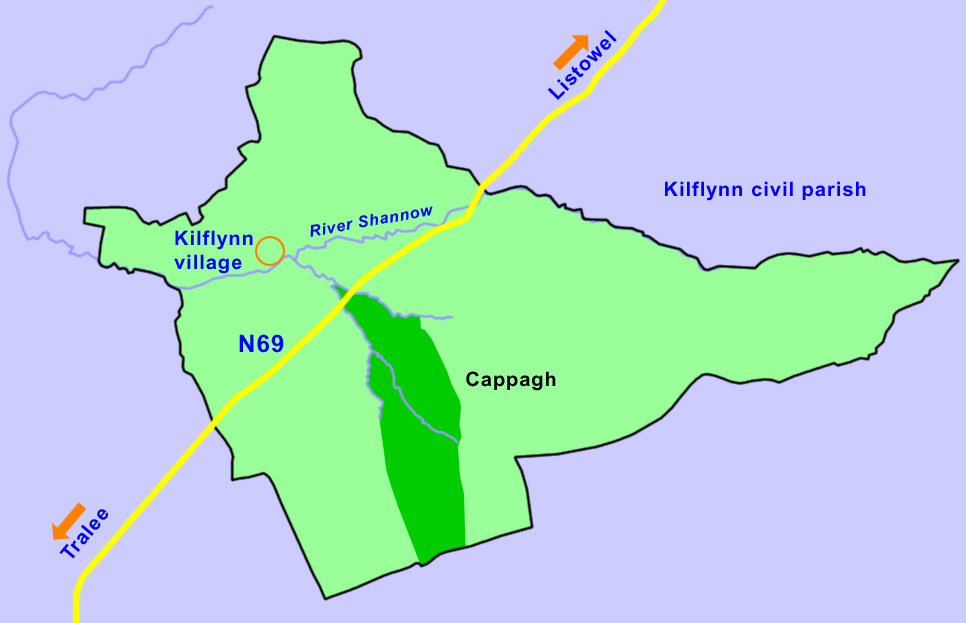

- Cappagh shown within Ireland
- Coordinates: 52.330°N 9.599°W
- Country: Ireland
- County: County Kerry
- Barony: Clanmaurice
- Civil parish: Kilflynn

Area
  - Total: 210 ha (520 acres)

Cappagh (Irish: An Cheapaigh) is a townland of County Kerry, Ireland.

It is one of the sixteen ancient townlands of the parish of Kilflynn. It consists of a strip of land lying in the middle of the parish extending to its southern border. The northern part is crossed by the N69 Tralee-Listowel road and the western boundary is partly the River Rea, a tributary of the Shannow river. The eastern border lies along the Cloonnafinneela road. The townland consists of 210 ha (520 acres) of largely rural land.

Immediately to the south of Cappagh stand the 31 turbines of the Tursillagh I and II wind farms, with a total nominal power of 22,080 megawatts.

== Archaeology and history ==
Cappagh has one recognised archaeological site listed as a National Monument, namely an enclosure at the UTM coordinates of 29U 490745 622153.

Cappagh was originally owned by Thomas Stack, of the Stack family whose name is well-established in the area. Because of his support for the Irish Rebellion of 1641 and the Catholic Confederation, his land was confiscated by Cromwell's forces after the Act for the Settlement of Ireland in 1652. In 1666, it was granted to Henry Ponsonby (born 1620), a soldier under Cromwell, according to the provisions of the Act of Settlement of 1662.

== Representation ==
Cappagh is in the Roman Catholic parish of Abbeydorney, whose priest is the Very Reverend Denis O’Mahony.

The local parliamentary constituency (since 2016) is Kerry, returning five Teachtaí Dála (T.D.s) to the Dáil Éireann. The current T.D.s are Norma Foley (Fianna Fáil), Pa Daly (Sinn Féin), Brendan Griffin (Fine Gael), Danny Healy-Rae (Independent) and Michael Healy-Rae (Independent).

== See also ==
- Kilflynn
- Civil parishes in Ireland
