= Cloonnafinneela, County Kerry =

Cloonnafinneela Irish: Cluain na Fionnaíle
- townland
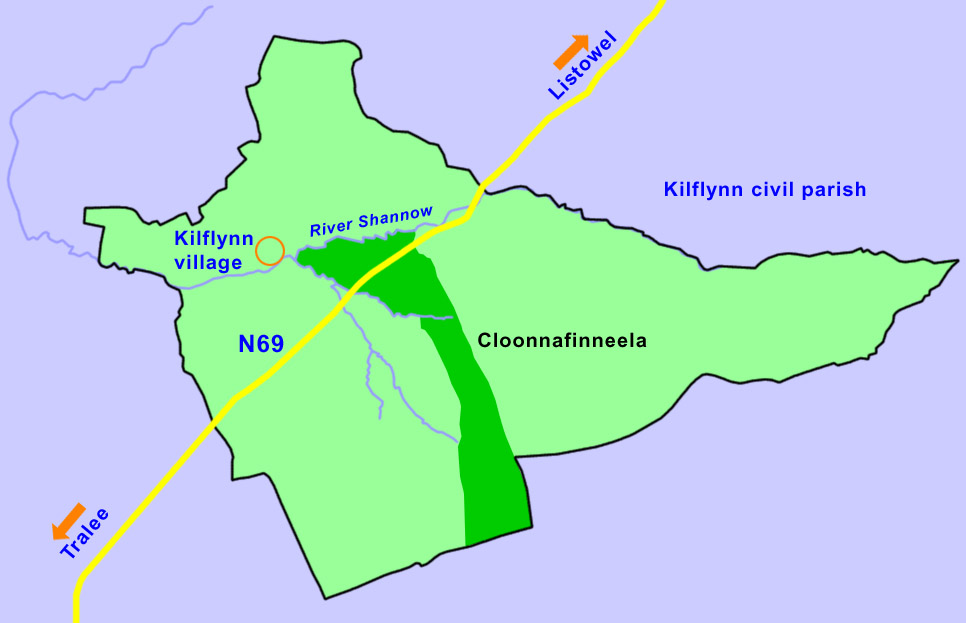

- Cloonnafinneela shown within Ireland
- Country: Ireland
- County: County Kerry
- Barony: Clanmaurice
- Civil parish: Kilflynn

Area
  - Total: 251.77 ha (622.1 acres)

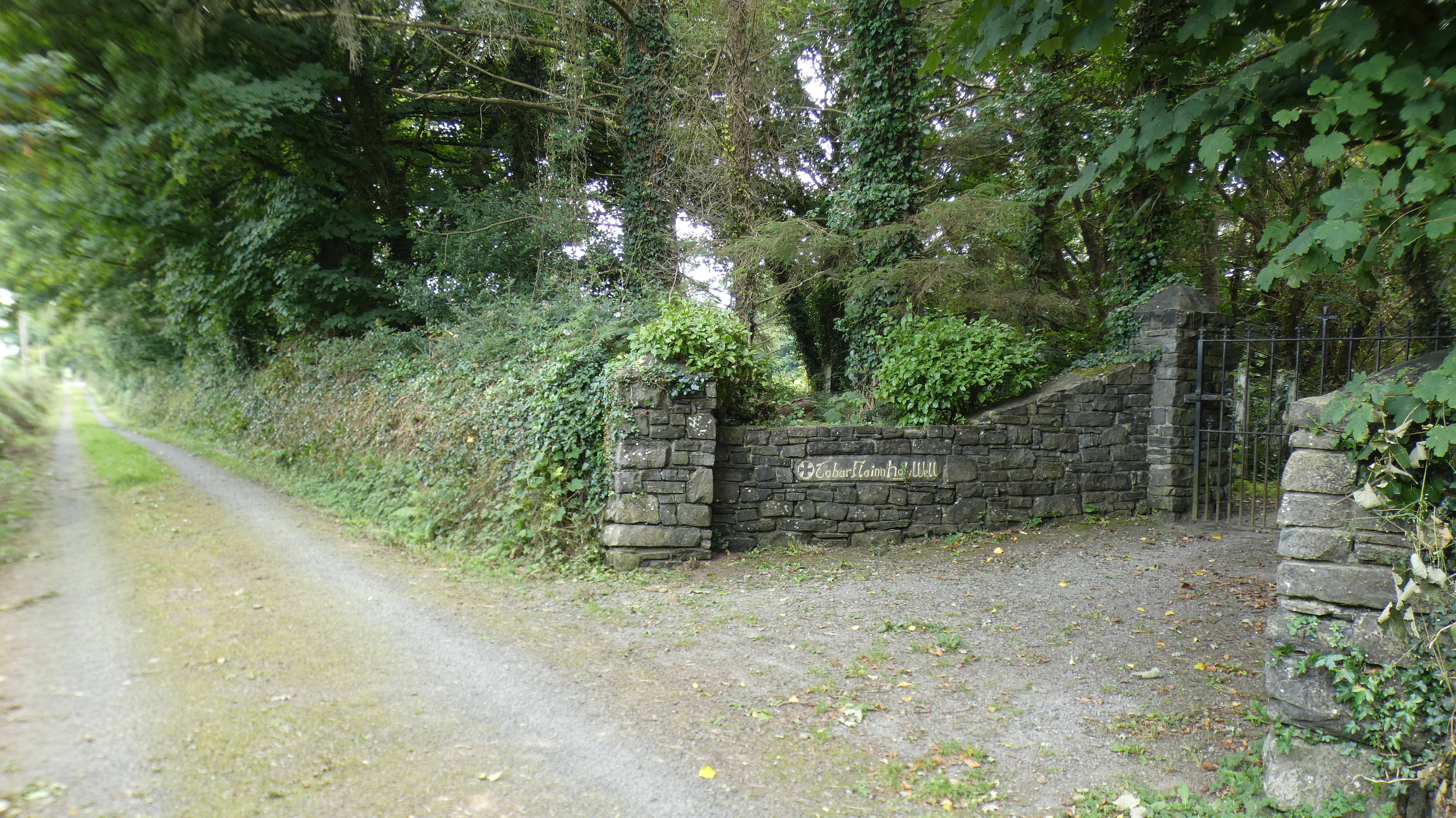
Road entrance to Tobar Flainn.

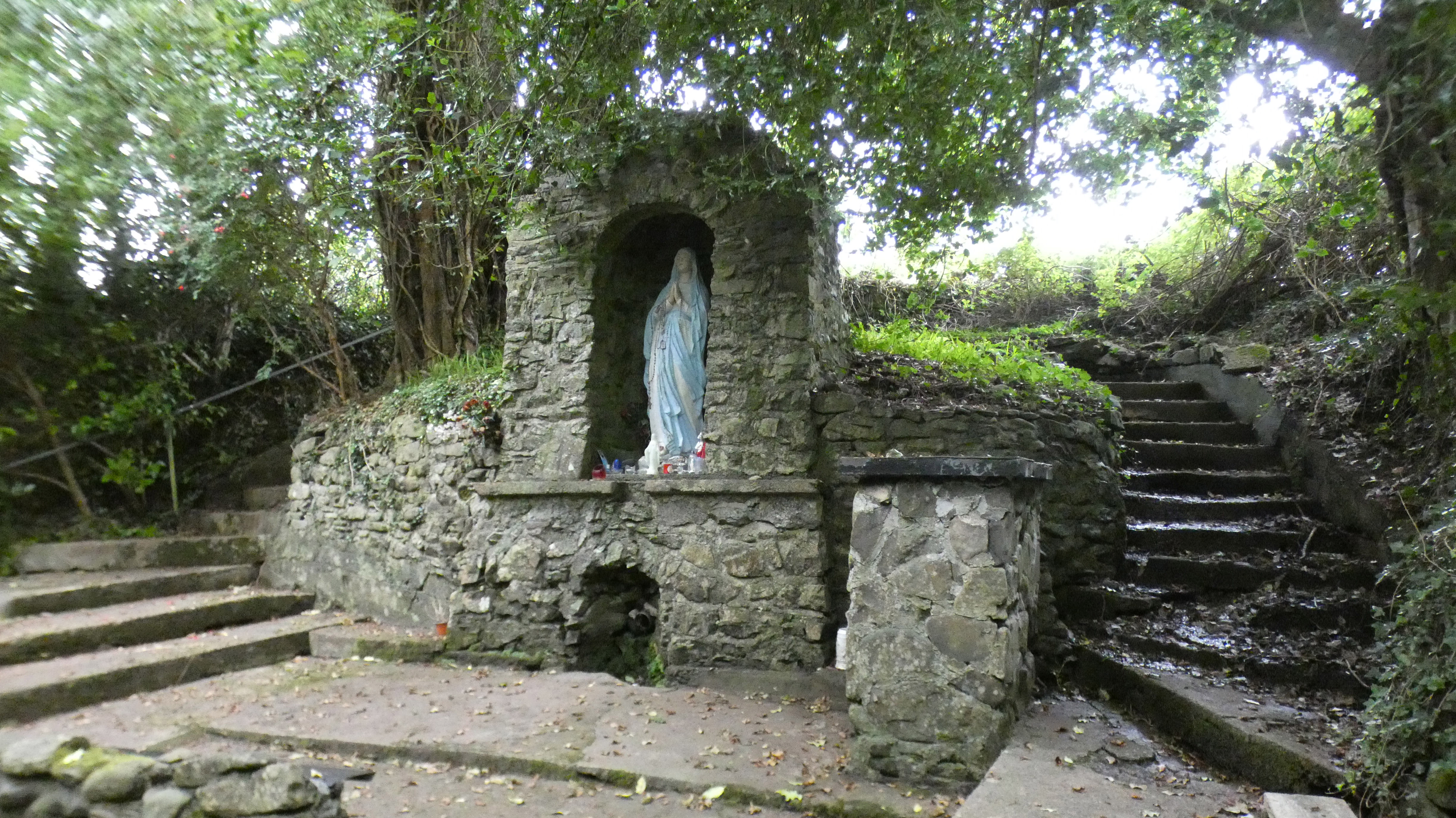
Tobar Flainn, the holy well of St.Flainn. The stonework was constructed by Muintir na Tíre in 1953. Spring water now channelled through the pipe below the statue formerly issued from a pile of stones by the Rae, the tributary that joins the Shannow.

Cloonnafinneela (Irish: Cluain na Fionnaíle) is a townland of County Kerry, Ireland.

It is one of sixteen ancient townlands of the civil parish of Kilflynn and lies roughly centrally. In the northern part it is crossed by the N69 Tralee-Listowel road, and it extends from Kilflynn town in the west to the Waterfall in the east, bordered by the Shannow and one of its tributaries. Thereafter the strip of land in a roughly north-south alignment follows the Cloonafinneela road as its western boundary.

== Archaeology, history and landscape ==
The well of the unknown 'St. Flainn' is a holy well visited to the present day in the townland. Listed as 'Toberflyn' (Irish: Tobar Flainn) on 1841 and 1892 Ordnance Survey maps, it is by a tributary of the Shannow river and east-south-east of Kilflynn centre. Stones lying nearby are said to be the remains of a hermitage, the ruined dwelling of the mysterious saint. The location is 29U 489992 623062 using the Universal Transverse Mercator(UTM) grid reference. The tale is that the crippled, blind man was visited by Holy Mary, who offered to restore his vision. He asked for the miracle of healing to be transferred to the well instead for others.

The Irish version of Cloonnafinneela is unvalidated; there have been a number of different anglicized spellings. Local folklore tells of a Fineela family which lived long ago in forts evident in the landscape. No one used the forts afterwards because people said it was not right to. The name was noted on the 1841 Ordnance Survey Parish namebook as 'lawn or meadow of the murder.' The forts mentioned are amongst sites listed as National Monuments, namely ringforts ((UTM grid references) 29U 490877 622381, 29U 490655 622325), enclosures (29U 490958 622925, 29U 490745 622153), earthworks (29U 491050 622962, 29U 491049 622963) and a possible fulacht fiadh (29U 490631 622331).

In 2011, plans for realignment of the N69 Tralee-Listowel road, which passes through Cloonnafinneela, gave archaeologists the opportunity to dig two test trenches (approx. UTM grid refs. 029 490143 622750, 029 490255 622861). At the first site, evidence was found of iron-working with familiar smelting waste products. Alder charcoal found there was carbon-dated to between 432 and 595 A.D. The second site yielded rare evidence for a (burned) thatched-roofed structure which included rushes, hazel, oak and willow amongst other plants. A sample of hazel charcoal was carbon-dated to between 1450 and 1635 A.D.

The townland was formerly the property of Thomas Stack, of the Stack family well-known to the area. He supported the Irish Rebellion of 1641 and the Catholic Confederation in the Irish Confederate Wars. His land was confiscated by Cromwell's forces following the Act for the Settlement of Ireland in 1652. In 1666, ownership was granted to Henry Ponsonby, a 46-year-old former soldier who fought in the New Model Army, after the Act of Settlement of 1662.

The townland rises moving southwards up Stack's Mountains. Two turbines of Tursillagh Wind Farm stand just within the southern boundary.

== Representation ==
Cloonnafinneela is in the Roman Catholic parish of Abbeydorney, whose priest is the Very Reverend Denis O’Mahony.

The local parliamentary constituency (since 2016) is Kerry, returning five Teachtaí Dála (T.D.s) to the Dáil Éireann. The current T.D.s are Norma Foley (Fianna Fáil), Pa Daly (Sinn Féin), Brendan Griffin (Fine Gael), Danny Healy-Rae (Independent) and Michael Healy-Rae (Independent).

== See also ==
- Civil parishes in Ireland
- Kilflynn
