= Castletown, County Kerry =

Castletown Irish: Baile an Chaisleáin
- townland
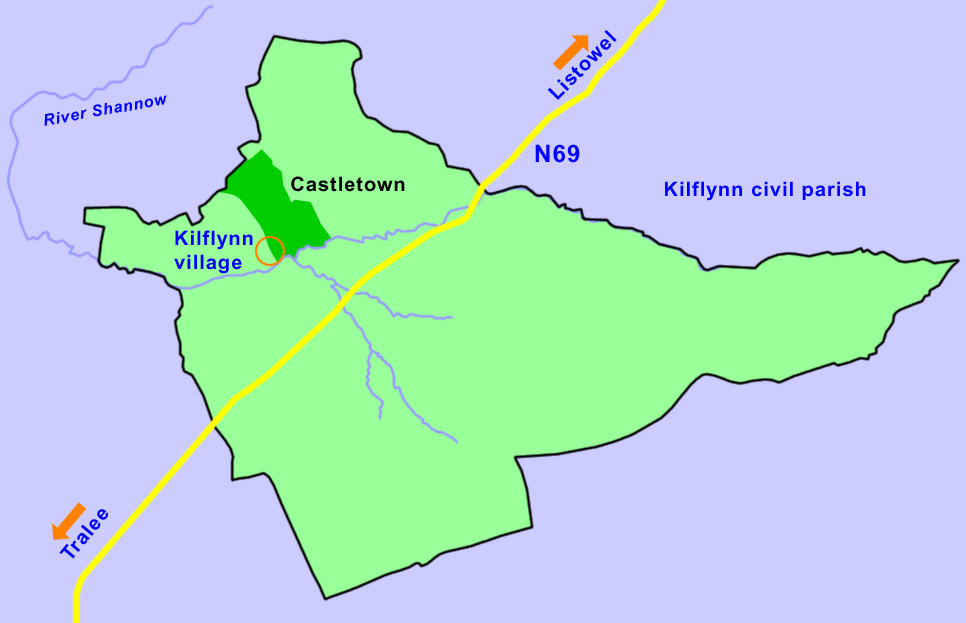

- Castletown shown within Ireland
- Country: Ireland
- County: County Kerry
- Barony: Clanmaurice
- Civil parish: Kilflynn

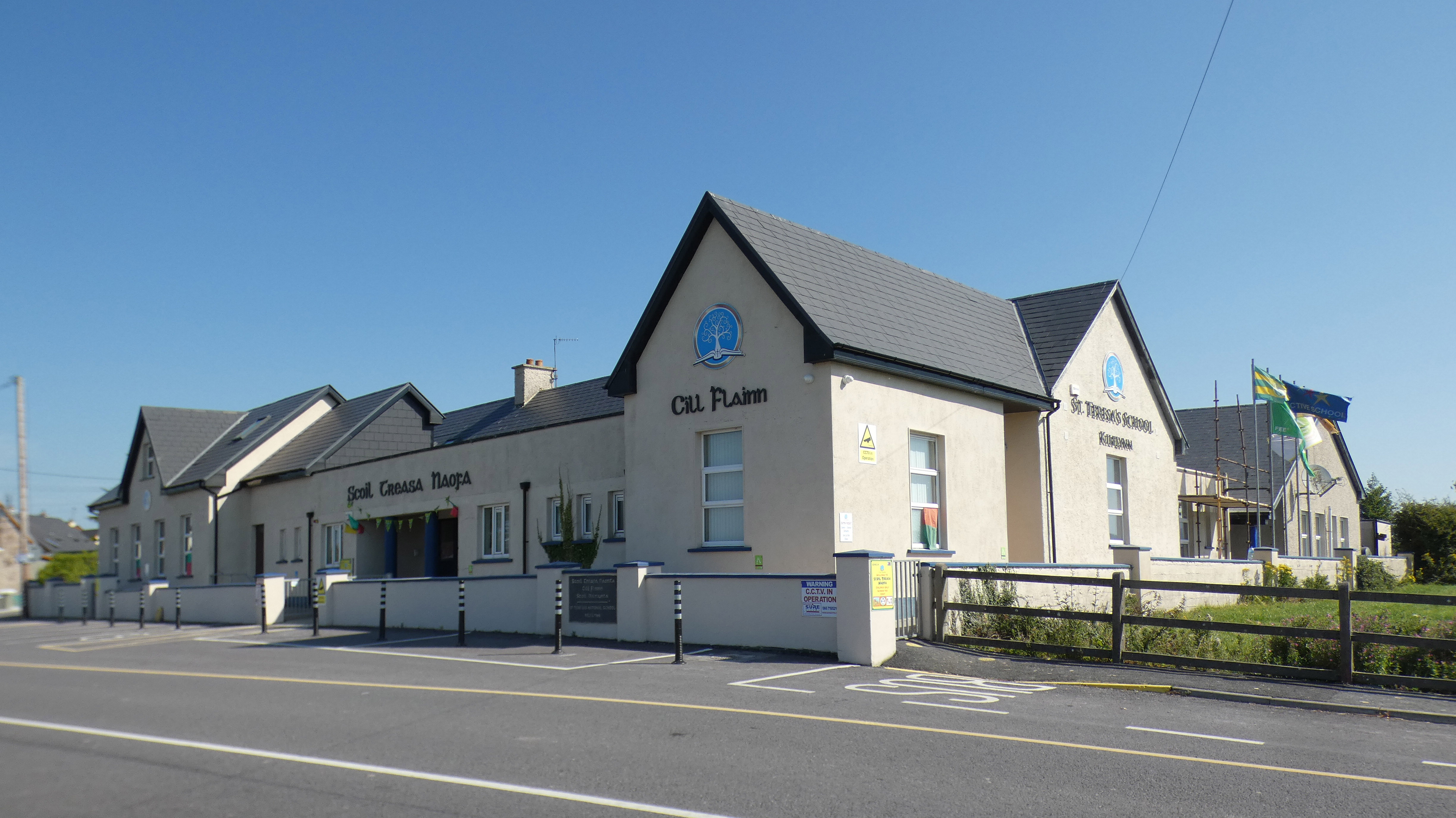
Scoil Treasa Naofa (St.Teresa's National School), Castletown.

Castletown, (Irish:Baile an Chaisleáin) is a townland of County Kerry, Ireland.

It is one of the sixteen ancient townlands of the civil parish of Kilflynn. Its southern border is formed by the river Shannow and its western by the Castletown road from Kilflynn Village. The area covers 73.58 hectares (181.81 acres) of rural and village land. Scoil Treasa Naofa (St.Teresa's National School), first sited in Castletown in 1821, is based there and serves the wider parish.

== History ==
Castletown contains six archaeological sites recognised as National Monuments: five are locations of ancient ring forts (Universal Transverse Mercator (UTM) grid references: 29U 489007 624035, 29U 489078 623865, 29U 489250 623891, 29U 489562 623833 and 29U 489880 623939) and one is the Roman Catholic church of St.Mary, protected as part of the National Inventory of Architectural Heritage (UTM grid reference: 29U 489293 623418).

Thomas Stack, of the Stack family which had its seat at Crotta, owned Castletown and neighbouring townlands. Because of their support for the Irish Rebellion of 1641 and the Catholic Confederation the Stacks' land was forfeited following the Act for the Settlement of Ireland in 1652. After the Act of Settlement of 1662, Castletown was handed to Henry Ponsonby in 1666. Ponsonby was a soldier, the brother of a colonel in Oliver Cromwell's New Model Army and one of many rewarded with Irish land for service.

== Representation ==
Castletown is in the Roman Catholic parish of Abbeydorney, whose priest is the Very Reverend Denis O’Mahony and who takes services at Abbeydorney and Kilflynn.

The townland is in the parliamentary constituency of Kerry (since 2016), returning five Teachtaí Dála (TDs) to Dáil Éireann.

== See also ==
- Civil parishes in Ireland
- Kilflynn
