= Stack's Mountains =

Range of hills in County Kerry, Ireland

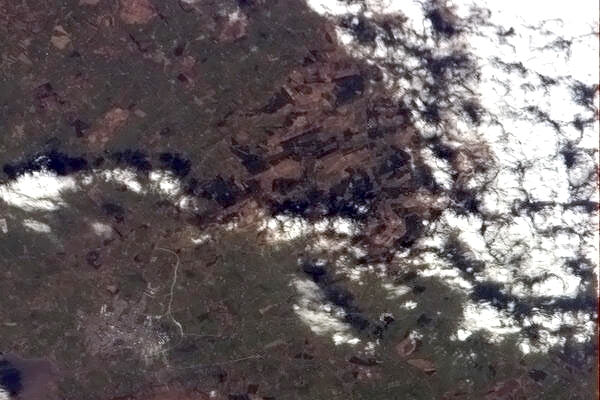
- The Stack's Mountains from the International Space Station, with Tralee at bottom left.

Highest point
- Peak: Crusline
- Elevation: 355 m (1,165 ft)
- Coordinates: 52.318779°N 9.589144°W

Geography
- Country: Ireland
- Provinces of Ireland: Munster

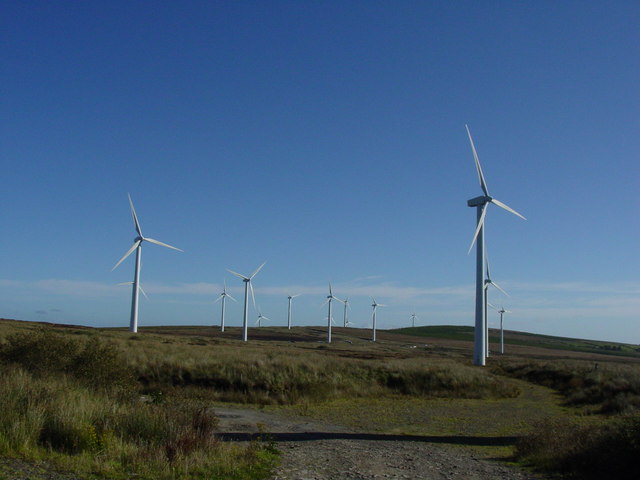
A wind farm on Stack's Mountain in the Stack's Mountains.

The Stack's Mountains are a range of hills northeast of Tralee in County Kerry, Ireland. Traditionally they are deemed part of the hilly region known as Sliabh Luachra (anglicised 'Slieve Logher'), which also includes the Mullaghareirk Mountains.

The highest peak in the range is Crusline, which is 355 metres high. Nearby summits include Ballincollig Hill (353 m), Beennageeha Mountain (321 m), and Stack's Mountain (Irish: Cnoc an Stacaigh; 323 m).

== Landscape and nature ==
The range is characterised by moorland and limited open pasture, with 4,700 hectares of young coniferous forest plantations of mainly Sitka spruce – with Japanese larch, pines, firs and cedars, along with some broadleaved trees such as birch, ash, alder, oak, willow, sycamore, and holly – most managed by the forest management company, Coillte.

The local conifer forests, open heather moors, and grassland are habitats for fauna such as the hen harrier, Irish hare, red fox, red grouse, snipe, cuckoo, and meadow pipit. The neighbouring Glanaruddery Mountains to the southeast are divided from the Stack's Mountains by the valley of the Smearlagh River.

== Energy resources ==
The peat company, Bord na Móna, extracted about 250,000 tons of turf for fuel from Lyracrumpane Bog between 1938 and 1963. Nowadays, turf is harvested by local people under turbary arrangements, using hopper machines instead of the traditional slane. There are also wind farms on Stack's Mountain and Ballincollig Hill.

== Recreation ==
The Lyracrumpane Development Association in cooperation with Coillte have created the four-mile "Mass Path and River Walk" along the banks of the Smearlagh River, and the ten mile "Fionn MacCumhaill" trek through open countryside and Coillte forest plantations.

The seven-mile Smearlagh River, which is a tributary of the River Feale, is formed in the Stack's Mountains and Glanaruddery Mountains from the Broghane Stream, Dromaddamore River, Glashoreag River, and Lyracrumpane River. The Smearlagh meets the Feale at Inchymagilleragh, three miles east of Listowel, where the confluence is known as "The Joinings". The Smearlagh is a swift river that provides good salmon and sea trout fishing.
