= Patrick O'Shea =

Irish republican soldier

Patrick O'Shea (c.1900 - 18 April 1923) was a farm labourer and IRA soldier who fought on the anti-Treaty side during the Irish Civil War in north Kerry. He died after falling from a cliff trying to escape from Irish Free State forces in a siege at Clashmealcon (Irish: Clais Maolchon) in the last major military action of the civil war.

== Life ==
He was the eldest son of Patrick O'Shea, a farmer. He lived at Ballinbranig, Ballyduff.

He served with the IRA in the 3rd Battalion, 1st Kerry Brigade, under the command of Michael Laid and John McElligott. Post-Treaty, he was part of "Aero" Lyons's flying column that operated around Ballyduff (on different historical documentation he is recorded as having commenced IRA activities either from 1917, 1920 or 1921). Amongst other actions, the column had robbed the post office at Ballyduff and attacked the Civic Guard station at Ballyheigue. On 15 April 1923, they attacked a National Army party which was involved in a raid. The National troops then pursued the column, gaining reinforcements from the 1st Western Division led by Michael Hogan. O'Shea and his colleagues entered Dumfort's Cave set into the Atlantic cliff, a hiding place with one entrance and no means of escape. A siege followed, lasting more than three days, in which National troops detonated mines and tried to smoke the column out with devices made on the spot. James McGrath, O'Shea's first cousin and brother to his IRA colleague Thomas McGrath who was trapped with him, was arrested by the National Army and taken to the caves to try to effect a surrender. Two National troops were shot by Lyons as they tried to access the cave, one dying at the scene and another, Captain Henry Pearson, succumbing to his injuries in Tralee hospital. On the night of 17–18 April. O'Shea and his cousin Tom McGrath made an attempt to escape by leaving the cave and scaling the cliff. They both fell into the sea and drowned and their bodies were never found. Three of O'Shea's colleagues, James McEnery, Edmond Greaney and "Rudge" Hathaway surrendered and were later executed. The siege ended after Lyons agreed to surrender but fell from a rope provided by troops onto rocks and was riddled with bullets where he lay.

O'Shea's father, Patrick, was awarded £12 from the Irish White Cross because of his son's death. With new legislation passed in the early 1930s, and further Army Pension legislation, he applied for an allowance for dependency on his son, as did O'Shea's brother John, and the latter with O'Shea's other sibling Michael seeking a final payment when their father died. This involved representation from Eamon Kissane, Teachta Dála (for Kerry and then North Kerry) and included discussion about the absence of a coroner's inquest (before 1924, inquests were not held without a body) and exceeding time limits for applications. Correspondence lasted until 1959. Only O'Shea's father was successful with his allowance application, receiving a partial dependency award, but died during the period covered by it between 1941 and 1942.
