= Thomas McGrath (Irish Republican) =

Irish republican soldier

Thomas McGrath (9 January 1903 - 18 April 1923) was an IRA soldier who fought on the anti-Treaty side in the Irish Civil War in north Kerry. He drowned after trying to escape a siege by Irish Free State forces at Clashmealcon during what was the last major military action of the War.

He was born at home to Mary (née Walsh) and Peter McGrath and lived at 13 Clashmealcon (Irish: Clais Maolchon), County Kerry. Before the Anglo-Irish Treaty, he served as a Fianna Scout from 1919 to 1921. Post-Treaty, he was a member of the IRA until his death in the 3rd Battalion, Kerry No.1 Brigade. He fought in "Aeroplane" Lyons's flying column, which was based around Causeway and was involved in the robbery of the Ballyduff post office and the burning of a Civic Guard station at Ballyheigue. On 15 April, the column launched an attack on a National Army raiding party at Meenoghane. Reinforcements to the party came relatively quickly from the 1st Western Division led by Michael Hogan. Lyons's fighters were followed to the Atlantic cliffs at Clashmealcon, where they chose to hide in Dumfort's Cave, with its single entrance so no possibility of escape. On 16 April, James McGrath - Thomas's elder brother and also an 'Irregular' - was arrested and taken to the caves in order to persuade the men to give up. Lyons, who had fired at the troops' lights, shot two National soldiers who tried to enter the cave - one was killed at the spot and another died later in Tralee hospital. Three of the group, Edmond Greaney, James McEnery and "Rudge" Hathaway surrendered and were beaten before being removed to Ballymullen Barracks where they were later executed. On the night of 17–18 April, McGrath, with his colleague and first cousin Patrick O'Shea, made a futile attempt to escape by climbing the cliff. Both men fell into the sea and drowned; their bodies were never recovered and no death certificates were issued. Later on 18 April, Lyons fell from a rope (provided by National troops) and landed on the rocks below where he was shot many times and left.

In 2013, documents released as part of the Military Service Pensions Collection show that in the 1930s, McGrath's father, Peter, applied for an allowance from the army pensions board claiming dependency on his son, stating in one document that his son was "murdered". Despite a lot of correspondence, his application was unsuccessful as it was determined his means were above the threshold. McGrath's sister, Mary Ann, also applied for an allowance claiming dependency. Her application contained representations from Patrick Finucane, Teachta Dála for North Kerry. She was granted a partial dependency award and family correspondence regarding the claim continued until 1975, after her death.
