= George O'Shea =

Irish republican soldier

- Born: 1 January 1897 Kilflynn, County Kerry, Ireland
- Died: 7 March 1923 (aged 26) Ballyseedy, County Kerry, Ireland
- Branch: Kerry No.1 Brigade, 2nd Battalion
- Rank: captain

George O'Shea (1897 - 1923) was an Irish Republican Army (IRA) soldier who fought with the Anti-Treaty side during the Irish Civil War. He was one of eight men killed by Free State forces in the Ballyseedy Massacre, a defining event in Irish history.

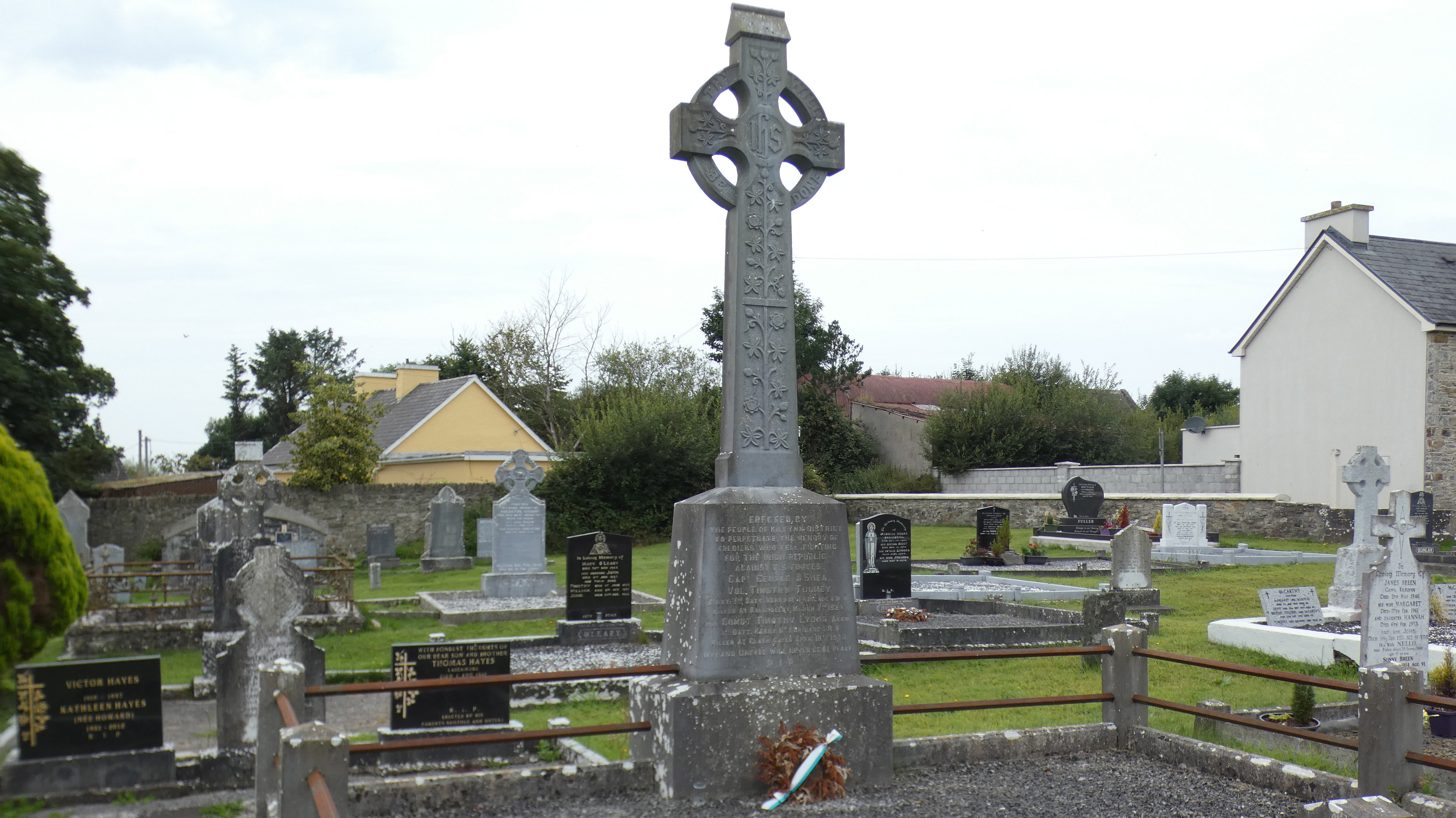
The Republican plot in Kilflynn village where George O'Shea was buried alongside Timothy Tuomey and Timothy Lyons

== Biography ==
O'Shea was born to Anne and John O'Shea in Fahavane, a townland of Kilflynn, County Kerry. He lived at No.1 Fahavane. His father was a farmer.

In May 1920, he was nominated for and elected to the Tralee Rural District Council for the Ratass area. He served in the Kilflynn IRA during the War of Independence as captain of the Kerry No.1 Brigade, 2nd Battalion. After the War of Independence, he continued to fight against Free State forces thereafter. Military Archives from the 1930s show his name amongst hand-written notes regarding state pension provision.

He was found by Free State troops from Lixnaw, who found him three miles south of Kilflynn, hiding in a dugout at "Loughnane's quarry", in late February 1923. He was with Stephen Fuller and John Shanahan - both lifelong Fahavane neighbours and friends - and Timothy Tuomey. After being taken to Lixnaw they were put in Ballymullen Barracks, Tralee by the recently arrived Dublin Guard where, reported by Fuller, they were tortured by the intelligence section (under the command of David Neligan) and later moved to the workhouse of the other barracks in Tralee. Shortly after, on 6 March, five Free State soldiers were killed by a booby-trapped bomb at Baranarigh Wood, Knocknagoshel. Amongst the dead were long-standing colleagues of Major General Paddy O'Daly, G.O.C. Kerry Command. Prisoners had been beaten after the killings and Daly ordered that republican prisoners should remove mines. On the morning of 7 March, O'Shea, Fuller, Shanahan, Tuomey and five other prisoners from Ballymullen Barracks - all selected by Neligan - were taken in a lorry to Ballyseedy Cross. There, they were secured to each other by legs and hands in a circle round a landmine whose construction was supervised by two senior Dublin Guard officers. The prisoners continued their prayers and goodbyes as the troops retreated. According to the sole survivor, Stephen Fuller - his lieutenant - O'Shea uttered the group's final words "goodbye lads" before the mine was detonated remotely at some time past 3 a.m. The majority of the remains were put in nine prepared coffins. The event was witnessed by a local, Rita O'Donnell, who also saw the uncleared remains later that morning, spread about the greenery. More reprisals followed soon after Ballyseedy.

Seriously injured, Fuller escaped into hiding. Later the same day as the murders, Paddy Daly authorised the release of the coffins. Angry relatives came with carts and placed the remains in their own coffins while a band was reportedly playing. On 8 June, an army statement was released claiming two mined barricades (a similar event happened at Countess bridge, Killarney) exploded while being dismantled by prisoners accompanied by Dublin Guard troops and that all prisoners were killed and five troops injured. The dead prisoners' names were published as part of the cover-up. The story was then hastily changed when it was realised Fuller was missing. O'Shea's death record, reported by his mother, cites the cause as "Shock and haemorrhage, fractured skull caused by mine explosion. No medical attendance." Subsequent contrary reports to the official line about the killings came from Cumann na mBan, Free State Lieutenants Niall Harrington and W. McCarthy and the Garda Síochána, but were all ignored; the latter report was only made public in the 1980s.

O'Shea was buried in a Republican plot at Kilflynn Church (now St. Columba's Heritage Centre) with two colleagues, Timothy Tuomey (of Gortclohy) - also killed at Ballyseedy - and Timothy Lyons (of Garrynagore) who was killed at Clashmealcon Caves a few weeks after Ballyseedy.
