= Fahavane, County Kerry =

Fahavane Irish: An Fhaiche Bhán
- townland
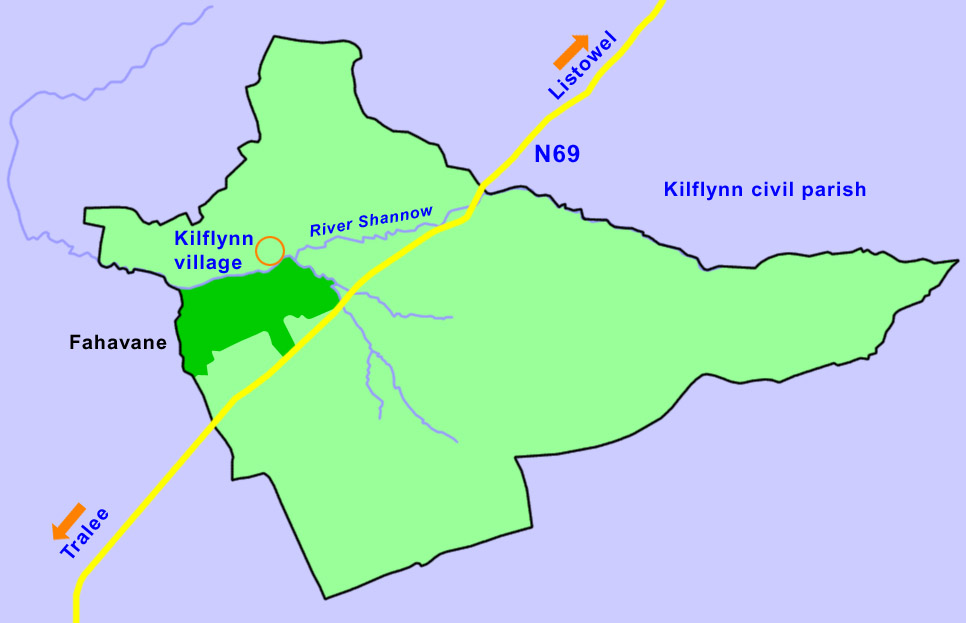

- Fahavane shown within Ireland
- Coordinates: 52.3436°N 9.6305°W
- Country: Ireland
- County: County Kerry
- Barony: Clanmaurice
- Civil parish: Kilflynn

Area
  - Total: 144.90 ha (358.1 acres)

Fahavane (Irish: An Fhaiche Bhán) is a townland of County Kerry, Ireland.

It is one of the sixteen original townlands of the civil parish of Kilflynn and is on the east side, just south of the river Shannow, which provides its northern border, and Kilflynn village. It is mostly rural land.

== History ==
Fahavane was listed as common or unprofitable land in 1641 and again in 1670 after the Down survey. Most surrounding townlands were owned by the Stack family, whose name is common to the area. Stack family members lost their land to Henry Ponsonby, a Cromwellian soldier, because of their support for the Irish Rebellion of 1641 and the Catholic Confederation.

In modern history, the most famous people from Fahavane were George O'Shea and Stephen Fuller, former Republican soldiers. Fuller later became the Teachta Dála for North Kerry representing Fianna Fáil in the 9th and 10th Dáil Éireann. He was the sole survivor of the notorious Ballyseedy massacre of 7 March 1923, where he, O'Shea and seven other Republican prisoners of the Free State army were tied standing in a circle around a land mine which was prepared and detonated by officers of the Dublin Guard. O'Shea and Timothy Twomey, also from the Kilflynn civil parish, are buried in the Republican plot in Kilflynn.

== Religion ==
Fahavane is in the Roman Catholic parish of Abbeydorney, whose priest is the Very Reverend Denis O’Mahony.

== Representation ==
The local parliamentary constituency (since 2016) is Kerry, returning five Teachtaí Dála (TDs) to the Dáil Éireann. The current TDs are John Brassil (Fianna Fáil), Martin Ferris (Sinn Féin), Brendan Griffin (Fine Gael), Danny Healy-Rae (Independent) and Michael Healy-Rae (Independent).

== See also ==
- Kilflynn
- Civil parishes in Ireland
- Stephen Fuller
