= Kathleen O'Brennan =

Irish journalist, playwright and campaigner

- Born: 20 November 1876; Dublin, Ireland

Kathleen O'Brennan (20 November 1876 – 1948) was an Irish campaigner for Irish independence in the US, a journalist and a playwright.

== Early life ==
Catherine Mary Brennan was born 20 November 1876, the daughter of Francis Brennan, auctioneer, and his wife, Elizabeth Anne Butler, while they lived in 11 South Richmond Street, Dublin. They reclaimed the 'O' of their name at a time when many Irish families were returning to the 'Mac' or 'O' version that had been unrecognised for a century. Her sister Áine O'Brennan married Éamonn Ceannt and her younger sister Lily O'Brennan was a writer and playwright. Her father died in 1880, her mother in 1930. O'Brennan was a journalist and playwright. She was appointed Dublin correspondent to the London Times and went on to submit work regularly to the Irish Times and the Irish Tatler.

== American life ==
While Lily and Áine were involved directly in the Easter Rising in 1916, O'Brennan was in the United States. She didn't let her absence from Dublin prevent her from working hard to ensure the success of Ireland's bid for independence.

According to research by historian Catherine M Burns, O'Brennan arrived in America in October 1914 and stayed there for longer than expected due to the difficulty of transatlantic travel during the First World War. Working as a journalist and lecturer, O'Brennan traveled to California and Oregon and spoke to women's organisations as an authority on the Gaelic league and Irish art and culture.

Her lectures included details she got from her sisters and photos of Éamonn Ceannt and his son, Rónán.

While on the US West Coast, O'Brennan's ties to the Industrial Workers of the World (IWW) brought her to the attention of the US authorities, who tracked her movements and associations. She became involved in the IWW through Dr Marie Equi, with whom she had a romantic relationship. When Equi was arrested, O'Brennan worked to see her released and continued to agitate until her own arrest in 1919 during the Red Scare. The US government issued a deportation order for O'Brennan, but it was not enforced. During this period, O'Brennan founded the Women's Irish Education League in San Francisco in May 1919.

O'Brennan moved to the US East Coast in 1920. As Burns finds, after an "American women" picketing venture demanding US recognition of the Irish Republic was organised by William J Maloney in Washington, DC in April 1920, O'Brennan, Gertrude Kelly and Gertrude Corless founded the American Women Pickets for the Enforcement of America's War Aims in New York City.

Burns argues that the organisation used American identity as a tool to shield O'Brennan's identity and to mask the radicalism of the women's cause by tying support for the Irish Republic to historical memory of the American Revolution. According to Burns, during the April 1920 picketing O'Brennan took advantage of her position as the pickets' press connection to ensure that names other than her own, such as Kathleen Glennon, Maurya O'Brannon and Kathleen Butler appeared in press reports about the pickets, concealing her identity in the face of the deportation order that might be enforced were she to be seen as associated with militant women's activism for the Irish Republic.

Burns maintains that after picket Helen Golden challenged their leadership by publicly designating the women pickets loyal to O'Brennan, Kelly, and Corless as Irish, rather than American. O'Brennan and Kelly then formed an American auxiliary to the Irish White Cross.

Fearful that the Irish republican movement in the United States might be perceived as Irish-run, radical, and un-American, Harry Boland opposed their efforts. He and Éamon de Valera attacked O'Brennan, deeming her and Kelly as too un-American to work for the benefit of the as yet unrecognised Irish Republic in the United States. The women refused to take orders from de Valera, sealing their fate. O'Brennan departed to Canada on a lecture tour in July 1921 and by June 1922 was living back in Dublin.

During the Irish Civil War, de Valera used O'Brennan's socialist reputation to approach Soviet foreign minister Georgy Chicherin while in Switzerland. The contact was hoped to provide finance and munitions but was unsuccessful.

== Later life ==
O'Brennan's play Full Measure premiered in the Abbey Theatre in 1928. She was secretary to the Irish PEN.

Her personal papers are held in the National Library of Ireland along with those of other members of her family including Éamonn Ceannt, his wife Áine and her sister Lily.

She is buried in Dean's Grange Cemetery with her sister Lily.
