= Gertrude Kelly =

Irish-American surgeon and activist (1862–1934)

Gertrude B. Kelly
- Born: Gertrude Bride Kelly; 10 February 1862; Carrick-on-Suir, Ireland
- Died: 24 February 1934 (aged 71–72); New York, United States
- Occupation: Surgeon

Gertrude Bride Kelly (10 February 1862 – 24 February 1934) was a New York City surgeon and suffragette, labour and social activist, Irish independence supporter, and anarchist.

== Early life ==
Gertrude B. Kelly was born Brigid Kelly on February 10, 1862 in Carrick-on-Suir, Ireland to teachers Jeremiah Kelly and Kate Forrest Kelly. To her friends, she was known as Bride. She emigrated with her family to the United States in 1868, settling in Hoboken, New Jersey. Her father went back into teaching in the public school system, becoming a principal of a New Jersey school in 1872. In New Jersey, both of her parents were active in the Land League. Her father was the president of the Jersey City branch of the Land League.

Her older brother was electrical engineer John Forrest Kelly.

After graduating from high school, Kelly studied medicine in the Women's Medical College of the New York Infirmary for Women and Children, graduating in 1884 and went on to practice as a doctor. Despite being in America, Kelly remained interested in the situation in Ireland and her work in the tenements gave her insight into the lives of the poor.

== Activism ==
An individualist anarchist in the 1880s, Kelly published frequent articles in the periodicals Liberty and the Irish World. She was the foremost woman contributor to Liberty and hugely praised by the editor Benjamin Tucker. She was a member of the Ladies' Land League in America. She believed in the No Rent Manifesto published by the Irish National Land League in 1881. She was also a supporter of freedom for other nations – she was a member of the Friends of Freedom for India and Friends of New Russia.

Her main local causes were in support of women and poor families. She founded a medical clinic in Chelsea as well as being on the surgical staff at the New York Infirmary for Women and Children for over 30 years. She was also secretary of the Newark Liberal League. She wrote numerous papers on surgical and medical procedures, and on social health issues.

One of her main objections was with capitalism, which she believed caused the poverty she saw. She spoke against the practices of teaching women embroidery and art rather than making them self-sufficient. She saw herself as an anarchist in the beginning but began to identify as a socialist in later years.

In her writings she made statements which were rare for a feminist of the day. She made the point, "There is, properly speaking, no woman question, apart from the question of human rights and human liberty".

Kelly was an atheist who referred to herself as an unredeemed pagan. She never married but lived with her companion Mary Walsh.

== The Irish Nationalism ==
Kelly claimed to have been a member of almost every Irish association in New York. She was the only female patron of the Gaelic Society in New York and served as the chairwoman of the 1913 Irish Historic Pageant. When a supporter of Irish Home Rule and the United Irish League of America, she organized the United Irishwomen when it looked as though Ulster might be excluded from the Third Irish Home Rule Bill in 1914. In December of that year, Kelly and Irish journalist Sidney Gifford formed the first American auxiliary to the Cumann na mBan, more commonly known as the Irish Women's Council. She was president of the association and arranged new chapters around the country as well as arranging speakers and fundraising. She did not support Irish Volunteer leader John Redmond's move to support the British armed forces in the First World War. Kelly was also pacifist who believed in non-violent protests. She was arrested during an anti-war demonstration during the war. In 1917 she co-founded the Irish Progressive League (IPL). During the war, organisations which criticized British policy were put on the government watch list. As a result of the members of the earlier organisations being listed, the IPL believed they were better positioned to lobby for the Irish Republic in Washington.

Kelly was one of the organizers of the American Women Pickets for the Enforcement of America's War Aims which protested at the British Embassy in Washington in 1920. They also organized a strike at Chelsea Piers, which lasted three and a half weeks, in protest of the British Prime Minister's actions in relation to Irish Archbishop Daniel Mannix and the arrest of the Cork Mayor Terence MacSwiney. The strike spread to Brooklyn, New Jersey, and Boston and included Irish, Italian, and African-American workers. The strike at Chelsea Piers was termed "the first purely political strike of workingmen in the history of the United States" by The New York Sun.

In January 1921, Kelly and Kathleen O'Brennan formed an American branch of the Irish White Cross.

== Legacy ==
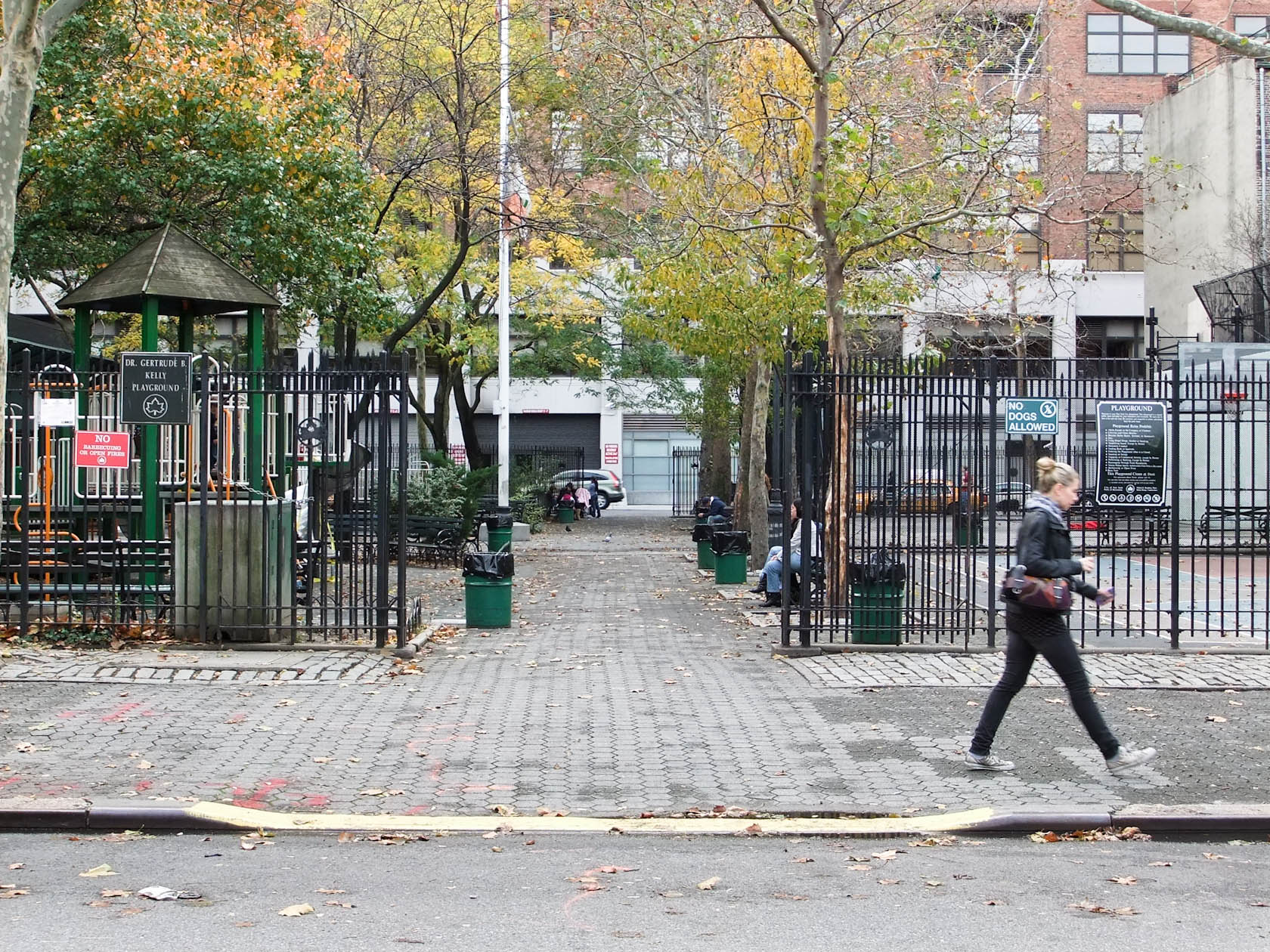
Dr. Gertrude B. Kelly Playground

Kelly died on 24 February 1934. Two years later, on 16 May 1936, New York Mayor Fiorello H. La Guardia dedicated a playground to her in the Chelsea district, the Dr. Gertrude B. Kelly Playground.
