= Stephen Fuller =

Irish politician (1900–1984)

Teachta Dála
- In office July 1937 – June 1943
- Constituency: Kerry North

Personal details
- Born: 1 January 1900 Kilflynn, County Kerry, Ireland
- Died: 23 February 1984 (aged 84) Tralee, County Kerry, Ireland
- Party: Fianna Fáil

Stephen Fuller (1 January 1900 – 23 February 1984) was an Irish Fianna Fáil politician who served as a Teachta Dála (TD) for the Kerry North constituency from 1937 to 1943.

== Early life ==
Fuller was born in Kilflynn, County Kerry, in 1900. He was the son of Ellie Quinlan and Daniel Fuller. His family was from Fahavane, in the parish of Kilflynn.

== War of Independence and the Civil War ==
Fuller served in the Kilflynn IRA flying column during the War of Independence. He was 1st Lieutenant in the Kerry No.1 Brigade, 2nd Battalion. Fuller opposed the Anglo-Irish Treaty and continued to fight with the anti-Treaty IRA during the Irish Civil War. Military records from the 1930s show, in his own hand, that he was in communication with Dublin regarding confirmation of membership in July 1922 and therefore eligibility for war pensions (Fuller became the most senior Kilflynn member upon the death of Captain George O'Shea).

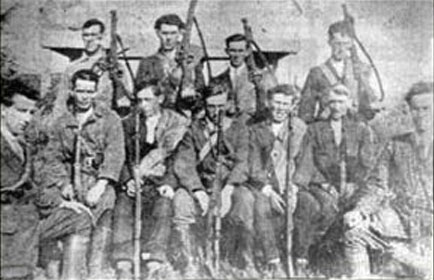
Kilflynn IRA Flying Column, 1922.Back (L to R): Denis O'Connell (Lixnaw), Stephen Fuller (Kilflynn), William Hartnett (Mountcoal), Tim Tuomey (Kilflynn). Front (L to R): Terry Brosnan (Lixnaw), John McElligott (Leam, Kilflynn), Danny O'Shea (Kilflynn), Timothy (Aero) Lyons (Garrynagore), Tim Sheehy (Lyre), Pete Sullivan (Ballyduff), Paddy Mahony (Ballyegan, Battalion O.C.).

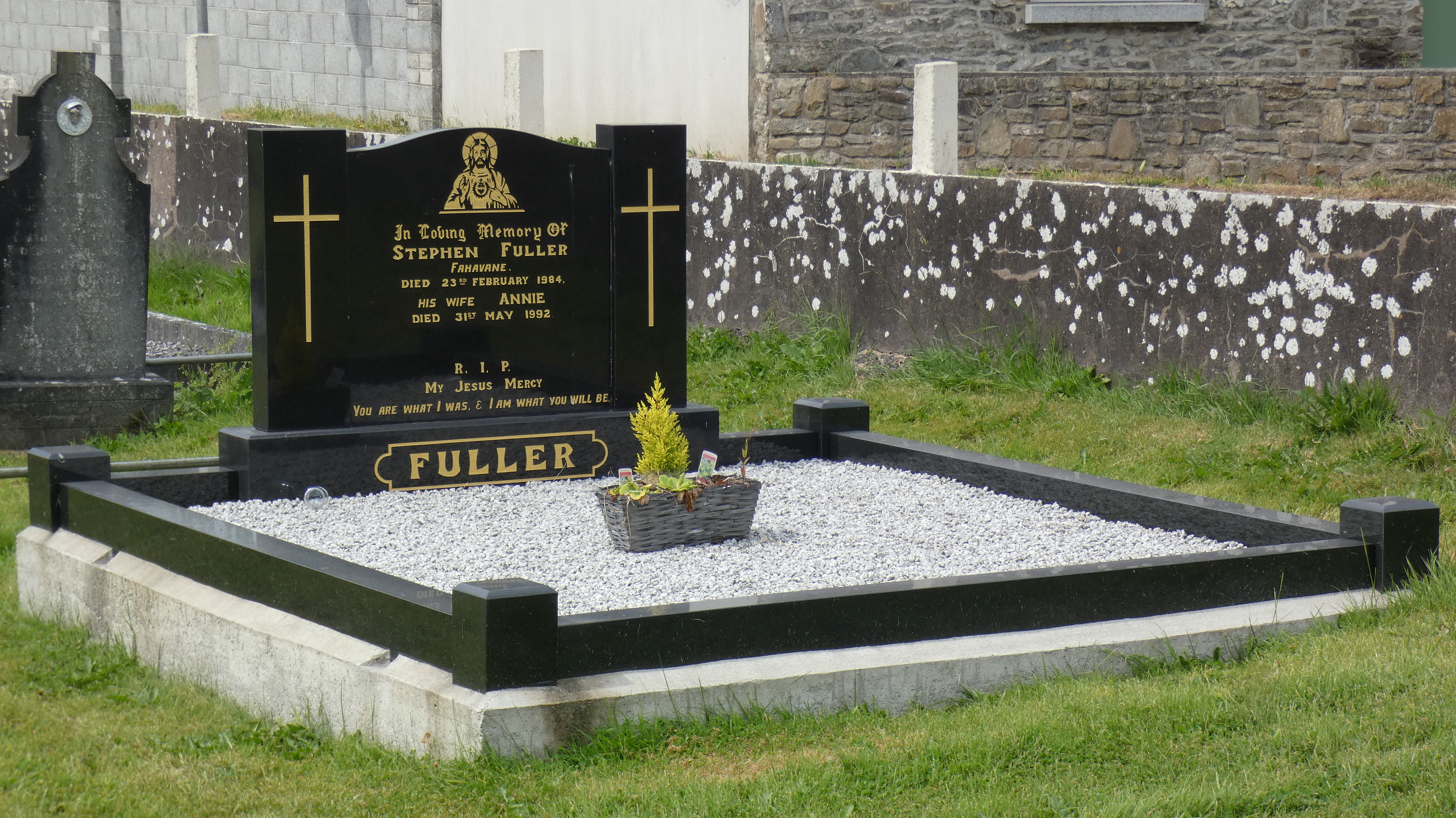
Stephen Fuller's grave in Kilflynn, by St. Columba's Heritage centre

In 1923, he was captured by Free State troops and imprisoned in Ballymullen Barracks in Tralee by the Dublin Guard who had landed in County Kerry shortly before. On 6 March 1923, five Free State soldiers were blown up by a booby-trapped bomb at Baranarigh Wood, Knocknagoshel, north Kerry, including long-standing colleagues of Major General Paddy O'Daly, G.O.C. Kerry Command. O'Daly then ordered that republican prisoners be used to remove mines. Prisoners had received beatings after the killings.

=== Ballyseedy massacre ===
On 7 March, nine prisoners from Ballymullen Barracks, six from the jail and three from the workhouse, were chosen with a broad geographical provenance and no well-known connections e.g. to the Church. They were taken lying down in a lorry to Ballyseedy Cross and secured by the hands and legs and to each other in a circle around a landmine. Fuller was amongst them. His Kilflynn parish comrade Tim Tuomey was initially stopped from praying until all prisoners were tied up. As he and other prisoners then said their prayers and goodbyes, Fuller continued to watch the retreating Dublin Guard soldiers, an act which he later said saved him. The mine was detonated and Fuller landed in a ditch, suffering burns and scars. He crossed the river Lee and hid in Ballyseedy woods; he was missed amongst the carnage as disabled survivors were bombed and shot dead with automatic fire. Most collected body parts were distributed between nine coffins that had been prepared. The explosions and gunfire were witnessed by Rita O'Donnell who lived nearby and who saw human remains spread about the next day. Similar reprisal killings by the Dublin Guard followed soon after Ballyseedy.

Fuller crawled away to the friendly home of the Currans nearby. They took him to the home of Charlie Daly the following day. His injuries were treated by a local doctor, Edmond Shanahan, who found him in a dug-out. He moved often in the coming months, including to the Burke and Boyle families, and stayed in a dug-out that had been prepared at the Herlihys for seven months.

A cover-up began almost immediately. Paddy O'Daly's communication to Dublin about returning the bodies to relatives differed significantly from Cumann na mBan statements - which O'Daly complained about as simple propaganda - and later that of Bill Bailey, a local who'd joined the Dublin Guard, who told Ernie O'Malley that the bodies were handed over in condemned coffins as a band played jolly music. Fuller was named amongst the dead in newspaper reports before it was realised that he'd escaped. O'Daly then sent a communication to GHQ that Fuller was reported as having become "insane". The Dublin Guard scoured the countryside for Fuller. The official investigation into the killings, was presided over by O'Daly himself, with Major General Eamon Price of GHQ and Colonel J. McGuinness of Kerry Command. It blamed Irregulars for planting the explosives and exonerated the Irish Army soldiers, and this was read out in the Dáil by the Minister of Defence, Richard Mulcahy.

Contrary statements to the Irish Army's submissions were effectively ignored. Lieutenant Niall Harrington of the Dublin Guard, described the evidence to the court and the findings as "totally untrue", explaining that the actions were devised and executed by officers of the Dublin Guard. He had contacted Kevin O'Higgins, Minister of Justice and Vice-President, a family friend, to deplore the findings. O'Higgins spoke to Richard Mulcahy, who did nothing. In a separate incident, Free State Lieutenant W.McCarthy, who'd been in charge of about 20 prisoners, said that 5 of them had been removed in the night. They were reportedly shot in the legs then blown up by, in his words, "...a Free State mine, laid by themselves". He resigned in protest. A Garda Síochána report into the events was also dismissed and wasn't made public for over 80 years.

== Civilian career and later life ==
Fuller left the IRA after the Civil War. He followed a career as a farmer in Kerry. He joined Fianna Fáil, the political party founded by Republican leader Éamon de Valera in 1926 after a split from Sinn Féin. He was elected to the 9th Dáil on his first attempt, representing Fianna Fáil at the 1937 general election, as the last of three Fianna Fáil TDs to be elected to the four seat Kerry North constituency. He was re-elected to the 10th Dáil at the 1938 general election, when Fianna Fáil again won three out of four seats, but lost his seat at the 1943 general election to the independent candidate Patrick Finucane. He returned to farming thereafter.

Fuller never once mentioned the Ballyseedy incident from a political platform and stated later that he bore no ill-will towards his captors or those who were involved in his attempted extrajudicial killing. He did not want the ill feeling passed on to the next generation. He spoke publicly about the events in 1980, a few years before his death, on Robert Kee's groundbreaking BBC series Ireland: A Television History. He was buried near the Republican plot in Kilflynn where colleagues O'Shea, Tuomey and Timothy 'Aero' Lyons were buried.

== Legacy ==
The Stephen Fuller Memorial Cup is a hare coursing event held in Kilflynn, named in his honour.

Dáil	Election	Deputy (Party)	Deputy (Party)	Deputy (Party)	Deputy (Party)
9th	1937	Stephen Fuller (FF)	Tom McEllistrim, Snr (FF)	John O'Sullivan (FG)	Eamon Kissane (FF)
10th	1938	Stephen Fuller (FF)	Tom McEllistrim, Snr (FF)	John O'Sullivan (FG)	Eamon Kissane (FF)
11th	1943	Dan Spring (Lab)	Tom McEllistrim, Snr (FF)	Patrick Finucane (CnaT)	Eamon Kissane (FF)
12th	1944	Dan Spring (NLP)	Tom McEllistrim, Snr (FF)	Patrick Finucane (CnaT)	Eamon Kissane (FF)
13th	1948	Dan Spring (NLP)	Tom McEllistrim, Snr (FF)	Patrick Finucane (CnaT)	Eamon Kissane (FF)
14th	1951	Dan Spring (Lab)	Tom McEllistrim, Snr (FF)	Patrick Finucane (Ind.)	John Lynch (FG)
15th	1954	Dan Spring (Lab)	Tom McEllistrim, Snr (FF)	Patrick Finucane (CnaT)	Johnny Connor (CnaP)
15th	1956 by-election	Dan Spring (Lab)	Tom McEllistrim, Snr (FF)	Patrick Finucane (CnaT)	Kathleen O'Connor (CnaP)
16th	1957	Dan Spring (Lab)	Tom McEllistrim, Snr (FF)	Patrick Finucane (Ind.)	Daniel Moloney (FF)
17th	1961	Dan Spring (Lab)	Tom McEllistrim, Snr (FF)	Patrick Finucane (Ind.)	3 seats from 1961
18th	1965	Dan Spring (Lab)	Tom McEllistrim, Snr (FF)	Patrick Finucane (Ind.)	3 seats from 1961
19th	1969	Dan Spring (Lab)	Gerard Lynch (FG)	Tom McEllistrim, Jnr (FF)	3 seats from 1961
20th	1973	Dan Spring (Lab)	Gerard Lynch (FG)	Tom McEllistrim, Jnr (FF)	3 seats from 1961
21st	1977	Dan Spring (Lab)	Kit Ahern (FF)	Tom McEllistrim, Jnr (FF)	3 seats from 1961
22nd	1981	Dick Spring (Lab)	Denis Foley (FF)	Tom McEllistrim, Jnr (FF)	3 seats from 1961
23rd	1982 (Feb)	Dick Spring (Lab)	Denis Foley (FF)	Tom McEllistrim, Jnr (FF)	3 seats from 1961
24th	1982 (Nov)	Dick Spring (Lab)	Denis Foley (FF)	Tom McEllistrim, Jnr (FF)	3 seats from 1961
25th	1987	Dick Spring (Lab)	Denis Foley (FF)	Jimmy Deenihan (FG)	3 seats from 1961
26th	1989	Dick Spring (Lab)	Tom McEllistrim, Jnr (FF)	Jimmy Deenihan (FG)	3 seats from 1961
27th	1992	Dick Spring (Lab)	Denis Foley (FF)	Jimmy Deenihan (FG)	3 seats from 1961
28th	1997	Dick Spring (Lab)	Denis Foley (FF)	Jimmy Deenihan (FG)	3 seats from 1961
29th	2002	Martin Ferris (SF)	Tom McEllistrim (FF)	Jimmy Deenihan (FG)	3 seats from 1961
30th	2007	Martin Ferris (SF)	Tom McEllistrim (FF)	Jimmy Deenihan (FG)	3 seats from 1961
31st	2011	Constituency abolished. See Kerry North–West Limerick			
