= James McEnery =

Irish republican soldier

James McEnery (28 April 1892 – 25 April 1923) was a farmer and IRA soldier who fought on the anti-Treaty side in the Irish Civil War in north Kerry. He surrendered during a three-day siege by Free State forces, in the last significant action of the War, and was executed seven days later.

== Early life and family ==
He was born to Margaret (née Stack) and Henry McEnery at 4 Slieveawaddra, Drommartin, County Kerry. His mother and father were national teachers and his father was also a farmer. Some of his older siblings became teachers and his brother was a Catholic priest.

He married Johannah (Hannah) Donnelly at Causeway on 13 April 1918. Their only child, Henry, known as 'Sunny', was born on 11 June 1920.

== Irish Civil War ==
He joined the Irish Volunteers and was a lieutenant in the 3rd Battalion, North Kerry. As in the Volunteers, in the IRA he was a lieutenant, 3rd Battalion, in the Kerry No.1 Brigade (also of North Kerry). He was part of 'Aeroplane' Lyons's column, which had been involved in the burning of a Civic Guard station at Ballyheigue and robbing Ballyduff post office. He had been captured and imprisoned by the National Army and claimed under interrogation that he was forced to join Lyons's column under fear of death, accused of being a traitor. Despite (with others) giving an undertaking he would not resume militant activity, he rejoined Lyons's column after his release. On 16 April, he took part in the column's ambush on a Free State raiding party at Meenoghane. The National Army's 1st Western Division supplied reinforcements quickly and pursued the column to Clashmealcon, where the members hid in Dumfort's Cave on the Atlantic cliffs with no possible escape. Two National Army troops were shot and killed by Lyons when trying to enter the cave. Two of the columns fell and drowned after trying to scale the cliff at night. McEnery surrendered with "Rudge" Hathaway and Edmond Greaney. They were taken to Ballymullen Barracks in Tralee. Lyons fell from a rope and was shot while lying on the rocks below.

== Trial and execution ==
On 18 April, McEnery and his two remaining colleagues were charged with the Ballyheigue burning, the Ballyduff robbery, stripping civic guards at Ballyheigue, attacking National troops at Clashmealcon and armed opposition to the government. They were tried and sentenced to death by Paddy Daly, OC of the National Army in Kerry. The following day, Daly asked for confirmation of the sentences, which duly arrived. McEnery was shot at 08:00 on 25 April, aged 30. He was initially interred at the gaol; a death entry was made in the register the following month, giving his age as 28. His body was finally released (and those of others executed) to relatives on 28 October the following year, when hundreds gathered outside the gaol.

== Legacy ==
McEnery was buried alongside executed colleagues in the Republican plot at Rahela Cemetery, Ballyduff. Hannah McEnery was granted £250 from the Irish White Cross and their son Henry £1 per week until working age. In 1932, pending new legislation, she applied for an allowance because of her dependency on McEnery and was awarded £67 and 10 shillings per annum (increased to £250 in the 1950s), and £18 per annum for their son. McEnery is counted as one of "the seventy-seven", a term made popular amongst Republicans after the writing of Dorothy Macardle in memory of those executed by Free State troops.
