= Reginald Walter Stenning =

British Army deserter in the IRA

Reginald Walter Stenning (aliases Reginald Stephen Hathaway, Walter Stephens and Richard Stenning) (26 February 1903 – 25 April 1923) was a British Army deserter who joined the Irish Republican Army (IRA), fighting on the anti-Treaty side in the Civil War. After being captured by Free State forces he was beaten and executed.

== Biography ==
He was born at 96 Oldfield Road, Willesden, to Edith Annie (née Holton) and Walter Stevens Stenning, a librarian's assistant. In his early years he also lived at 52 Sherrard Road, Forest Gate.

== Career ==
It is unclear why he joined the IRA and exactly when - as he had no known connexion with Ireland - or which British Army regiment he was originally with, although contemporary newspaper reports state he'd been with the East Lancashire Regiment. Michael P. Sullivan, who signed off for and collected his body after his execution, told the authorities that Stenning deserted his unit in Tralee in 1922 [the RIC was disbanded in early 1922], stayed at Sullivan's house and "worked around for a while" using the surname "Hathaway" to avoid recognition, joining the IRA during the Civil War. IRA captain James Houlihan reported to the Bureau of Military History in 1955 that Stenning arrived as a deserter in Ballyheigue and that British soldiers arrived the next day looking for him. He said this was around the time that Ballyheigue castle was burned in May 1921. Stenning's IRA colleagues called him "Rudge". He was involved with the robbery of Ballyduff post office. When captured, he gave the name Walter Stephens. He spent four-and-a-half months in Tralee gaol. Like other IRA prisoners, he gave an undertaking not to take up arms against the Free State. He claimed - along with two others - that he was ordered to fight with 'Aeroplane' Lyons's column under penalty of death with the accusation that he was a traitor to their cause. A week after his release (according to Sullivan) he rejoined Lyons's column in North Kerry. After taking part in an ambush on a Free-State raiding party at Meenoghane, the column was trapped at the Clashmealcon caves by the National Army's 1st Western Division. Stenning - who'd been recognised by Free-State officers - and two others, James McEnery and Edmond Greaney, were captured, beaten and taken to Ballymullen Barracks where the three were charged with the post office robbery, burning a Civic Guard station at Ballyheigue and stripping the guards, attacking National Army troops at Clashmealcon and taking up arms against the Government. Stenning gained particular attention because a weekly report written on 17 April stated he had a note of safe passage on him signed by the OC of Kerry at the time, Paddy Daly, and that he had been a deserter not just from the British but from the National Army before joining the anti-Treaty IRA. The siege at the cliffs ended on 18 April: two of Lyons's column had already drowned after falling from the cliff at night; Lyons fell onto rocks and was riddled with bullets from the cliff-top.

== Execution ==
Stenning - documented as 23-year-old Reginald Stephen Hathaway in Irish records - was tried, found guilty and sentenced to death by Paddy Daly, who promptly asked for the sentence to be confirmed by Dublin. Stenning was executed at Ballymullen Barracks, Tralee, on 25 April 1923, along with McEnery and Greaney; the entry of death, dated 5 May 1923, gives the cause as "shock and haemorrhage following gunshot wounds". Some military correspondence after his death (also for his colleagues) refers to the execution date as 23 April. The charge recorded on military pension documentation was "the offence of taking part in an attack on National Forces on the 18th April, 1923, at Clash, Ballyduff, on which attack two members of the National Army were killed." He was buried in the republican plot at Rahela Graveyard, Ballyduff, after his body and those of his executed colleagues were released in 1924. Documents released by the Military Service Pensions Collection in 2013 show that in 1933, his parents applied to the Irish Ministry of Pensions for a gratuity because of his IRA service. They involved intermediaries, including Sullivan, Mary A. O'Donnell and Eamon Kissane, a Teachta Dála for Kerry. Stenning's father wrote that his son had gone to Ireland with "the Lancashire Regiment" and had then fought against the "infamous Black and Tans" before fighting with the IRA in the Civil War under Thomas Driscoll and Aero Lyons. His service in the IRA was acknowledged by the pensions board, at least between September 1922 and his execution date, but a gratuity was not granted as it was determined his parents were not dependent on him; his father hadn't seen him since 1920 and officials related that Irish people knew far more about his final years. The correspondence ended in 1938 with Defence Minister Frank Aiken confirming the final decision to Kissane by letter. Stenning is listed amongst "the seventy-seven" [with the name 'Hathaway'], a term made popular by Republican propagandist Dorothy Macardle to celebrate anti-treaty fighters executed by the National Army.
