= Timothy Lyons =

Irish republican soldier

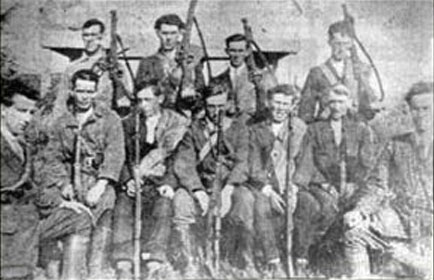
- Kilflynn's IRA flying column in 1922. Lyons is seated centrally in the front row.
- Born: 4 December 1895; Kilflynn, County Kerry, Ireland
- Died: 16 April 1923 (aged 25) Clashmealcon caves, County Kerry, Ireland
- Branch: Kerry No.1 Brigade, 2nd Battalion
- Rank: commandant

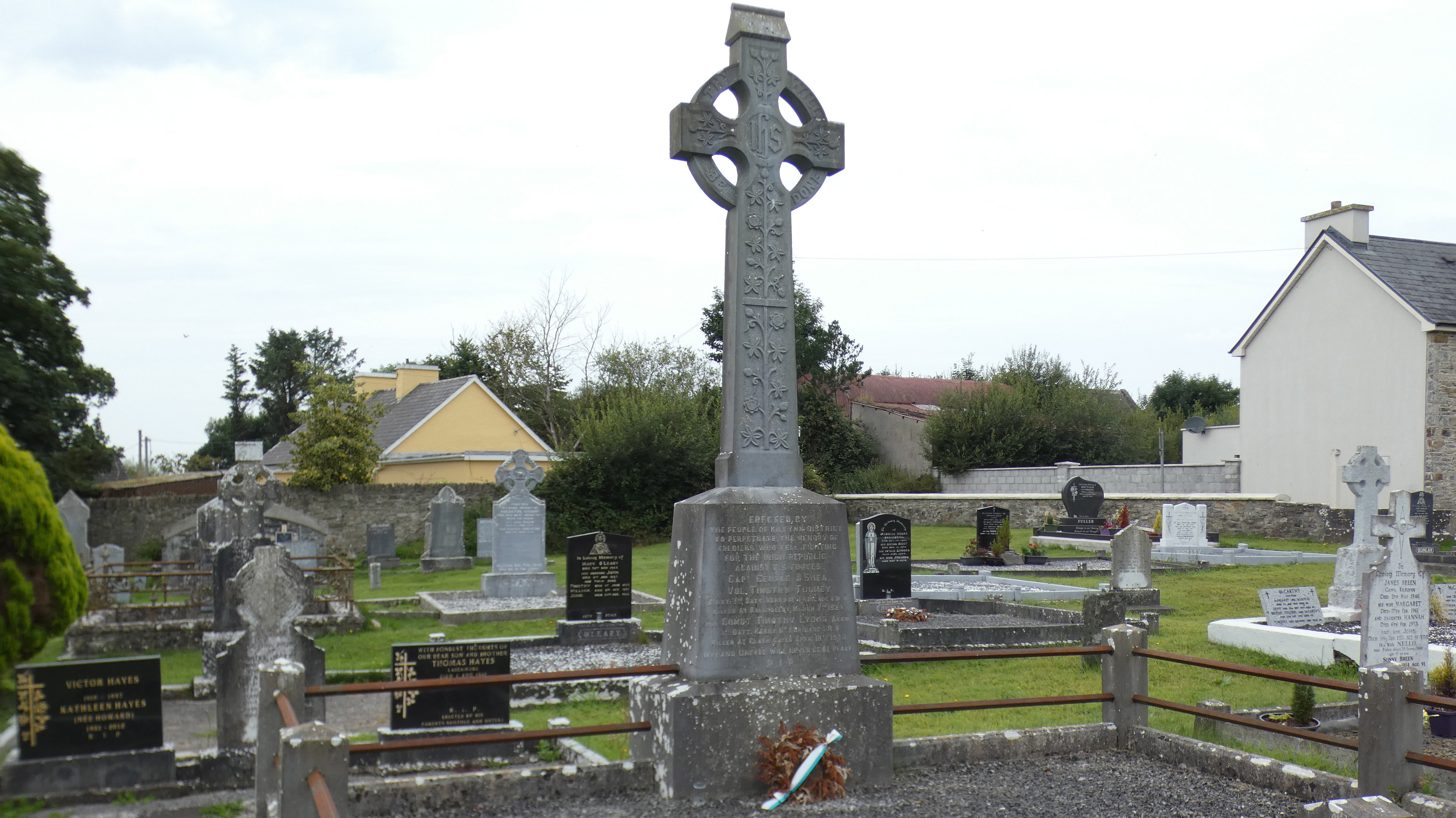
The Republican plot in Kilflynn village where Lyons was buried alongside Timothy Tuomey and George O'Shea.

Timothy Lyons (4 December 1895 -16 April 1923), a.k.a. Aero or Aeroplane, was an Irish Republican Army (IRA) soldier who fought with the Anti-Treaty side during the Irish Civil War. After a three-day siege by Free State forces at Clashmealcon, County Kerry, he died after falling from a cliff onto rocks and then being shot.

== Biography ==
Lyons was born in Garrynagore, County Kerry to Margaret (formerly Sullivan) and Timothy Lyons senior, who was listed on his birth certificate as a cottier. Lyons was the oldest of six siblings. Prior to the Civil War, he had worked as a labourer. He fought with the IRA's Kilflynn Company during the War of Independence. He was described as being slight, "adventurous" as a column leader and a marksman who shot at small birds. He shot a British officer in an ambush led by captain George O'Shea at Shannow Bridge where the Kilflynn road joins the R557, forcing a retreat. Lyons gained the nickname "Aeroplane" or "Aero" because of the way he would suddenly appear and his last-minute escapes. Because of regular searches by 'Black and Tans', his father feared the family home would be burnt out and asked him to leave.

After the ratification of the Anglo-Irish Treaty, he fought against Free State forces . At the time of his death he was commandant. He was involved in fighting in Listowel and Limerick, was captured near Athea, gaoled in Limerick and released in late 1922 with an undertaking not to rejoin the fight. Notwithstanding this, the column continued to operate, generally around Causeway and Ballyduff. On 15 April 1923, Lyons' column attacked a Free State raiding party in Meenoghane, north Kerry. The raiding party received reinforcements; he and his men were eventually surrounded at nearby Clashmealcon on 16 April by Michael Hogan's 1st Western Division. They descended the rugged, Atlantic cliffs to the caves and hid in Dumfort's Cave. Lyons shot out searchlights with his Lee Enfield rifle and two Free State soldiers were shot dead from the cave. The situation was under Army Emergency Powers. With no escape for the men hiding, troops tried to blast them out by dropping mines and smoke them out with petrol-soaked turf etc. On 16 April, James McGrath, the brother of Tom McGrath, one of Lyons's men, was arrested and taken to the cliffs in order to enter the cave and persuade the men to surrender. On the night of 17–18 April, Tom McGrath and Patrick O'Shea, his first cousin, fell trying to scale the cliffs to escape and drowned. After offering to surrender himself on the morning of the 18 April, Lyons fell several metres onto rocks from a rope that was provided by National troops. He was then shot multiple times by troops from the cliff top and was not recovered. Three of Lyons' men who'd surrendered, Edmond Greaney, James McEnery and British deserter-turned-republican Reginald Stephen Hathaway, were executed in Ballymullen Barracks by gunshot on 25 April, for breaking their undertaking not to take up arms against the Free State, attacking troops at Clashmealcon, burning the Civic Guard station at Ballyheigue, stripping the same Civic Guards and robbing the post office at Ballyduff. Lyons' decomposing body, minus a leg, was washed up on 5 May, identifiable by a boot.

He was buried alongside George O'Shea and Timothy Tuomey (both killed at Ballyseedy) in the Republican plot at Kilflynn Church (now St. Columba's Heritage Centre).
