= John Forrest Kelly =

American electrical engineer

John Forrest Kelly (March 28, 1859, in the vicinity of Carrick-on-Suir, Ireland – 1922) was an American electrical engineer who made early advances in alternating current equipment.

== Early life ==
Kelly was the son of two Fenian schoolteachers, Jeremiah and Kate Forrest Kelly, who had eleven other children; he emigrated to America in 1873. He was educated in Stevens Institute of Technology, Hoboken, New Jersey, received the degree of B. L. in 1878 and that of Ph.D. in 1881. His sister was the activist and surgeon Dr. Gertrude Kelly.

== Career ==
His first occupation was as assistant to Thomas A. Edison, in the Menlo Park laboratory, his work then principally relating to the chemistry of rare earths. Late in 1879 Mr. Kelly became electrical engineer of the New York branch of the Western Electric Company. This was the time when the telephone was being generally introduced, and when dynamos were being first applied to telegraphic purposes. In 1882 he became laboratory assistant to Edward Weston, then chief electrician of the United States Electric Lighting Company, and, with the exception of a year which he spent in connection with the Remingtons, Mr. Kelly continued his association with Mr. Weston (Westinghouse Electric Company) until July, 1886. Some of the most important work, such as the research which ended in the discovery of high resistance alloys of very low or even negative temperature co-efficients, were substantially carried out by Mr. Kelly under general directions from Mr. Weston, whom Mr. Kelly succeeded as chief electrician of the United States Electric Lighting Company, which, in 1889, passed to the Westinghouse interests; but Mr. Kelly retained his position as chief electrician until January, 1892, when he resigned to join William Stanley in experimental work. With William Stanley and Cummings C. Chesney, he was a partner in the Stanley Electric Manufacturing Company, which became the General Electric transformer plant in Pittsfield, Massachusetts.

The work done by Mr. Kelly, in this connection, gave a great impetus to the alternating current business. The art of building transformers and generators of alternating currents was revolutionized, and Mr. Kelly and his colleagues were the first to put polyphase motors into actual commercial service. That success naturally led to long-distance transmission work, and the first long-distance transmission plants in California (indeed the first in the world), were undertaken on Mr. Kelly's recommendation and advice. He was the first to make a hysteretically stable steel, a matter of vastly more importance than the comparatively spectacular transmission work. He served as a consulting engineer to the Stanley Electric Manufacturing Company in Pittsfield and the Stanley Instrument Company in Great Barrington until 1905, then helped found the Telelectric Piano Company in 1905, serving as president until 1910. He experimented in electrical transmission, distribution and measuring procedures and equipment: with Chesney and Stanley, he developed the SKC transformer.

After accumulating over seventy patents, and commercializing an electric player piano and a food dehydration system, he spent his later life supporting the cause of Irish nationalism, primarily by writing anonymous articles and editorials for the Irish World. Mr. Kelly was a thorough and unswerving Irish Nationalist, and his splendid generosity to the cause was well known. In the 1880s he was an individualist anarchist writer, in Liberty, Alarm and Lucifer. From 1916-18, he was the president of the Mass. State Council, Friends of Irish Freedom. From 1920-21, he wrote a third of the Irish World’s anonymous political commentary. From July to December, 1921, he promoted a nationwide boycott of British goods. He married Miss Helen Fischer, in New York City, in 1892, and they had two children - Eoghan and Domnall. He died October 15, 1922, in Pittsfield, Massachusetts.
