= Edmond Greaney =

Irish republican soldier

Edmond Greaney [also 'Edward', 'Eamonn/Eamon' and 'Greany' on historical documents] (c.1893 – 25 April 1923) was a farm labourer and IRA soldier who fought on the anti-Treaty side in the Irish Civil War in north Kerry. He was captured by Free State forces and executed after the last major action of the War.

Greaney grew up with the Quinlan family at Ballinbrahig, Ballyduff, County Kerry. Details provided after his death by Elizabeth Quinlan give the address as Beenduff, Ballyduff; in her application for an allowance, Greaney was described as a Quinlan's 'cousin' - actually the son of her husband Michael's first cousin [a woman who'd left for Australia] – and her 'adopted son'. He is on the 1901 census, aged 8, at 1 Ballinbrahig as a 'cousin' and the 1911 census at 5 Ballinbrahig, aged 19, as a 'farm servant', both at the Quinlan household. Greaney joined the Irish Volunteers and fought in the IRA's No.1 Kerry Brigade as part of 'Aeroplane' Lyons's column, which had been involved in a number of militant activities in north Kerry including the burning of a Civic Guard house in Ballyheigue. He had also previously been captured and imprisoned by the National Army but had promised not to take up arms against Free State troops again. On 16 April, after an ambush on a Free State raiding party, Greaney, Lyons and the four other members of the column present went to the cliffs at Clashmealcon and hid in Dumfort's Cave there after the National Army's 1st Western Division received reinforcements and followed them. With only one exit from the cave they were trapped. During the siege, two National Army troops were shot dead trying to enter the cave. Other troops used ad hoc concoctions to try to smoke column members out. Two of his colleagues fell into the sea and drowned after trying to scale the cliff to escape. Greaney surrendered along with James McEnery and "Rudge" Hathaway. They were beaten and taken to Ballymullen Barracks in Tralee. The siege ended on 18 April when Lyons fell onto rocks from a rope provided by the troops, was shot multiple times and left to the elements.

Paddy Daly, OC of the National Army in Kerry at the time, tried Greaney and his colleagues. He was charged with attacking National troops at Clashmealcon, robbing the Ballyduff post office, burning the Civic Guard Station at Ballyheigue, stripping the guards there and being in armed opposition of the government. He was summarily convicted and sentenced to death. On 19 April, Daly requested confirmation of the sentence of execution which arrived shortly after. Greaney was shot at 8 o'clock in the morning on 25 April. Some documentation records his execution as 23 April. A death certificate was issued the following month, recording his age as 25, however both the 1901 and 1911 census returns imply he was about 30 upon his death. His body, along with those of other Republicans, was disinterred from the gaol and released to relatives in 1924. He was reinterred in the Republican plot at Rahela Cemetery, Ballyduff, under the name 'Edward Greaney'. In the 1920s, Elizabeth Quinlan applied to the Irish White Cross and in the 1930s to the Irish state for allowances, claiming that she was dependent upon Greaney; both claims were rejected. Greaney is one of "the seventy-seven" made famous by Dorothy Macardle in, memory of those executed by Free State troops.
