= Lily O'Brennan =

Irish republican, writer and playwright

- Born: Elizabeth Mary Brennan; 20 August 1878; Dublin, Ireland
- Died: 31 May 1948 (aged 69); Dublin, Ireland
- Other name: Lily O'Brennan
- Organization: Cumann na mBan
- Relatives: Áine O'Brennan (sister); Kathleen O'Brennan (sister); Éamonn Ceannt(brother in law)

Elizabeth O'Brennan (20 August 1878 – 31 May 1948), was an Irish republican, writer and playwright.

== Background ==
O'Brennan was born in Summer Street, Dublin, the third daughter of Francis Brennan, auctioneer, and Elizabeth Anne Butler. They were a nationalist family and later added the 'O' prefix to their name. Her sister Áine O'Brennan married Éamonn Ceannt, and her other sister Kathleen O'Brennan became a playwright and journalist. Her father died in 1880, her mother in 1930.

O'Brennan became a teacher and contributed to both Irish and American periodicals. She wrote a play, May Eve in Stephen's Green, produced with Máire Nic Shiubhlaigh and performed in Father Mathew Hall, Church Street, Dublin in 1912; it was inspired by a statue of James Clarence Mangan in St Stephen's Green. The play got good reviews.

== Nationalism ==
O'Brennan attended the inaugural meeting of Cumann na mBan, held in Wynn's Hotel, Dublin, and was a member of its central branch. When Cumann na mBan split due to the start of World War I the O'Brennan's sided against the proposal to volunteer with the British. Both sisters were involved in planning for the Easter Rising. O'Brennan bought the makings of the flag for the 4th Battalion of the Irish Volunteers and made the first aid kits. She and her sister, Áine Ceannt, helped to assemble equipment and she carried dispatches for Éamonn Ceannt, her brother-in-law. Like many she only discovered the mobilisation was going ahead the night before it happened.

O'Brennan was stationed in the Marrowbone Lane distillery under the command of Con Colbert and remained there all week. She was arrested with the garrison there and held at Richmond Barracks and Kilmainham Gaol. The day she was released was the day her brother-in-law was executed, 8 May 1916. O'Brennan worked as a clerk for the National Aid Association later the Prisoner's Dependents Fund as well as locating and marking the graves of those killed during the Rising.

After the Rising, in late 1917, O'Brennan joined the executive of Cumann na mBan, she was also a member of the Sinn Féin executive. In 1918 she recruited new members throughout Longford and Wicklow. O'Brennan was one of the two delegation secretaries for the 1921 treaty delegation. Mary MacSwiney proposed O'Brennan to be appointed as a plenipotentiary to the negotiations but she was thought to be "too extreme". She lived in 22 Hans Place, Brompton, London and worked for Arthur Griffith as his secretary for a time in 1922. Despite being part of the Treaty group, O'Brennan was on the Anti-treaty side during the Civil War. She worked on the staff of the Republican headquarters, secretary to Erskine Childers. She was arrested there in November 1922 and imprisoned in Mountjoy Prison, then moved to Kilmainham on 6 February 1923 where she spent three months. During this time she participated in the 1923 Irish hunger strikes. It was there she organised the 7th anniversary commemoration of the Easter Rising. In May 1923 she was sent to the North Dublin Union, where she took part in a failed escape attempt. She was however released only a few weeks later.

O'Brennan wrote a novel, using the pseudonym ‘Esther Graham’, entitled The call to arms: a tale of the land league (1929). She was a founder member of the Catholic Writers Guild in 1947.

O'Brennan lived in Churchtown, Dundrum, County Dublin. She died on 31 May 1948 and was buried in the Deansgrange cemetery. Her papers are in the University College Dublin Archives.
