= Áine Ceannt =

Irish revolutionary activist and humanitarian leader

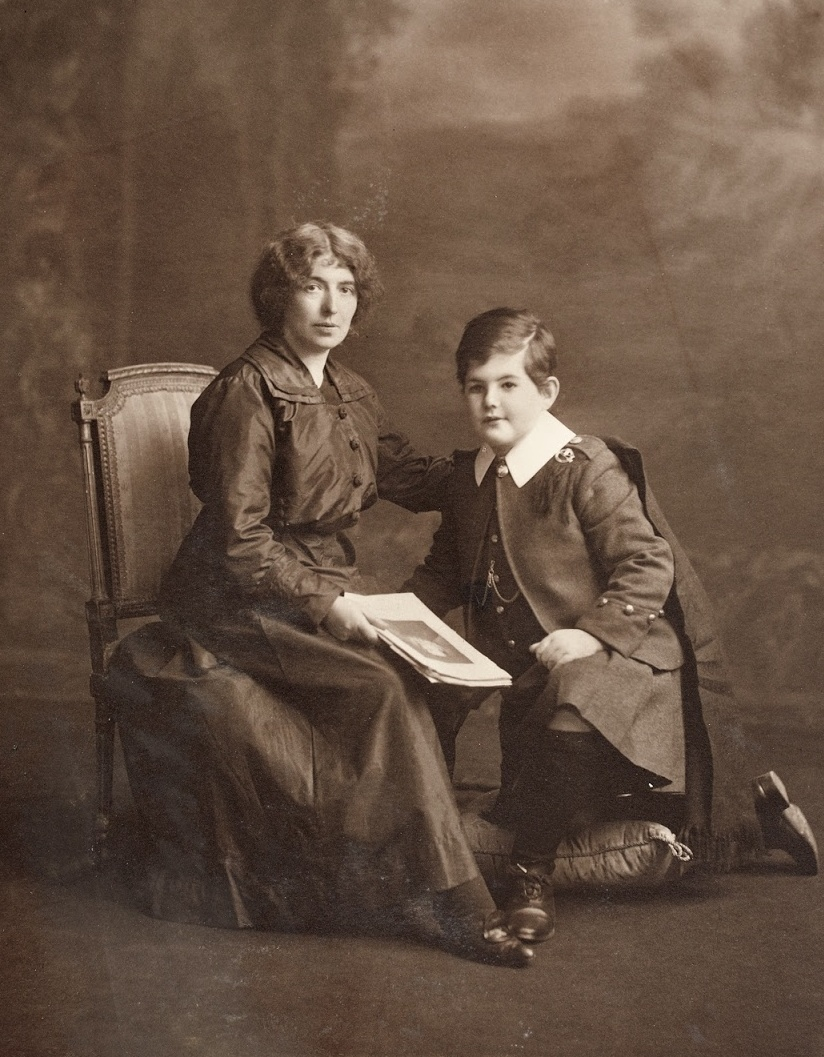
- Áine and her son Ronan, c. 1917
- Born: Frances Mary Brennan; 23 September 1880; Dublin, Ireland
- Died: 2 February 1954 (aged 73); Dublin, Ireland
- Resting place: Glasnevin Cemetery, Dublin, Ireland
- Spouse: Éamonn Ceannt (m. 1905; died 1916)
- Relatives: Lily O'Brennan (sister); Kathleen O'Brennan (sister)

Áine Ceannt (née Ní Bhraonáin; 23 September 1880 – 2 February 1954) was an Irish revolutionary activist and humanitarian leader.

== Biography ==
Born Frances Mary Brennan at 28 Upper Camden Street in Dublin on 23 September 1880, she was the daughter of Francis Brennan, who himself had been a Fenian earlier in his life, and sister of Lily O'Brennan and Kathleen O'Brennan. Her mother was Elizabeth Anne Butler. She was educated at the Dominican College, Eccles Street, and adopted the name Áine upon joining the Gaelic League. It was through her Irish language activism that she met her future husband Éamonn Ceannt, whom she married in June 1905. Their son, Ronan, was born in June 1906. A convinced republican, she joined Cumann na mBan on its foundation in 1914. She wrote and delivered dispatches during the Easter Rising. Her husband was one of the signatories of the Proclamation of the Republic and was executed by the British at Kilmainham Gaol on 8 May 1916.

Newly widowed, she continued her republican activism, serving as Vice-President of Cumann na mBan and as a member of the Sinn Féin Standing Committee. She also played a role in the development of the Dáil Courts (or Sinn Féin Courts), a parallel legal system designed to offer an alternative to the British courts. Áine Ceannt served as a Justice in the Pembroke and Rathmines Republican Courts.

Áine Ceannt was ardently opposed to the signing of the Anglo-Irish Treaty in December 1921. She was imprisoned by the Irish Free State government during the Civil War in Mountjoy for her anti-Treaty activity. Throughout the war, Ceannt served at the highest levels within anti-Treaty Sinn Féin. In the years that followed, she spearheaded efforts to secure state compensation for the widows and children of those who had died in 1916 and in the War of Independence. She served as the head of the Children’s Fund of the Irish White Cross, an American-funded humanitarian organisation founded to assist victims of unrest in Ireland. She was a member of the Executive Committee of the Irish Red Cross.
