= Clashmealcon =

Townland in County Kerry, Ireland

Clashmealcon Irish: Clais Maolchon
- Townland
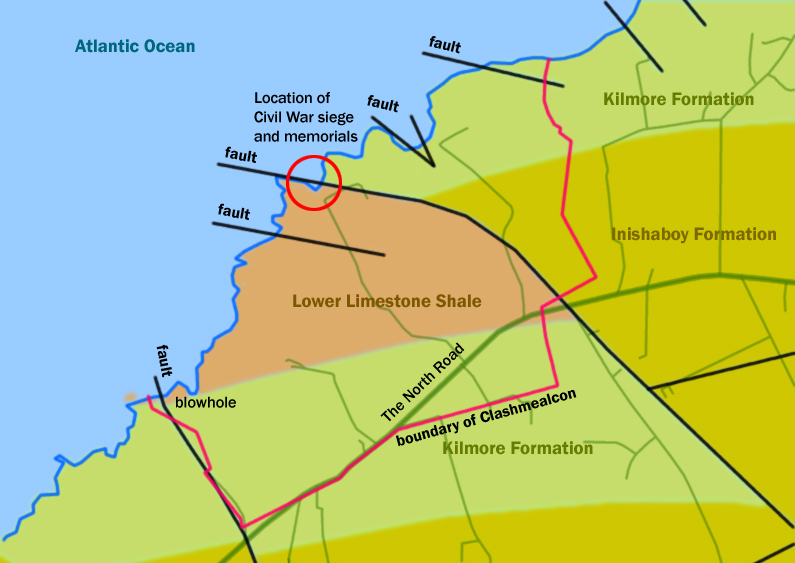
- Townland of Clashmealcon with geography and local details.

- Location in Ireland
- Coordinates: 52°27′45″N 9°44′12″W
- Country: Ireland
- Province: Munster
- County: County Kerry

Population (2022)
  - Total: 188
- Time zone: UTC+0 (WET)
  - Summer (DST): UTC-1 (IST (WEST))

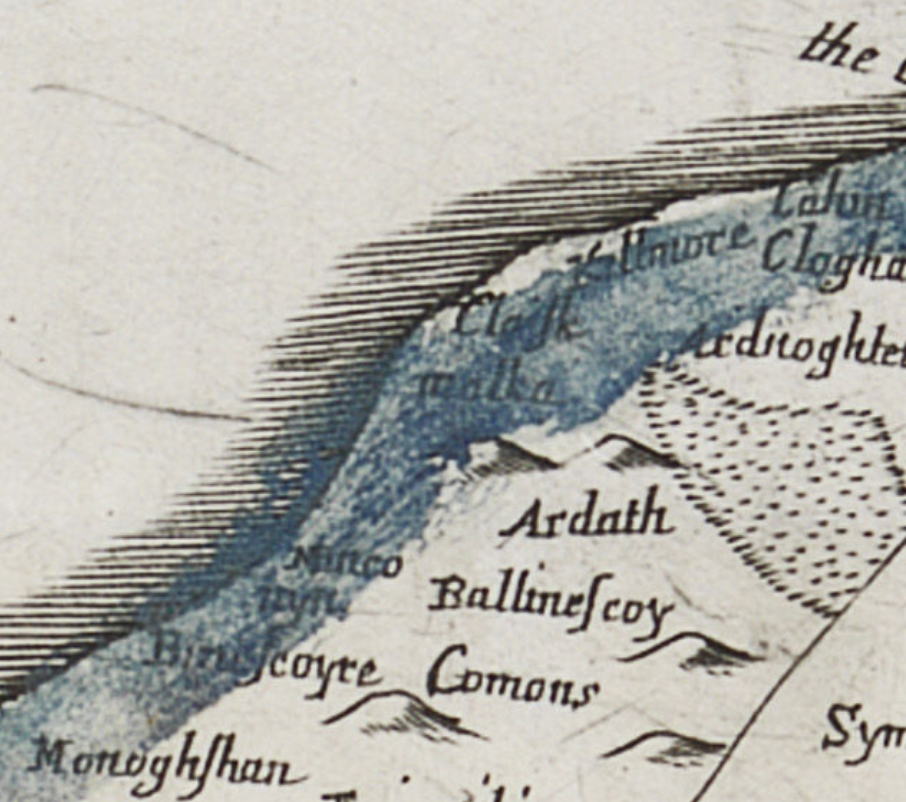
Detail of Down Survey map of Killury parish in Kerry with Clashmealcon (Claisk Malka) at centre.

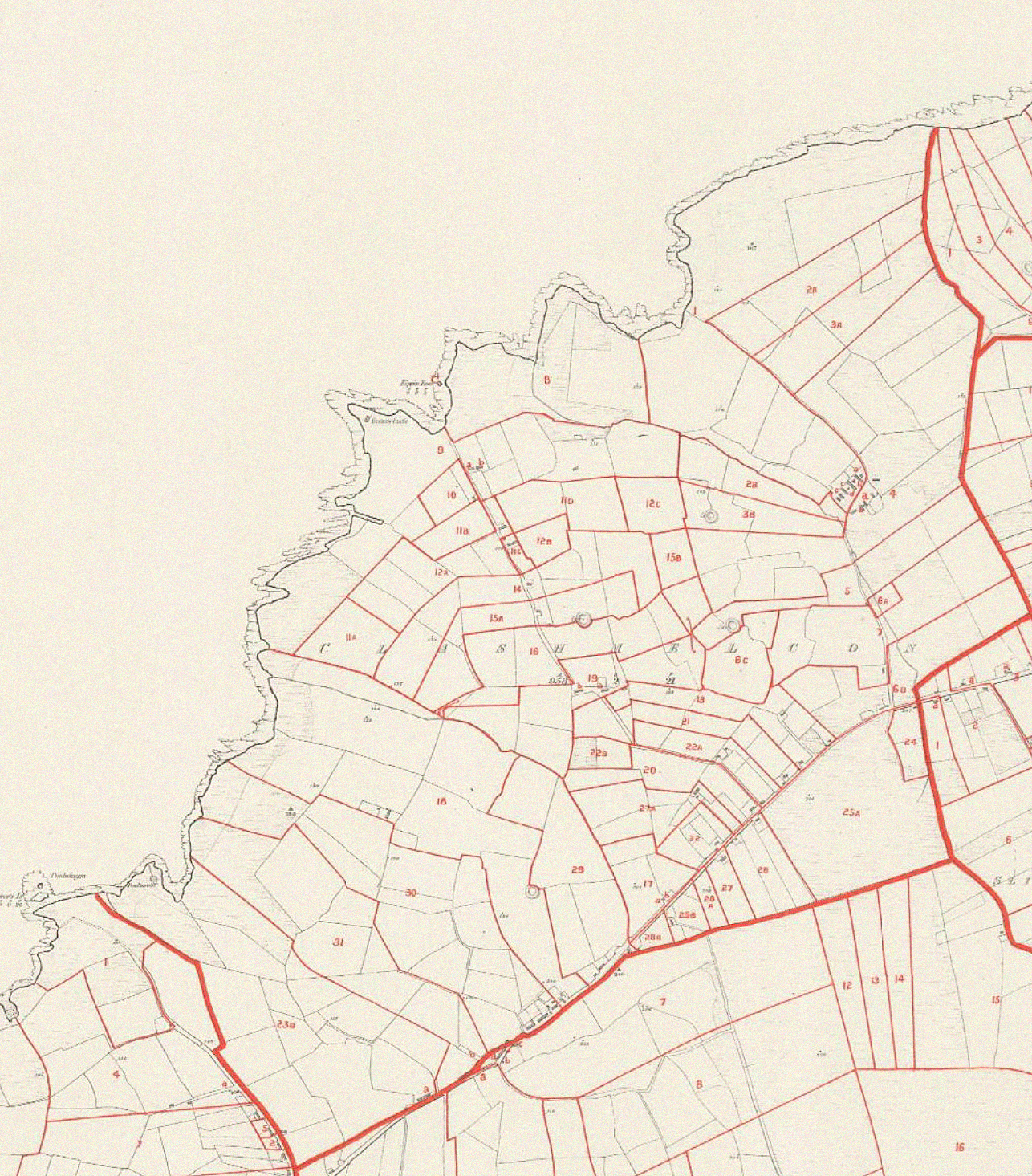
Detail of Clashmealcon from Griffith's Valuation map of Killury.

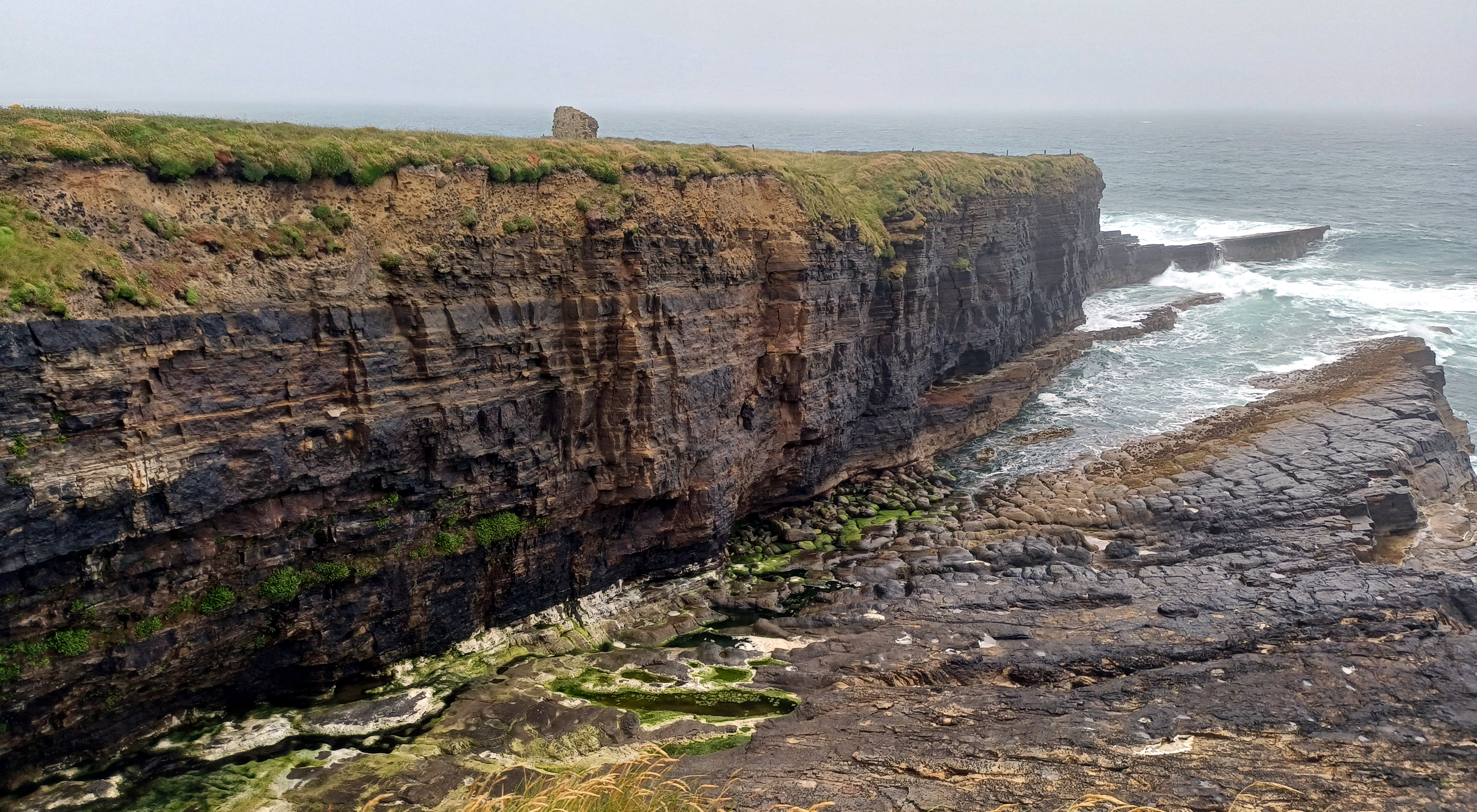
The fault line of the Clashmealcon limestone shale to the west running along the cliff with the Kilmore sandstone-mudstone formation to the east.

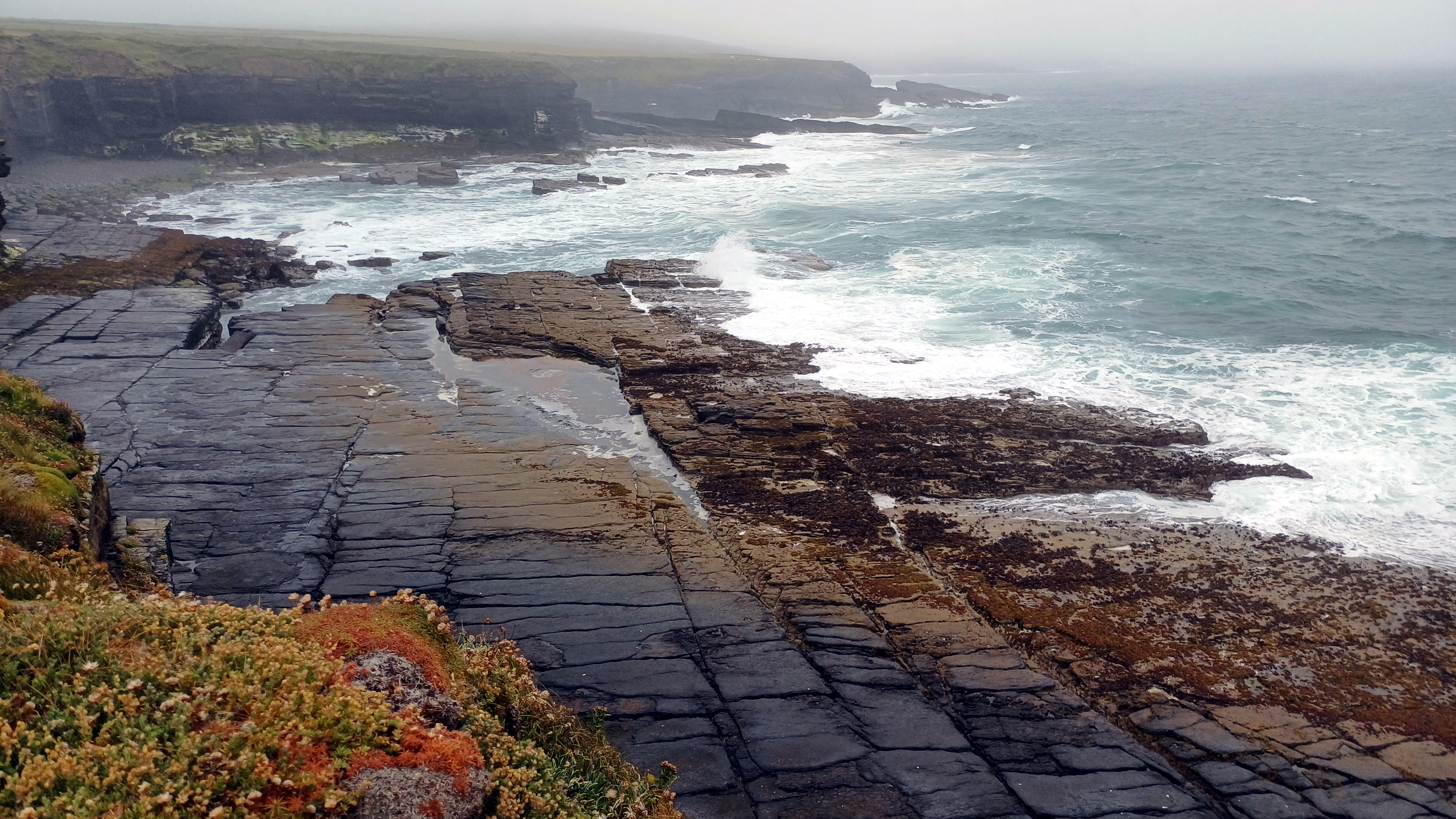
Cliffs and rock pavement looking SSW towards Poll Tarbh in the far distance

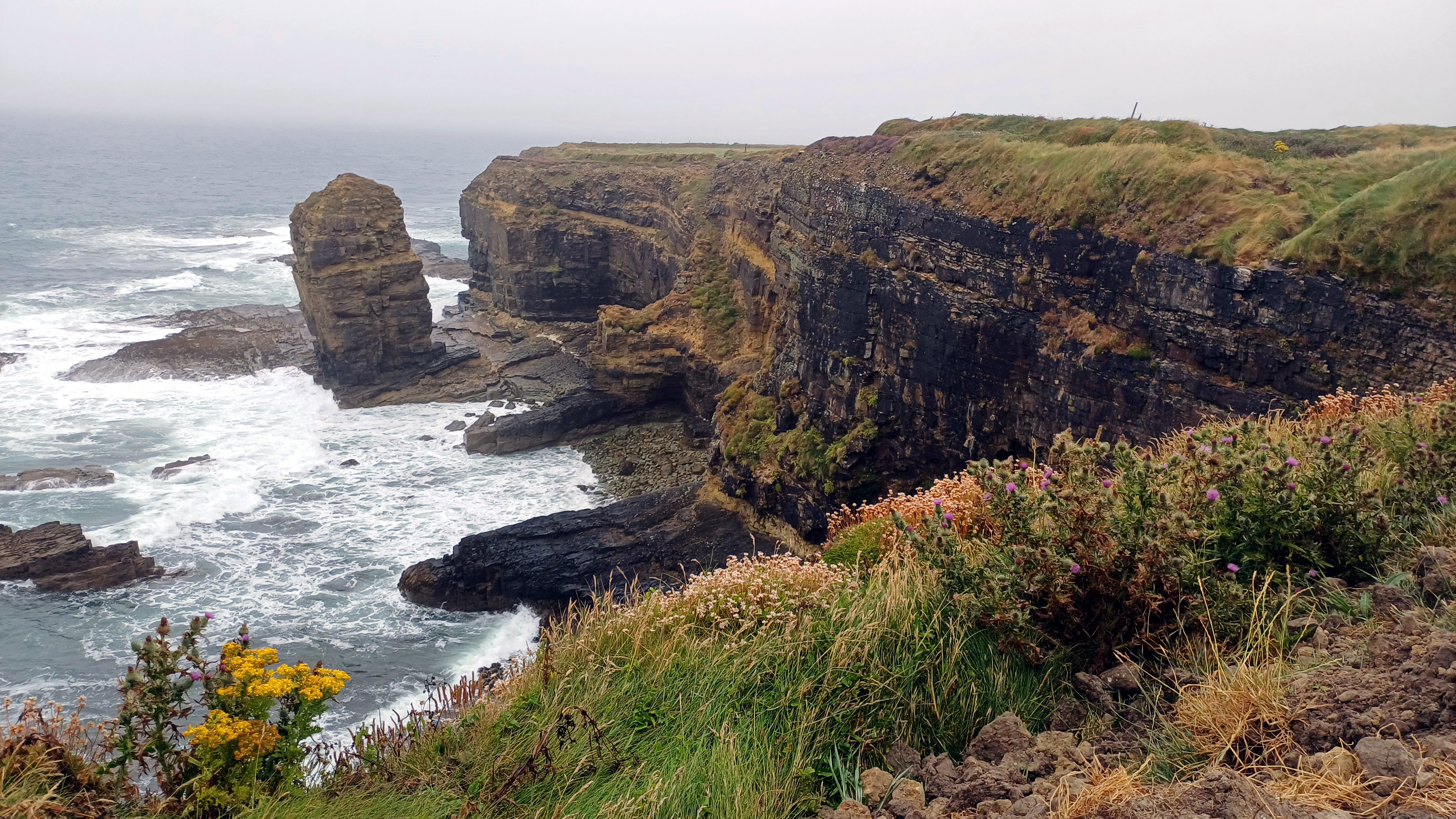
The start of the Kilmore Formation on the east of the townland including Kippin Rock.

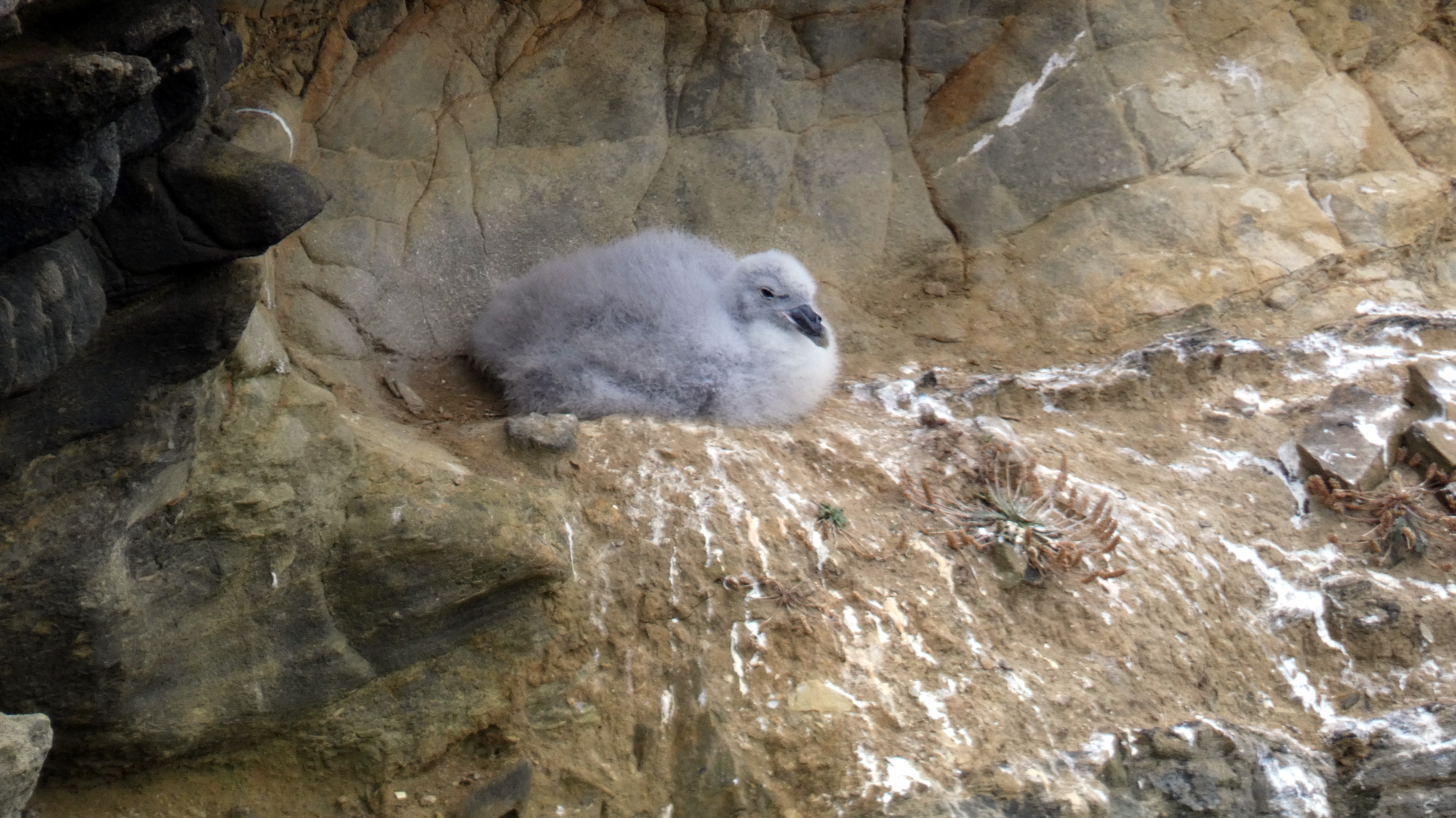
Fulmar chick on the nest on Kippin Rock.

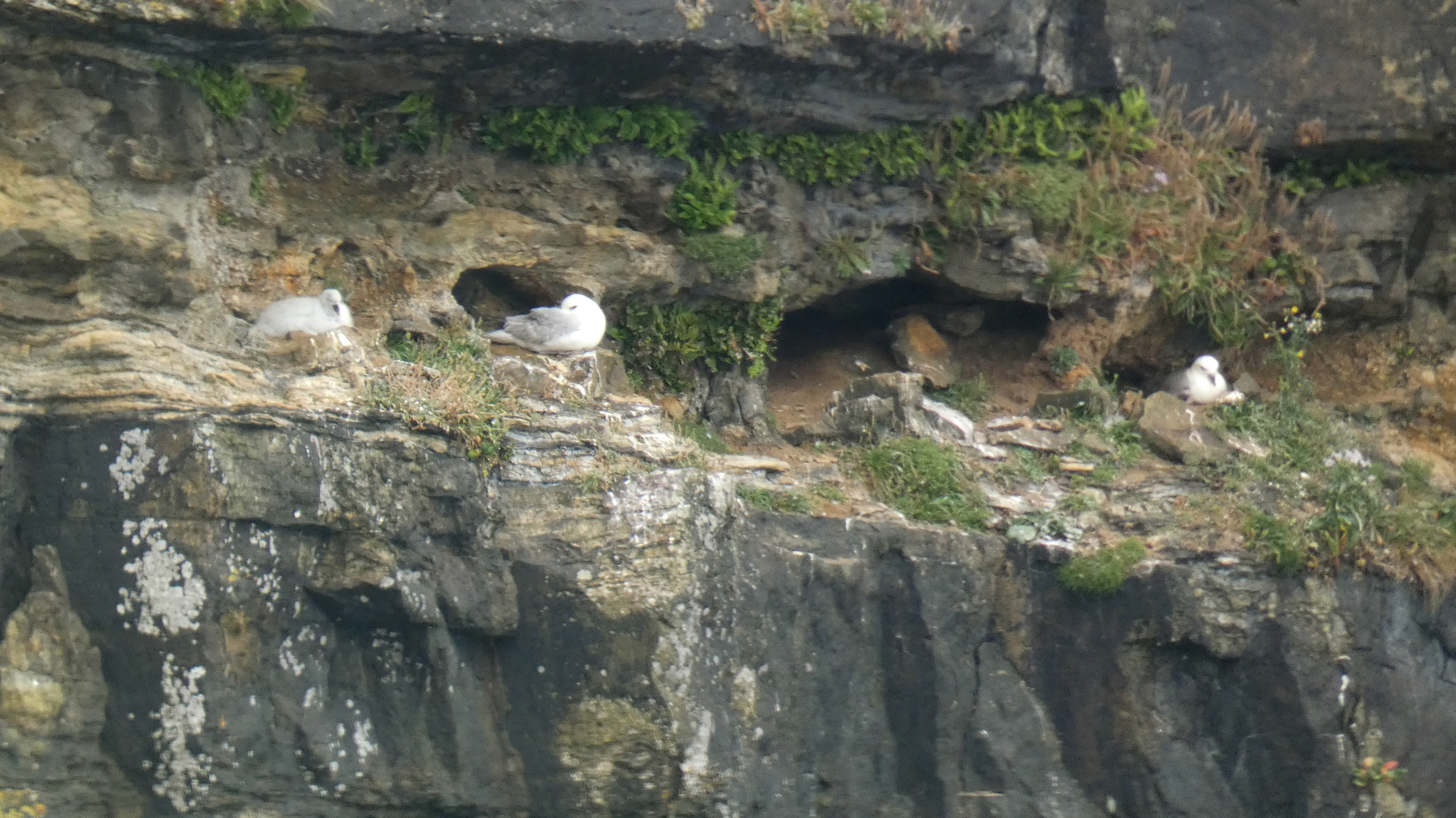
Fulmars nesting on the cliffs.

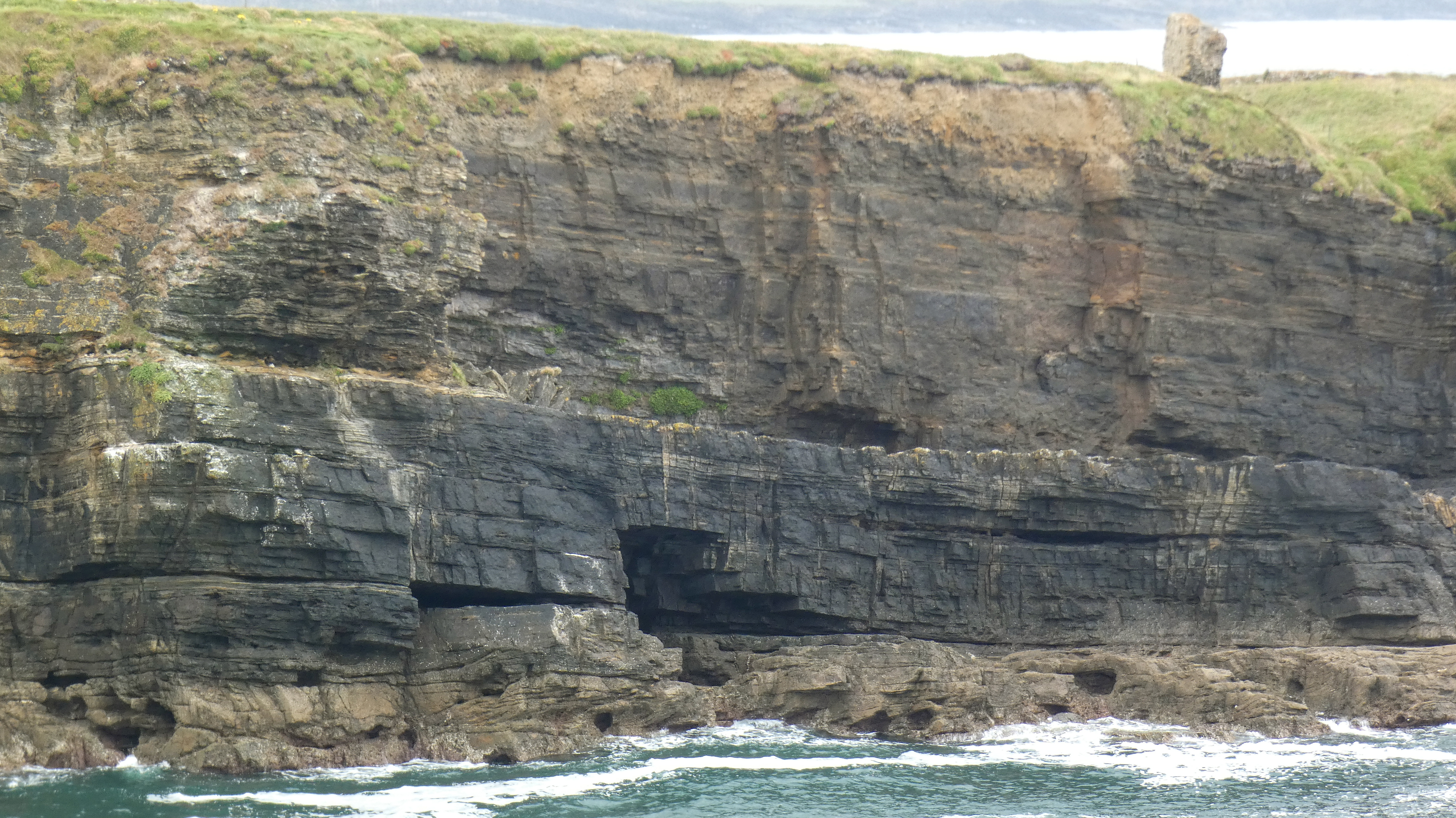
The cave at the base of the cliff below the bedrock fault, with the remains of Brown's Castle at top left. The IRA unit under siege had one route in and out, the cave entrance always visible in daylight.

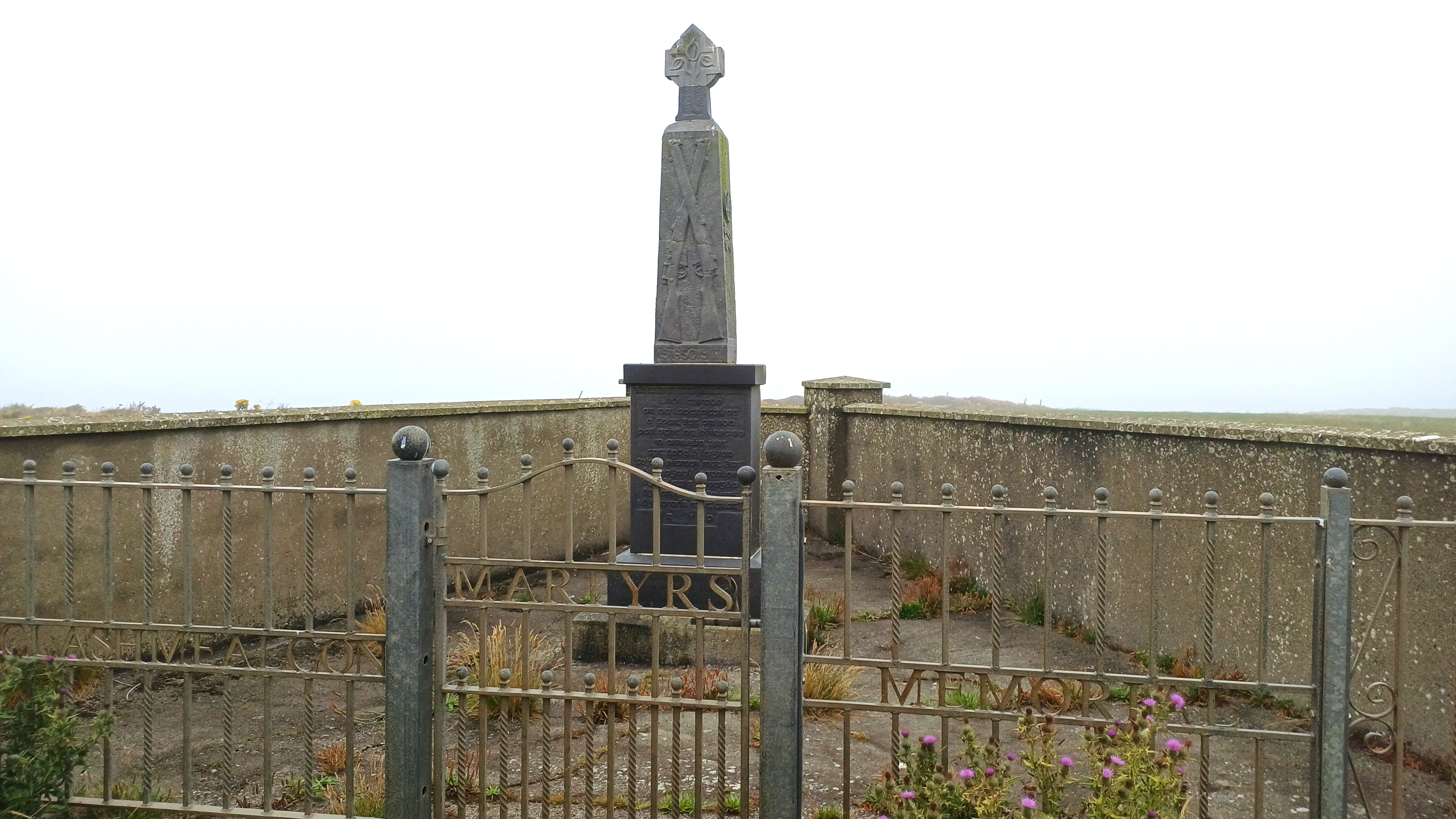
A memorial at Clashmealcon in honour of the Republicans who died there in 1923.

Clashmealcon (Irish: Clais Maolchon) is a townland in the civil parish of Killury in County Kerry. It is best known for being the location of the violent siege at the end of the Irish Civil War as the National Army surrounded an anti-Treaty IRA unit.

== Etymology ==
Clais means 'furrow' in Irish, the remainder representing a name; many different spellings are recorded in Irish and English, including Classmu(e)lcon, Clashmoelchon, and Clossmolchon from the 1600s. Officially, it is Clashmelcon but in most media it is Clashmealcon; sometimes it's called by the abbreviation 'Clash'.

== Geology and Natural History ==
The geology of Clashmealcon is sandstone-mudstone in origin, typical of Kerry Head; there are three underlying bands of bedrock, split by faulting: the Inishaboy Formation (sandstone, siltstone and mudstone), the Kilmore Formation (yellow-olive mudstone to sandstone) and the Clashmealcon Lower Limestone Shale (sandstone, mudstone and thin dark limestone). The cliff area of Clashmealcon is composed mostly of the limestone shale - towards the west - with the remainder being of the Kilmore Formation. The rock was laid down between 358 and 347 million years ago in the Tournaisian age of the early Carboniferous period, viewed as the result of ancient flood plains with plant growth in which the water table rose, including the progressive inundation of an estuary by the sea; the fossils increase in diversity with each overlying layer of the Limestone Shale.

Powerful weathering along the Atlantic coast has produced areas of rocky pavement washed by the tide and undercut sections along rugged cliffs, which are approximately 25 metres high, including Kippin's rock - an isolated stack - caves, holes and Poll Tarbh blowhole, and small, sandy, gravelly areas of foreshore. Fulmar and choughs nest along the cliffs, amongst other species. The land is mostly given to farming, consisting of grassland and shrubland, typically for cattle and horses, which occasionally make it to the caves.

== History ==
Clashmealcon contains two historical ringforts (52.456745, -9.737354)(52.463374, -9.729138), two souterrains (52.463565, -9.735106)(52.463374, -9.729138 ), an abandoned lead mine (52.456951, -9.752666) and enclosure (52.456668, -9.753538) by Poll Tarbh blowhole (the continued erosion of which may have ended the mining operation), another coastal enclosure (52.467239, -9.743861), a burial ground (52.464401, -9.747340), the remains of Brown(e)'s Castle (52.468516, -9.743853) which lie within an earlier promontory fort (52.468646, -9.744138), and there are three further coastal promontory forts (52.462605, -9.748432)(52.466533, -9.744790)(52.472614, -9.731046). Brown's Castle, which had three storeys, may have been built by the pirate Brown family in the 15th century. Hickson (1841) and Westropp (1909) reported on what was significantly more but rapidly deteriorating remains; all that is extant is a tiny section of the north wall including a part of a spiral staircase.

On the 1670 Down Survey map, the name is Claisk Malka. In the Down Survey itself, it is written Clossmolchon. The owner in 1641 was John Browne, who owned 46 townlands, mostly in Mayo, but also in Kerry (including five more in the parish of Killury), Cork and Wexford. Browne became a colonel in the Irish Army but was indebted (well before the Williamite-Jacobite war), having put aside assets to repay his debts; in 1670, he had no townlands left to his name. Clashmealcon was now the property of Captain Robert Oliver, who fought for Cromwell and gained 37 townlands to add to his original 7 in Kerry and Limerick. Clashmealcon was recorded as having 319 profitable hectares and 39 unprofitable.

The Griffith's Valuation documents show that most of the townland's valuation areas (and many beyond) were let directly by Wilson Gun of Rattoo, J.P. and high sheriff of Kerry in 1846. The associated map of Killury (see detail) shows a larger footprint for the remains of Brown's castle and that even Kippin Rock - used only by seabirds - was valuated.

== Civil War siege ==
In April 1923, an anti-treaty IRA unit, led by Timothy "Aeroplane" Lyons, attacked National Army troops at nearby Meenogahane. The troops quickly received reinforcements. Lyons' unit, numbering six, went towards the cliffs at nearby Clashmealcon where they were surrounded by about 200 soldiers of the 1st Western Division. They clambered down the cliff. Below the cliff shelf at the bedrock faultline is a cave (variously referred to as 'Dumfort's', 'Dunfort's' or 'Dunworth's Cave') and other undercuts and smaller caves are around near the water's edge. Two National Army soldiers, part of a group trying to access the cave, were killed by gunfire from within: volunteer James O'Neill - killed instantly - and lieutenant Henry Pierson, who was eventually rescued hours after being shot in the legs but died later in hospital in Tralee. Tom McGrath and Patrick O'Shea tried to climb the cliffs to escape on the night of 16th April but fell in to the sea, presumed drowned, their bodies never recovered. A surrender was agreed and Lyons, the last to surrender on the 18th April, fell on to the rocks while climbing a rope provided by National troops and was finished off with volleys of gunfire, his body left to the sea. His colleagues Edmond Greaney, James McEnery and Reginald Stephen Hathaway had already surrendered but were executed on 25 April.
