= Ballyseedy =

Townland in County Kerry, Ireland

Ballyseedy Bailte Ó Síoda
- Townland
- Location in Ireland
- Coordinates: 52°15′14″N 9°39′25″W
- Country: Ireland
- Province: Munster
- County: County Kerry

Area
  - Total: 14 km^{2} (5.4 sq mi)

Population (2011)
  - Total: 83
  - Density: 5.9/km^{2} (15/sq mi)
- Time zone: UTC+0 (WET)
  - Summer (DST): UTC-1 (IST (WEST))
- Irish Grid Reference: Q869126

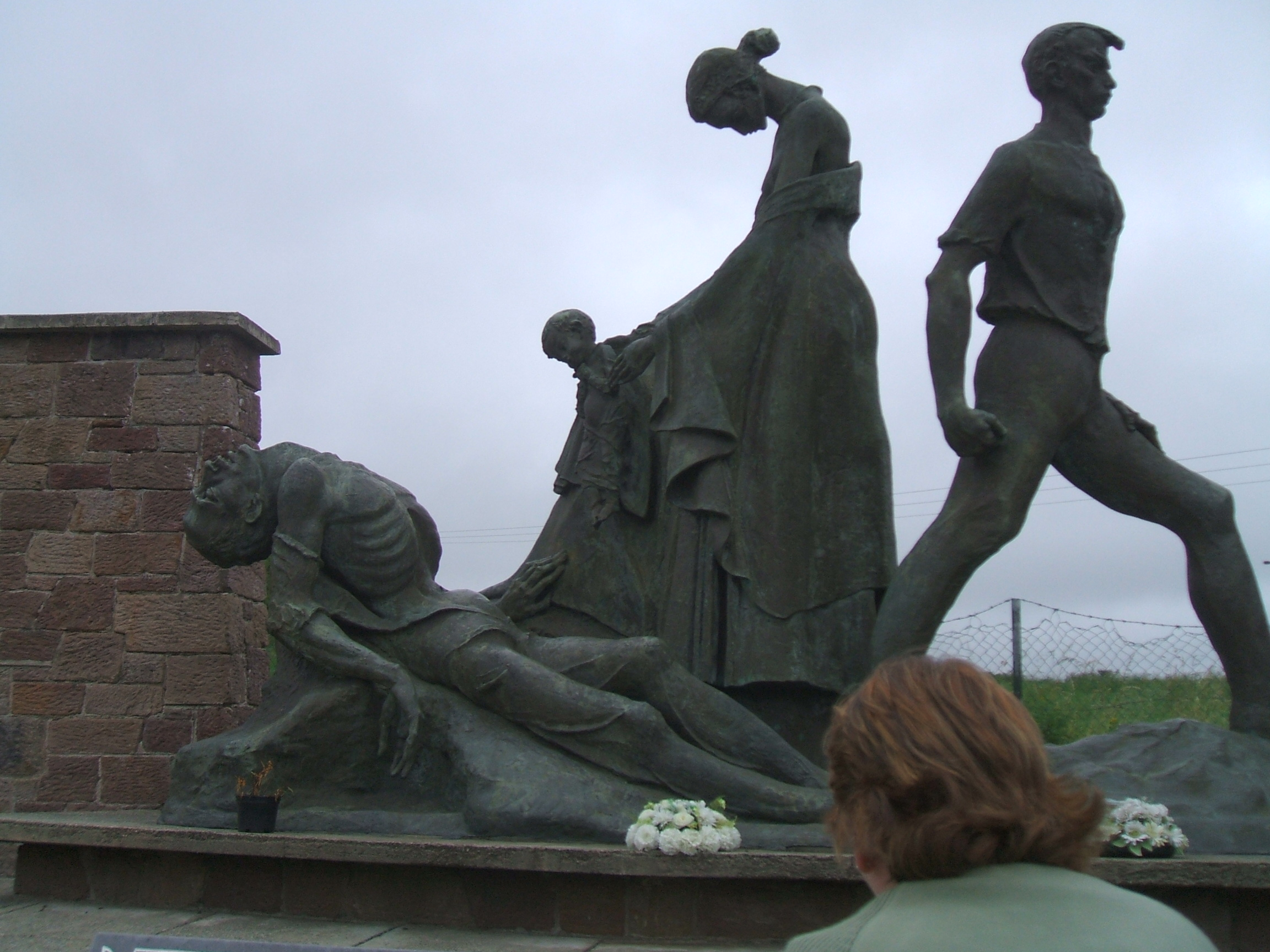
Yann Goulet's Ballyseedy Memorial, County Kerry, Ireland

Ballyseedy (Irish: Bailte Ó Síoda, meaning 'town of Sheedy') is a townland in County Kerry, Ireland. It is situated in the civil parish of the same name, within the historical barony of Trughanacmy. The townland contains a number of notable landmarks, including Ballyseedy Wood, a bridge over the Ballycarty River and a ruined Protestant church. There is also a large restored castle, Ballyseedy Castle, which is in use as a hotel.

== Location ==
Ballyseedy is located off the N21 road, 4 kilometres (2.5 mi) southeast of Tralee. A section of the River Lee, from which Tralee takes its name, forms the northern edge of the townland.

== History ==
Ballyseedy Wood is an ancient woodland dating at least to the 16th century, when it was mapped by Sir Edward Denny. The wood contains the ruins of Ballyseedy House (or Old Ballyseedy Castle). Alongside nearby "New" Ballyseedy Castle (now restored as a hotel). The main S block was remodelled in medieval-revival style by James Franklin Fuller. This was the seat of the Blennerhassett family from around 1586 to 1967.

=== Ballyseedy massacre ===
The townland was the scene of an atrocity in the Irish Civil War in which eight anti-Treaty IRA prisoners were killed by their captors, members of the Free State forces. The lone survivor was Stephen Fuller TD.

== Demographics ==
As of the 2011 census, Ballyseedy townland had a population of 83 people. The surrounding electoral division, Ballyseedy Electoral Division, had a population of 127 in 2002 and of 474 as of the 2006 census.

== See also ==
- List of towns and villages in Ireland
- List of baronies of Ireland
