= Irish Military Archives =

The Irish Military Archives is the official depository for the records of the Irish Department of Defence, the Defence Forces, and the Army Pensions Board, as established by the National Archives Act of 1986.—The function of the archive is to collect, preserve, and make available material relating to the history of the development of the Defence Forces from the formation of the Irish Volunteers in November 1913 to the present day, including overseas service with the United Nations from 1958.

The archives is located in Cathal Brugha Barracks, Rathmines, Dublin.

== Collections ==
=== Bureau of Military History ===
Among the archive's collections is that of the Bureau of Military History (1913–21) comprising witness statements, contemporary documents, photographs, press-cuttings and voice recordings, compiled between 1947–1957. It is available to view online.

=== Military Service Pensions Collection ===
Two components of the Military Service Pensions Collection have also been launched online. It was described by Professor Diarmuid Ferriter as providing "the final key to the inner life and activity of the revolutionary organisations".

The first two phases which are now online and form part of the Military Service Pensions Collection contain over 600,000 pages documenting the revolutionary period of 1916–1923. The collection was made available on a phased basis leading to 2016.

=== Other collections ===
- Michael Collins papers 1919–21
- Liaison Documents (British Evacuation and Truce)
- Civil War operations and intelligence reports
- Captured Documents Irish Republican Army 1922–24
- The Army Crisis 1924
- Volunteer Force Files
- Emergency Defence Plans 1939–46
- Military Intelligence 1939–46 and records of the Office of the Controller of Censorship
- Internment Camps
- Department of Defence files 1939–46
- Directorate of Operations
- Air Corps and Naval Service
- Bureau of Military History
- Military Census of the National Army Nov 1922.
- An tÓglach Journal 1918-1933
