= Ballymullen Barracks =

Military installation in Tralee, Ireland

- Dún Bhaile an Mhuilinn
- Tralee, County Kerry
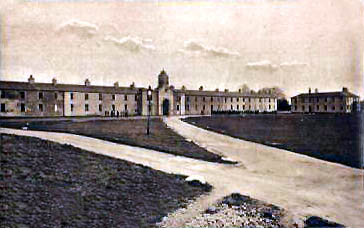
- Ballymullen Barracks, c.1890

Site information
- Type: Barracks
- Operator: (Republic of Ireland) Irish Army

Location
- Location within Ireland
- Coordinates: 52.2622°N 9.6923°W

Site history
- Built: 1809-1812
- Built for: War Office
- In use: British Army (1812-1922); Irish Defence Forces (1922-present)

Garrison information
- Garrison: Royal Munster Fusiliers (1881-1922); 1 (Southern) Brigade (1922-present)

Ballymullen Barracks (Irish: Dún Bhaile an Mhuilinn) is an Irish military installation at Tralee, County Kerry in Ireland.

== History ==
=== Royal Munster Fusiliers ===
The barracks were built for local militia units between 1810 and 1815. In 1873, a system of recruiting areas based on counties was instituted under the Cardwell Reforms and the barracks became the depot for the 101st Regiment of Foot (Royal Bengal Fusiliers) and 104th Regiment of Foot (Bengal Fusiliers). Following the Childers Reforms, the 101st and 104th regiments amalgamated to form the Royal Munster Fusiliers with its depot in the barracks in 1881.

=== Civil War ===
The Royal Munster Fusiliers were disbanded at the time at the establishment of the Irish Free State in 1922. The barracks were taken over by the Irish Republican Army in February 1922 and then secured by the forces of the Free State in August 1922 during the Irish Civil War.

The barracks played a role in one of the most infamous incidents of the war, namely the Ballyseedy massacre. On 6 and 7 March 1923, nine Republican prisoners were taken from the barracks in Tralee to Ballyseedy crossroads and tied to a land mine which was detonated killing all but one.

=== Later use ===
The barracks continued to be used by the Irish Army and a newly refurbished headquarters block was opened at the barracks in April 2002.

=== Non-military usage ===
The site was used as a reception centre for asylum seekers until the centre closed in 2005.

The barracks was also used as a COVID-19 testing centre during the COVID-19 pandemic in the Republic of Ireland.

In 2022, the barracks was used to house Ukrainian refugees following the 2022 Russian invasion of Ukraine.

== Units ==
As of 2023, the barracks was home to E Company of the 12 Infantry Battalion of the Army Reserve.

== See also ==
- List of Irish military installations
