= Irish White Cross =

Relief organisation, active 1921–1928

"Report of the Irish White Cross to 31st August, 1922"

The Irish White Cross was established on 1 February 1921 after the Red Cross (based in Geneva) refused Irish requests for help. It served as a mechanism for distributing funds raised by the American Committee for Relief in Ireland.

It was managed by the Quaker businessman, and later Irish Free State senator, James G. Douglas. Maire Comerford was a member of the General Council of the Irish White Cross who traveled throughout Ireland organizing committees for the collection and distribution of relief funds.

The White Cross continued to operate until the Irish Civil War and its books were officially closed in 1928. From 1922 its activities were essentially wound down and remaining funds divested to subsidiary organizations. The longest running of these aid committees was the Children's Relief Association which distributed aid to child victims of this troubled period, north and south of the border, until 1947.

== Bibliography ==
- Douglas, James G. Ed. J. Anthony Gaughan: Memoirs of Senator James G. Douglas- Concerned Citizen: University College Dublin Press: 1998: ISBN 1-900621-19-3
- Report of American Committee for Relief in Ireland: Internet Archive
- Report of the Irish White Cross to 31 August, 1922 : Internet Archive
- Elizabeth, Helen: The Largest Amount of Good: Quaker Relief in Ireland, 1654–1921 : 1993 : ISBN 0-7735-0959-3
- Ceannt, Áinne B.É : Irish White Cross 1920–47 – The Story of its Work : Pub. 'At the Sign of the Three Candles' : Dublin : 1947? National Library of Ireland Call No. Ir 361c2
