= Paddy Daly =

Irish revolutionary and soldier (1888–1957)

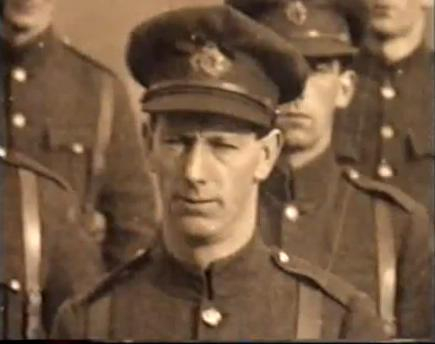
- Daly in 1922
- Born: 5 June 1888; Dublin, Ireland
- Died: 16 January 1957 (aged 68); Dublin
- Burial place: Mount Jerome cemetery
- Other name: Paddy O'Daly
- Spouses: Daisy Gillies (m. 1910; died 1919) Bridget Murtagh (m. 1921; died 1930) Norah Gillies (m. 1934; died 1936)
- Children: 4
- Military career
- Allegiance: Irish Republic; Irish Free State
- Service: Irish Volunteers; Irish Republican Army; National Army; Defence Forces
- Service years: 1913–1924, 1941-1946
- Rank: Major general (National Army); Captain (Defence Forces)
- Units: The Squad; Construction Corps
- Commands: OC Dublin Guards; GOC Kerry Command
- Conflicts: Easter Rising; Irish War of Independence; Irish Civil War; The Emergency

Patrick Daly (5 June 1888 – 16 January 1957), sometimes referred to as O'Daly, served in the Irish Republican Army during the Irish War of Independence and subsequently held the rank of major-general in the Irish National Army from 1922 to 1924. During the Irish Civil War, he was implicated in the murder and cover-up of a number of Anti-Treaty IRA prisoners in County Kerry.

== Easter Rising ==
Daly was born in Dublin on 5 June 1888. He fought in the 1916 Easter Rising under the command of his namesake Ned Daly, leading the unsuccessful attempt to destroy the Magazine Fort in the Phoenix Park. He was later wounded in the particularly vicious fighting near the Linenhall. He was subsequently interned in Frongoch internment camp for his part in the rebellion until 1916, when he was released as part of a general amnesty for Irish prisoners.

== War of Independence ==
In the War of Independence (1919–1921), he served as leader of the "Squad", Michael Collins' assassination unit.

On 19 December 1919, Daly along with Dan Breen led an abortive ambush, at Ashtown railway station near the Phoenix Park, on the British Viceroy, Lord Lieutenant of Ireland and Supreme Commander of the British Army in Ireland, Lord French, as he returned from a private party which he had hosted the previous evening at his country residence in Frenchpark, County Roscommon. Lord French escaped the ambush but Martin Savage was shot dead.

Daly and the men under his command were responsible for the killing of many British intelligence officers, in particular District Inspector Redmond, who had been putting increasing pressure on the squad. Daly himself personally killed several people, including Frank Brooke, director of Great Southern and Eastern Railway, who served on an advisory council to the British military, in June 1920. He did not directly lead any of the attacks on Bloody Sunday but was on standby in one of the Squad's safe houses. In the aftermath, 23 November 1920, he was arrested and interned in Ballykinlar Camp in County Down.

He was released on parole from Ballykinlar in March 1921 – the British apparently being unaware of his senior position within the Dublin Brigade of the IRA. After his release, Daly, along with Emmet Dalton, was also involved in the attempt to free Sean Mac Eoin from Mountjoy Prison on 14 May 1921. He and his men hijacked a British Army Peerless armoured car in Clontarf at the corporation abattoir, while it was escorting a consignment of meat to a barracks and shot dead two soldiers in the process. The plan involved Dalton and Joe Leonard impersonating two British army officers (wearing Dalton's uniforms from his days as a soldier during World War I) and using forged documents to "transfer" MacEoin to Dublin Castle. They gained entry to Mountjoy, but were discovered before they could free MacEoin and had to shoot their way out. They later abandoned the armoured car after removing the Hotchkiss machine guns and setting fire to what they could. Towards the end of the war, in May 1921, the two principal fighting units of the IRA's Dublin Brigade, the "Squad" and the "Active Service Unit" were amalgamated after losses suffered in the Burning of the Custom House. Daly was put named Officer commanding (OC) of this new unit, which was named the Dublin Guard.

Daly's own account of his activities during the War of Independence is held at the Bureau of Military History in Cathal Brugha Barracks.

== Civil War ==
After the Anglo-Irish Treaty split the IRA, Daly and most of his men sided with the pro-treaty party, who went on to found the Irish Free State. He was appointed to the rank of Brigadier in the newly created Irish National Army, which was inaugurated in January 1922. When the Irish Civil War broke out in June 1922, Daly commanded the Free State's troops who secured Dublin, after a week's fighting.

In August 1922, during the Irish Free State offensive that re-took most of the major towns in Ireland, Daly commanded a landing of 450 troops of the Dublin Guard at Fenit, County Kerry which went on to capture Tralee from the anti-treaty forces. Acting with severe brutality in Kerry, Daly commented: "Nobody had asked me to take kid-gloves to Kerry, so I didn't". As the Civil War developed into a vicious guerrilla conflict, Daly and his men were implicated in series of atrocities against anti-treaty prisoners (see Executions during the Irish Civil War), culminating in a series of killings with landmines in March 1923. Daly, and others under his command, claimed that those killed were accidentally blown up by their own mines. Statements by the Garda Síochána (stymied from procuring evidence), two Free State lieutenants on duty – W. McCarthy and Niall Harrington – and one survivor, Stephen Fuller, maintained the claims were fabricated. Daly was "always close at hand" when inquests were held, twisting the circumstances of prisoner deaths in "the most brazen way".

== Subsequent career ==
Daly resigned from the Free State army in 1924 after an incident in Kenmare, Kerry, concerning the daughters of a doctor. A court martial was held but collapsed as no one was prepared to give evidence.

During The Emergency, he re-enlisted in the Irish Army again in 1940 with the rank of captain serving in non-combatant Construction Corps.

== Personal life and death ==
Daly was a carpenter by trade. Daly married Daisy Gillies in 1910. His brother James (Seamus) married Daisy's sister Nora, a Cumann na mBan activist, in a joint wedding ceremony. After Daisy's death in 1919, Daly married Bridget Murtagh, also a Cumann na mBan activist, in 1921. Murtagh and Nora O'Daly had carried out intelligence gathering for the planned attack on the Magazine Fort in 1916. She was a sister of Elizabeth Murtagh, the first wife of Commandant Michael Love who served with Daly in the Collins Squad of the IRA, in the Irish Free State Army of the 1920s and during the Emergency period. Murtagh died in childbirth in 1930. Daly subsequently married Norah Gillies, his first wife's niece, in 1934 and had one daughter together. Gillies died in 1936.

On his death in 16 January 1957 he was buried with full military honours in Mount Jerome cemetery. He was survived by his brothers, Commandant Seamus O'Daly and Captain Frank O'Daly, his sons Patrick and Colbert, and his daughters Brede and Philomena.

== Bibliography ==
- Duggan, John A History of the Irish Army(1991)
- Ireland's Civil War, Calton Younger (1966)
- Green Against Green, Michael Hopkinson
- The Squad, T Ryle Dwyer (2005)
- Kerry Landings, Harrington.
