= Battle of Dublin =

1922 opening battle of the Irish Civil War

Coordinates: 53.3428°N 6.2661°W

- Part of the Irish Civil War
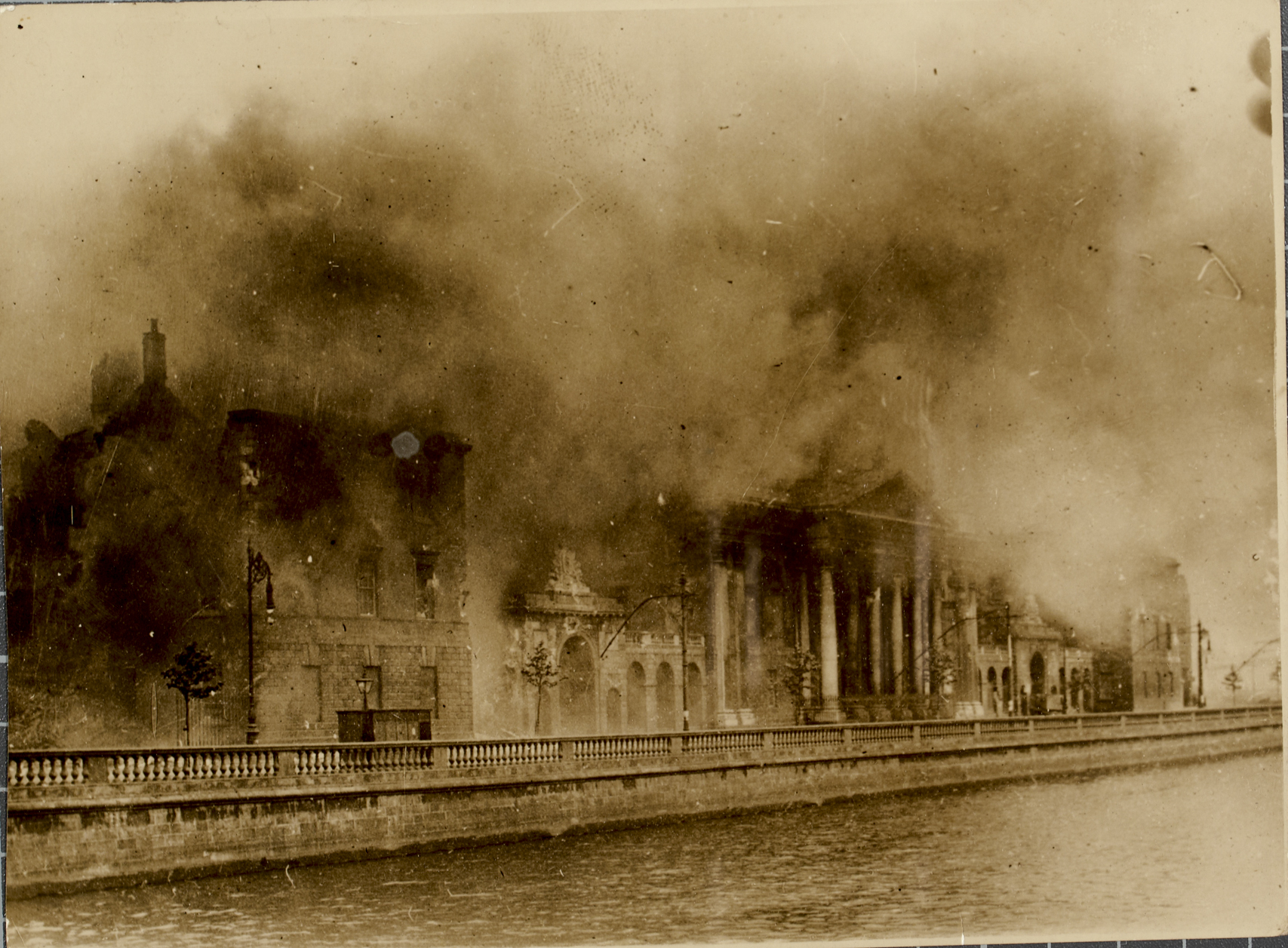
- The Four Courts ablaze during the battle, 30 June 1922
Date	28 June – 5 July 1922 (1 week)
Location	Central Dublin
Result	Provisional Government victory: Beginning of the Irish Civil War

Belligerents
Anti-Treaty IRA; Irish Citizen Army	Provisional Government: National Army

Commanders and leaders
Cathal Brugha †; Oscar Traynor; Paddy O'Brien; Ernie O'Malley	Michael Collins; Paddy Daly; Tom Ennis

Strength
200 troops in Four Courts; ~500 more in city	4,000 troops

Casualties and losses
At least 15 killed; Unknown number wounded; Over 450 captured	At least 29 killed; 150 wounded
- At least 35 civilians killed; Over 100 wounded

The Battle of Dublin was a week of street battles in Dublin from 28 June to 5 July 1922 that marked the beginning of the Irish Civil War. Six months after the Anglo-Irish Treaty ended the recent Irish War of Independence, it was fought between the forces of the new Provisional Government and a section of the Irish Republican Army (IRA) that opposed the Treaty.

The Irish Citizen Army also became involved in the battle, having supported the anti-Treaty IRA in the O'Connell Street area. The fighting began with an assault by Provisional Government forces on the Four Courts building, and ended in a decisive victory for the Provisional Government.

== Background ==
On 14 April 1922 about 200 Anti-Treaty IRA militants, with Rory O'Connor as their spokesman, occupied the Four Courts in Dublin, resulting in a tense stand-off. They wanted to spark a new armed confrontation with the British, which they hoped would bring down the Anglo-Irish Treaty, unite the two factions of the IRA against their former common enemy and restart the fight to create an all-Ireland Irish Republic. At the time the British Army still had thousands of soldiers concentrated in Dublin, awaiting evacuation.

Winston Churchill and the British cabinet had been applying pressure on the Provisional Government to dislodge the rebels in the Four Courts, as they considered their presence a violation of the Treaty. Such pressure fell heaviest on Michael Collins, President of the Provisional Government Cabinet and effective head of the regular National Army. Collins, a chief IRA strategist during the War of Independence from Britain, had resisted giving open battle to the anti-Treaty militants since they had first occupied Four Courts the preceding April. His colleagues in the Provisional Government Cabinet, including Arthur Griffith, agreed that Collins must mount decisive military action against them.

In June 1922 the Provisional Government engaged in intense negotiations with the British Cabinet over a draft Constitution that sought to avert the impending civil war. They particularly sought to remove the requirement of an oath to the British Crown by all members of the Dublin government, a key point of contention with anti-Treaty partisans. However, the conservative British Cabinet refused to cooperate. The pro-treaty element of Sinn Féin won the elections on 16 June.

Following the assassination of Sir Henry Wilson in London on 22 June 1922 and the arrest by Four Courts troops of Free State Army Deputy Chief of Staff Gen. J.J. O'Connell, British pressure on the Provisional Government intensified. The British now threatened to invade and re-occupy all of Ireland. In a 12 May 1922 meeting, Churchill's Under-Secretary for Ireland Alfred Cope stated that the anti-treaty IRA leader Rory O'Connor had planned to force the British Army to reengage in Ireland and resulting reunion of Republican forces. On 27 June, the Irish Provisional Government Cabinet agreed on an ultimatum to the Four Courts garrison to evacuate or face immediate military action.

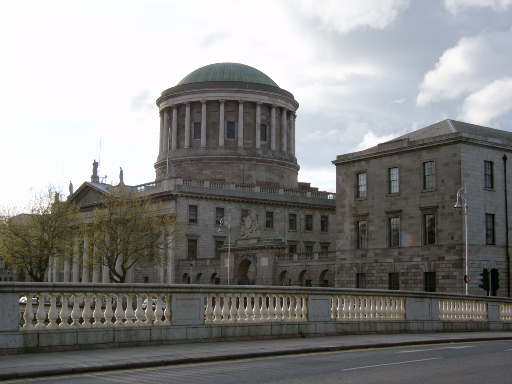
The Four Courts, seen from its eastern side.

Churchill offered a loan of British artillery for use by the National Army, along with 200 shells from their store of 10,000 at Kilmainham, three miles away. It is possible that some British special troops were also covertly loaned. Two 18-pounder field guns were placed on Bridge St. and Winetavern St., across the River Liffey from the Four Courts complex. After an ultimatum was delivered to the anti-Treaty garrison on the night of 27 June / early hours of 28 June, the National Army commenced the bombardment of Four Courts.

No authoritative record exists regarding the order to commence bombardment—when it was issued, by whom, where, etc. Historians have tended to attribute the order to Collins, but some biographers dispute this. Anti-Treaty survivors alleged that they were preparing for an 8:00 a.m. evacuation when the bombardment began at 4:00 a.m.

== Assault on the Four Courts ==
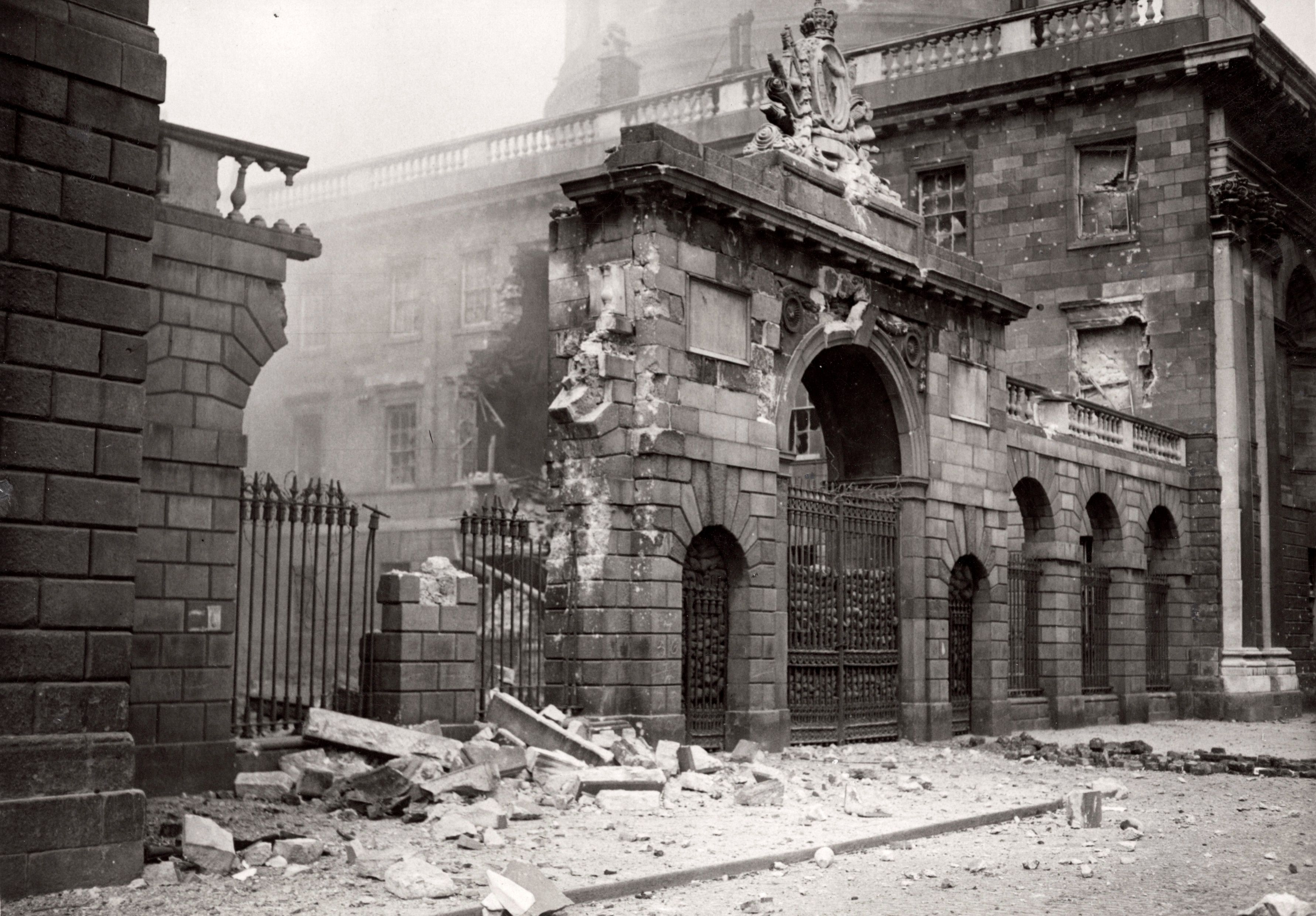
Entrance of the Four Courts damaged by artillery fire

Inside the building were 12 members of the Irish Republican Army Executive, including Chief-of-Staff Joe McKelvey, Director of Engineering Rory O'Connor, Quartermaster General Liam Mellows and Director of Operations Ernie O'Malley. The garrison consisted of roughly 180 men drawn from the 1st and 2nd Battalions of the IRA's 1st Dublin Brigade, commanded by Commandant Paddy O'Brien, armed for the most part only with small arms (rifles, five Thompson submachine guns and two Lewis light machine guns) apart from one captured armoured car, which they named "The Mutineer". The members of the IRA Army Executive were the political leaders of the garrison, but served as common soldiers under the command of O'Brien. The Anti-Treaty side fortified the Four Courts to some extent, planting mines around the complex and barricading the doors and windows, but their leadership ordered them not to fire first, in order to retain the moral high ground, and so the Free State troops were allowed to surround the Four Courts.

After the first day's bombardment proved ineffective, the British gave the Free State two more 18-pounder cannon and proffered BL 60-pounder guns along with an offer to bomb the Four Courts from the air. Collins turned down the latter two offers because of the risk of causing heavy civilian casualties. On the 29th, Free State troops stormed the eastern wing of the Four Courts, losing three killed and 14 wounded and taking 33 prisoners. The republicans' armoured car, "The Mutineer", was disabled and abandoned by its crew. Early the next day O'Brien was injured by shrapnel and O'Malley took over military command in the Four Courts. By this time the shelling had caused the Four Courts to catch fire. In addition, orders arrived from Oscar Traynor, the anti-treaty IRA commander in Dublin, for the Four Courts garrison to surrender, as he could not reach their position to help them. O'Malley ruled this order invalid, as the Four Courts was a GHQ operation. However, in view of the rapidly deteriorating situation, at 3:30 p.m. on 30 June, O'Malley surrendered the Four Courts to Brig. Gen. Paddy Daly of the Free State's Dublin Guard unit. Three of the republican garrison had died in the siege.

=== Public Record Office explosion ===
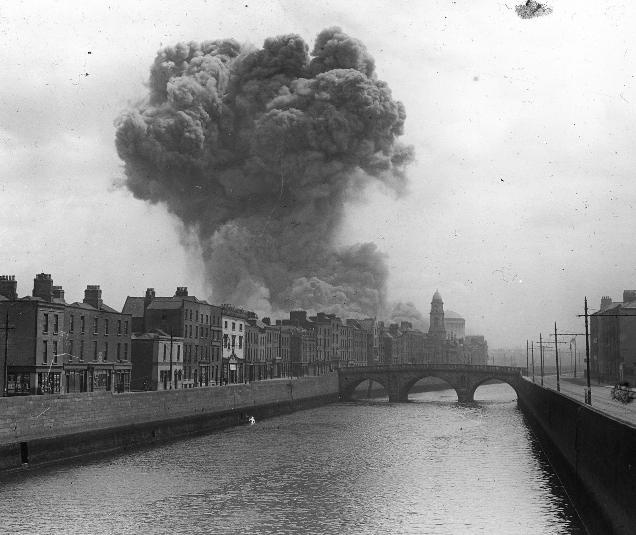
An explosion at the Four Courts during the bombings.

Several hours before the surrender, at either 11:30 or 2:15 the Irish Public Record Office (PRO) block located in the western block of the Four Courts, which had been used as an ammunition store by the Four Courts garrison, was the centre of a huge explosion, destroying Irish state records going back to the Norman conquest. Forty advancing Free State troops were badly injured. The Irish republican women's paramilitary organisation (Cumann na mBan) leader Maire Comerford recalled being blown backwards and forward by the intense blast.

Assigning blame for the explosion remains controversial. It was alleged by the National Army Headquarters that the Anti-treaty forces deliberately booby-trapped the PRO to kill advancing Free State troops. Tim Healy, a government supporter, later claimed that the explosion was the result of land mines, laid before the surrender, exploding afterwards. In contrast, a 2018 study by Michael Fewer found no evidence that the IRA had set off an explosion. This study suggests that the explosion originated from fires, caused by the Four Courts being shelled, which ultimately reached explosive materials stored in the PRO. Justice Ronan Keane, writing about two hundred years of the Four Courts in 1996, observed that there was no evidence to hold the republican side responsible for the explosion, while academic John Regan asserted that a propaganda document produced during the Civil War, which laid responsibility for the explosion at the feet of the anti-treaty side, is not "credible evidence". A towering mushroom cloud rose 200 feet (61 m) over the Four Courts. Calton Younger identified three explosions: "two beneath the Records Office at about 2.15 [pm] and another at the back of the building at about 5 o'clock".

At this stage in the battle troops on each side still had a sense of kinship with the other, as most of them had fought together in the Irish Republican Army during the Irish War of Independence. By appealing to friends on the Free State side, several anti-Treaty leaders among the Four Courts garrison, notably Ernie O'Malley and Seán Lemass, escaped from captivity to continue the fight.

The destruction of irreplaceable historical record in the PRO explosion (and the 1921 burning of the Custom House) has impaired Irish historiography; some had been calendared to varying degrees. The National Archives of Ireland and Irish Manuscripts Commission have assembled and published original documents from other sources to mitigate the loss. A consortium led by Trinity College Dublin is creating the website "Beyond 2022" to provide a "virtual recreation" of the PRO and its contents, in time for the centenary of the explosion.

== O'Connell Street fighting ==
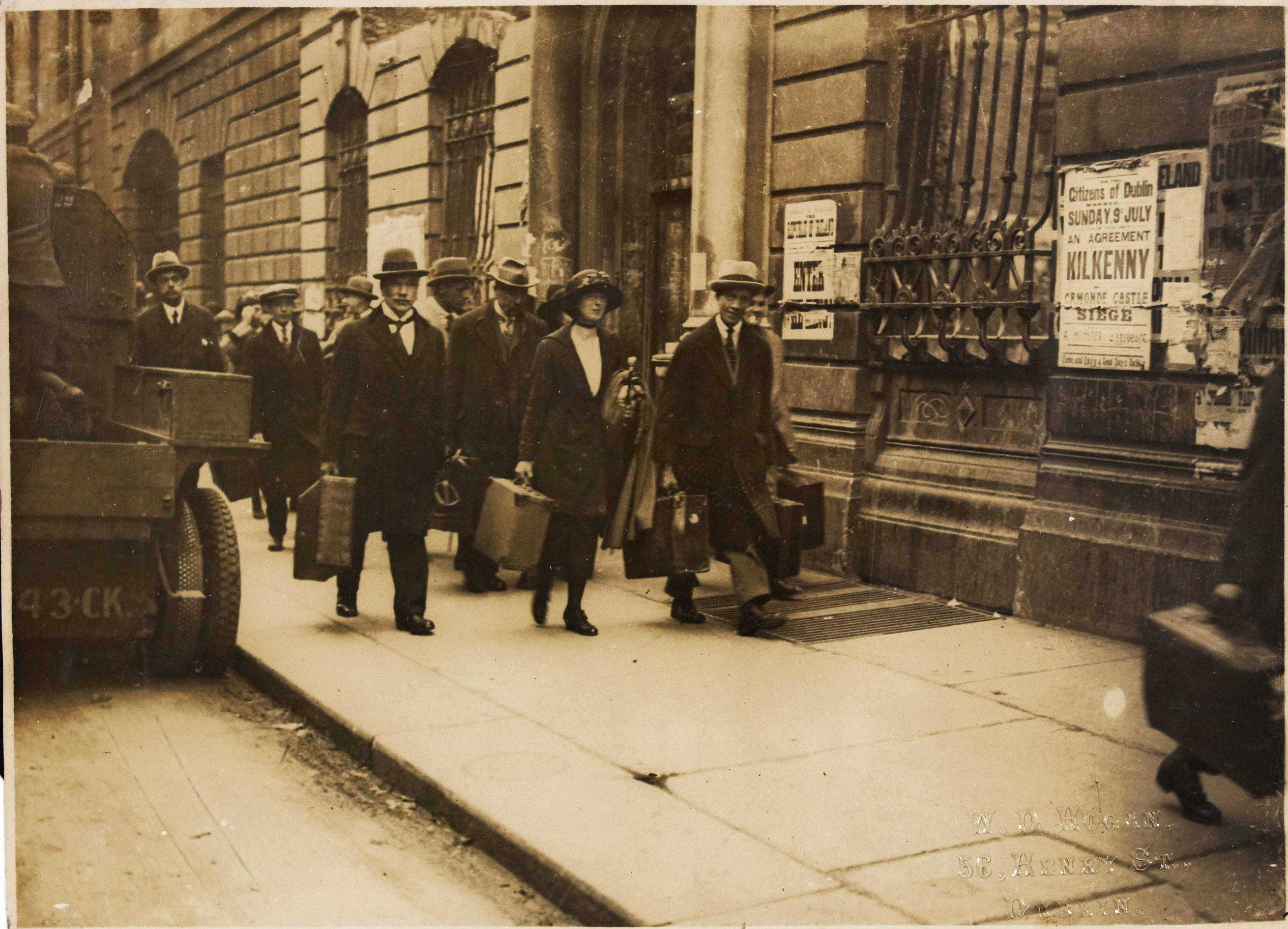
Guests of the Edinburgh Hotel on O'Connell St. make their way from the hotel on 5 July 1922.

Despite the Free State force's success in taking the Four Courts, fighting continued in Dublin until 5 July. On the 29th anti-Treaty IRA units from the Dublin Brigade led by Oscar Traynor had occupied O'Connell Street, part of Parnell Square, York Street and some of other locations to try to distract Free State attention from their attack on the Four Courts. Not all the IRA units in the capital were prepared to fight against the new Irish government, however, and their numbers were probably about 500 throughout the city. Their numbers were supplemented by about 150 Citizen Army men and women who brought with them arms and ammunition dumped since the insurrection of Easter 1916.

The republicans occupied the northeastern part of O'Connell St., with their strong point at "the block", a group of buildings that the Anti-Treatyites had connected by tunneling through the walls. They had also taken over the adjoining Gresham, Crown, Granville and Hammam hotels. Their only position on the western side of the street was in the YMCA building. Additionally, they had an outpost south of the Liffey at the Swan Pub on Aungier St. Oscar Traynor apparently hoped to receive reinforcements from the rest of the country, but only Anti-Treaty units in Belfast and Tipperary replied and both of them arrived too late to take part in the fighting.

The Provisional Government troops, commanded by Gen. Tom Ennis, started by clearing out the outlying anti-treaty garrisons, which was accomplished by 1 July. They then drew a tighter cordon around O'Connell St. Artillery was used to drive the Anti-Treaty fighters out of positions on Parnell St. and Gardiner St., which gave the Free State troops a clear field of fire down O'Connell St.

The republican outpost in the YMCA was eliminated when Free State troops tunnelled underneath it and detonated a bomb. Traynor's men in "the block" held out until artillery was brought up, under the cover of armored cars, to bombard them at point-blank range. Incendiary bombs were also planted in the buildings. Traynor and most of his force (70 men and 30 women) made their escape when the buildings they were occupying caught fire. They mingled with civilian crowds and made their way to Blessington.

Left behind was Republican leader Cathal Brugha and a rear guard of 15 men, who stayed behind in the Hammam Hotel after Traynor and most other IRA men had left. At 5:00 p.m. on 5 July, when the fires made the hotel untenable, Brugha ordered his men to surrender. He, however, stayed behind, only to emerge from the building alone, armed with a revolver. He was shot in the thigh by Free State troops and died later from blood loss. Kathleen Barry (the sister of executed IRA man Kevin Barry) and Cumann na mBan member Linda Kearns were with Brugha when he died. There were some further sporadic incidents of fighting around the city as Free State troops dispersed anti-treaty IRA groups.

Cathal Brugha was the last casualty in the battle for Dublin, which had cost the lives of at least 80 people (15 anti-Treaty IRA Volunteers, 29 National Army soldiers, one British Royal Air Force serviceman and 35 civilians) and over 280 wounded. In addition, the Free State took over 450 Republican prisoners. The high civilian casualties were doubtless the result of the use of heavy weapons, especially artillery, in a densely populated urban area.

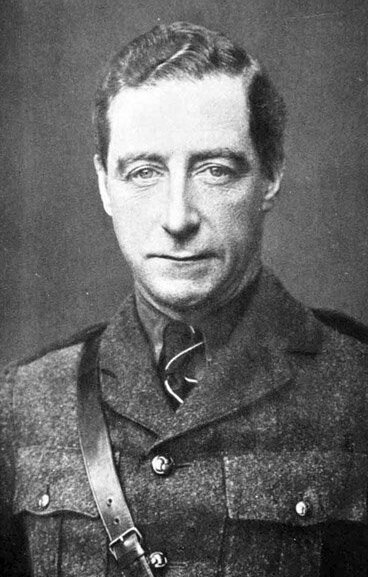
Cathal Brugha, Anti-Treaty leader killed during the fighting on Dublin's O'Connell St.

== Aftermath ==
When the fighting in Dublin died down, the Free State government was left firmly in control of the Irish capital and the anti-treaty forces dispersed around the country. Round-ups after the fighting resulted in more Republican prisoners and the death of prominent anti-Treaty activist Harry Boland who was shot dead in Skerries, County Dublin on 31 July.

Oscar Traynor, Ernie O'Malley and the other anti-Treaty fighters who had escaped the fighting in Dublin regrouped in Blessington, around 30 km south-west of the city. An anti-Treaty IRA force from County Tipperary had arrived there but too late to participate in the Dublin fighting. Instead, this force headed south and took a string of towns, including Enniscorthy and Carlow, but quickly abandoned them when faced with superior Free State forces. Most of the Republicans then retreated further south again to the so-called Munster Republic, territory south-west of a line running from Limerick to Waterford. This in turn was taken by the Free State in an offensive from July to August 1922.

Four of the Republican leaders captured in the Four Courts, Rory O'Connor, Liam Mellows, Joe McKelvey and Richard Barrett, were later executed by the government in reprisal for the Anti-Treaty side's killing of TD (member of Parliament) Seán Hales. (See Executions during the Irish Civil War.) The street where Cathal Brugha was killed was later renamed Cathal Brugha Street in his honour.

== Sources ==
- Collins, M.E. (1993). Ireland 1868–1966. Dublin: Educational Company of Ireland. ISBN 978-0-86167-305-6.
- Coogan, Tim Pat (1990). Michael Collins: A Biography. Penguin Random House. ISBN 978-1-78475-326-9.
- Coogan, Tim Pat (1995). De Valera – Long Fellow, Long Shadow. Hutchinson. ISBN 978-0-09-175030-5.
- Dorney, John (19 June 2012). "Casualties of the Irish Civil War in Dublin". theirishstory.com.
- Dorney, John (2017). The Civil War in Dublin: The Fight for the Irish Capital, 1922–1924. Merrion Press. ISBN 978-1-78537-089-2.
- Feehan, John M (1981). The Shooting of Michael Collins: Murder or Accident?. Cork: Mercier. ISBN 978-0-946645-03-9.
- Gillis, Liz (2012). The Fall of Dublin. Mercier. ISBN 978-1-85635-680-0.
- Hopkinson, Michael (2004). Green against Green – the Irish Civil War. Gill & Macmillan Ltd. ISBN 978-0-7171-5819-5.
- Macardle, Dorothy (1965). The Irish Republic. New York: Farrar, Straus and Giroux.
- Neeson, Eoin (1966). The Civil War in Ireland. Poolbeg. ISBN 978-1-85371-013-1.
- O'Malley, Ernie (1978). The Singing Flame. Dublin: Mercier Press. ISBN 978-1-85635-885-9.
- Ryan, Meda (2012). The Real chief, Liam Lynch. Mercier Press. ISBN 978-1-85635-992-4.
- Sigerson, S M (2013). The Assassination of Michael Collins: What Happened at Béal na mBláth?. CreateSpace Independent Publishing Platform. ISBN 978-1-4937-8471-4.
- Walsh, Paul V (1998). "The Irish Civil War 1922–23 -A Study of the Conventional Phase".
- Younger, Calton (1968). Ireland's Civil War. London: Muller. ISBN 978-0-8008-4240-6.
