= Niall Harrington =

Irish soldier and writer

Niall Charles Harrington
- Born: 23 September 1901; Dublin, Ireland
- Died: 18 September 1981 (aged 79)
- Resting place: Glasnevin Cemetery
- Education: Christian Brothers School, Tralee, Rockwell College, Cashel
- Occupations: Deputy director of intelligence, ghq, union representative
- Employer(s): Irish Army, Directorate of Military Intelligence (Ireland), Federated Union of Employers

Niall Charles Harrington (23 January 1901 – 18 September 1981), born in Dublin, was an Irish soldier, officer, military intelligence director, writer and broadcaster, campaigner for the memory of Charles Stuart Parnell and a union representative. His military career spanned the period from the War of Independence through to his retirement as a senior intelligence officer in 1959. During this time he wrote and narrated various historical features for different media. His Civil War memoirs were developed into a book, Kerry Landing, which was extended and published posthumously.

== Early life ==
He was born at 6 Cavendish Row, Dublin, home of his grandfather Dr. Edward O'Neill. His parents were Elizabeth O'Neill, daughter of Dr.O'Neill, and Timothy Charles Harrington, a Nationalist MP, barrister-at-law and Lord Mayor of Dublin from 1901 to 1903. When he was 9 his father died so he moved to Nelson Street [now Ashe Street], Tralee, County Kerry to live with his uncle Dan, Timothy Harrington's brother. Dan Harrington was the printer and publisher of The Kerry Sentinel, a weekly paper which had been founded by Timothy Harrington in 1877. He attended the Christian Brothers' school in Edward Street, Tralee, and later Rockwell College in County Tipperary.

== Military career ==
After being apprenticed in 1918 to James Barry's pharmacy in Boyle, County Roscommon, Harrington joined the IRA and the IRB. He became First lieutenant in A Company, 1st (Boyle) Battalion, North Roscommon Brigade IRA. A beating and threats from Royal Irish Constabulary (RIC) members encouraged his departure from the area. He was ordered to Dublin to deliver a dispatch and remained there on advice after a secret meeting with Cathal Brugha and Austin Stack, and later a note from Michael Collins. He lived at different addresses and did different jobs before transferring to C Company, 2nd Battalion Dublin Brigade IRA. After the Anglo-Irish Treaty he became a private in the Medical Corps of the Irish Army in March 1922, reprising his pharmacy practice. He was on duty in Dublin when the Provisional Government launched an assault against anti-Treaty IRA 'Irregulars' who had captured the Four Courts. Allowed a posting aboard the Lady Wicklow, he transferred to the Dublin Guard en route. The ship landed at Fenit, County Kerry, on 2 August 1922 as part of an attempt to overcome the anti-Treaty forces controlling the county. His intimate knowledge of the area was utilised in the planning and execution of the landing and the capture of Fenit and Tralee. He received a field-promotion to 2nd Lieutenant for bravery. In 1923 he became captain and gained experience through the ranks in different roles and counties. He graduated from the Military College's Infantry School in 1931, and the Command and Staff School in 1939 becoming commandant, in roles attached to military archives and intelligence. His final military post was as Deputy Director of Intelligence at General Headquarters from 1952 to 1959, in the rank of lieutenant colonel.

== Union representative ==
Upon retiring from his military role, Harrington was appointed National Organiser of the Federated Union of Employers [now part of Ibec], remaining until 1973.

== Parnell Commemoration Association ==
Harrington was secretary, then president of the Parnell Commemoration Association, which existed in honour of Charles Stewart Parnell, the late 19th Century Irish nationalist, land reform agitator and leader of the Home Rule League. Harrington's father, Timothy Harrington, was a close confidant and supporter of Parnell. Harrington senior's Kerry Sentinel newspaper firmly supported the Irish National Land League. Parnell offered him the secretaryship of the Irish National Land League and following that the Irish National League.

Niall Harrington was the principal supporter of the memorial to Parnell now set in Glasnevin Cemetery, Dublin, and of granting public access to Avondale House in County Wicklow – Parnell's birthplace and home – as an Irish heritage centre.

== Writing and broadcasting ==
Harrington wrote and presented a number of different items on 2RN (later Radio Éireann) from the 1930s onwards, and his play, Resurgence – A Cavalcade of the Easter Insurrection, was broadcast in 1937. He also did pieces promoting the army. Amongst his many works for print, he sometimes wrote under the pseudonyms of Niall O'Neill and Brian Mulhern.

His memoirs, entitled A fine day to die in Ireland, meant originally for the military archives, were expanded into the book Kerry Landing under the auspices of his friend, Dan Nolan, of Anvil Books. Nolan appealed for additional information from readers of the Kerryman. The book was eventually published in 1992, after Harrington's death in 1981 and Nolan's in 1989.

In the book, Harrington referred to murders on both sides in the Civil War, including the notorious incidents at Ballyseedy Cross, Countess Bridge, and Bahags, all in County Kerry, where captured Republicans were brutally killed using landmines, bombs and bullets by Free State soldiers of the Dublin Guard. The soldiers were later officially cleared of any wrongdoing. Harrington, who was in the county having recently joined the Dublin Guard, said,

"The facts are that the mines used in the slaughter of the prisoners were constructed in Tralee under the supervision of two senior Dublin Guards officers.

"An alleged military court of inquiry into the occurrences was held in Tralee on 7 April 1923; the submissions made to the court and the findings brought in are, to my personal knowledge, totally untrue."

This conclusion was supported by other accounts, some only released in the 21st century.

== Legacy ==
The collection of Niall Harrington's papers relating to his career, and remaining papers of his father Timothy, were placed with the National Library of Ireland in 2001 and 2002 by his daughter, Nuala Jordan.
