= Kenmare incident =

Assault on two women by Irish army officers in 1923

The Kenmare Incident, as it came to be known, was an attack in June 1923 by Irish Army officers on two young women in their home in Kenmare, County Kerry, Ireland. Two investigations were undertaken, one by the Garda Síochána and one by a Military Court of Inquiry. The latter recommended court-martial proceedings. After the intervention of the Minister for Defence, Richard Mulcahy and the President of the Executive Council (prime minister) W. T. Cosgrave, the court-martial proceedings ended.

== Initial events ==
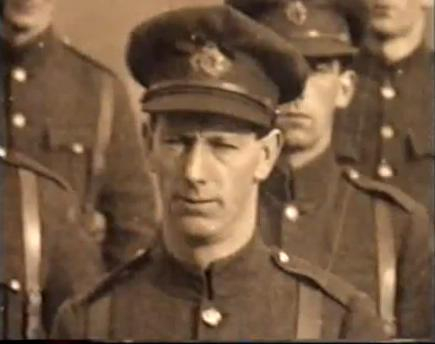
Paddy O'Daly in 1922

The Judge Advocate General Cahir Davitt was called in June 1923 to see a very irritated Adjutant General Gearóid O'Sullivan. He was handed a file, with O'Sullivan saying, "This is the worst yet." It contained details of an attack by Dublin Guards officers on two young women aged 17 and 21.

In the file, it was alleged that three National Army soldiers went to the home of Dr. Randal MacCarthy in Kenmare, County Kerry. They pulled his two young daughters into the garden, used their Sam Browne belts to beat one of them and doused their hair with dirty motor oil or cart grease. Some historians identify this may have been a sexual assault. The act was, apparently, a reprisal.

Civic guards investigated the case and found the three officers who perpetrated the assault were from Kerry Command, based at Ballymullen Barracks, Tralee. None of these officers were tried for the crime. Instead, one of the accused officers was the GOC of Kerry Command, Paddy O'Daly (also known as Paddy Daly), a former member of Michael Collins's Squad. A revolver found at the MacCarthy home was traced to O'Daly. O'Daly later blamed the victims and said they had consorted with British Army officers before the Truce, which was by then two years gone, and that one had 'jilted' an Irish Army officer.

When asked his opinion on the file, Davitt said it called for disciplinary action. O'Sullivan baulked at that by saying that he did not believe the report and cited O'Daly's war record. In discussion, Davitt said if they did not act then the Guards might prosecute, Dr MacCarthy's daughters might sue, and if it was made public that the officers were not disciplined, it could be a catastrophe for the army. In any case, they were duty-bound: the execution of the Civil War itself was predicated on such a principle. O'Sullivan could not square the investigation's details with his personal view of O'Daly and raised the possibility of the Guards' bias, given recent tension between the departments of Justice and Defence. Davitt proposed a Military Court of Inquiry provided the result was acted upon if it supported the Guards' findings.

== Military court ==
An inquiry, presided over by general David Reynolds GOC Cork, was instigated and met in Kenmare on 26th and 29th June 1923. A prima facie case against the three was established. O'Sullivan agreed that a General Court-Martial was now required and proceeded, with Davitt, to select carefully seven officers for the task who were believed to be unbiased either way.

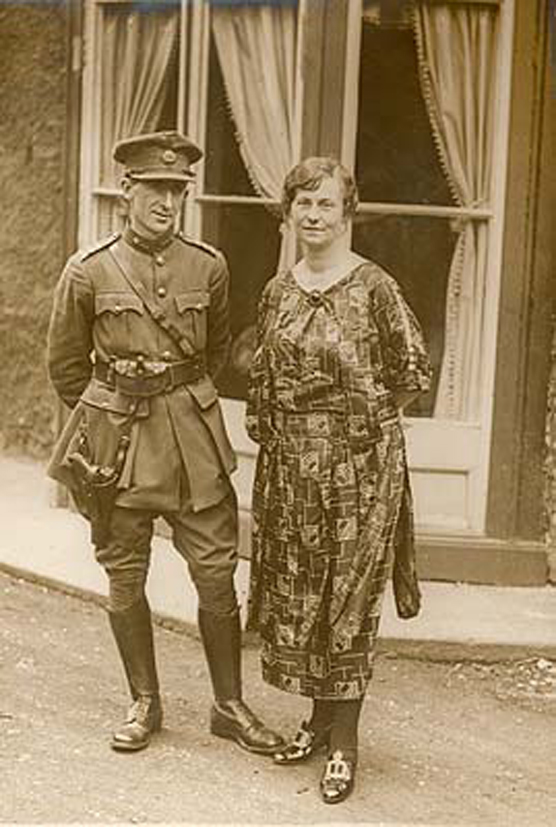
Minister for Defence, Richard Mulcahy, with his wife, Josephine, in 1922

Commander-in-Chief and Minister for Defence Richard Mulcahy asked Davitt if the case was clear cut, which Davitt confirmed. Mulcahy mirrored the initial stated opinion of O'Sullivan by referring to O'Daly's army and national record. Davitt repeated the arguments he used with O'Sullivan. Mulcahy said that O'Daly had avowed his innocence to him personally and that he was minded to take his word and drop the case. Davitt asked if the simple acceptance of someone's word should then apply to all accused officers and what of the other two suspects? Mulcahy bemoaned his predicament. He followed Davitt's suggestion of asking Attorney-General Hugh Kennedy's advice.

== Executive Council reaction ==
To Davitt's amazement, Kennedy said that the evidence was not strong enough to proceed to prosecution. Dismissing the women's testimony, Kennedy told the Executive Council that the women were "not city people and their mentality as witnesses and generally must be considered in the light of their own history and environment". He went on to belittle generally a "Catholic bourgeoisie" of rural social climbers with "British leanings" and found it "humiliating to have to confess" that British officers associated easily with such "girls of this social stratum.... It seems clear that the McCarthys were of this type. Officers of the National Army have been in many cases the butt for people of this kind".

The highly-prejudiced social commentary left the Minister for Justice, Kevin O'Higgins, furious. His own father was a medical doctor from a similar background to the MacCarthys. O'Higgins protested vehemently. He was isolated in his views about the issue and twice threatened to leave the government.

O'Higgins had already spoken to Mulcahy in March 1923 about O'Daly's involvement in the Ballyseedy incident and others in Kerry. The Garda Síochána and two Dublin Guard officers (one who knew O'Higgins personally) stated that O'Daly was instrumental in the brutal murders of Republican prisoners. Mulcahy was equally nonplussed then.

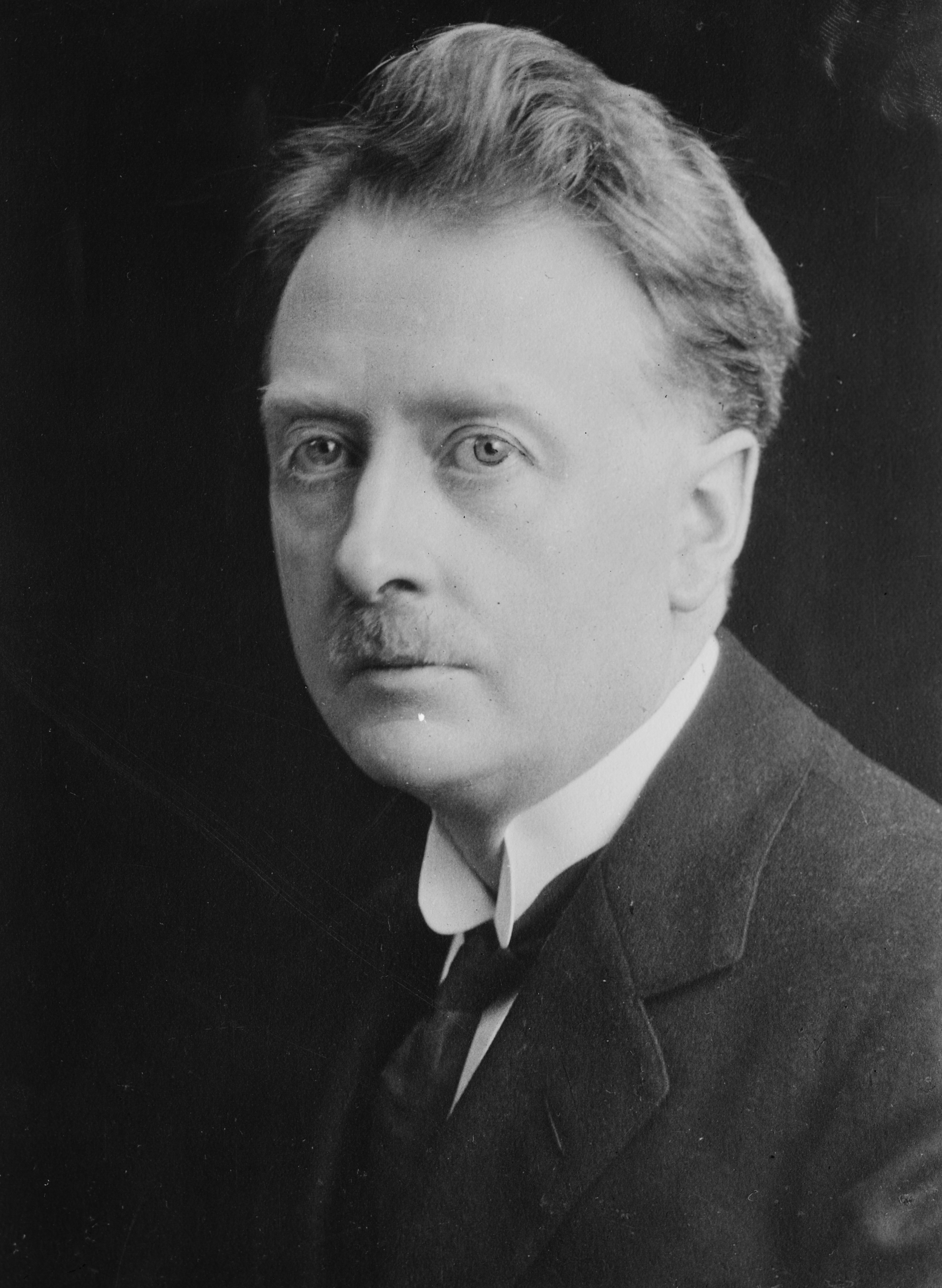
W.T..Cosgrave, leader of the Irish Government in 1923.

W.T. Cosgrave later wrote to Dr MacCarthy to suggest that he had the option of trying to prosecute the three officers through the civilian courts.

== Developments ==
In the Dáil Éireann one year later, the Labour Party leader Tom Johnson quoted different details from the newspaper Éire, which stated that Mulcahy had been directed to arrest "some" of the "four" officers and that a court-martial met, but as witnesses had been dispersed quickly around, the country the case had collapsed. He asked for a statement about the dispersion of witnesses and about what had been done for the abused women and asked why the Executive Council had refused to publish the results of the army investigation.

Cosgrave replied that the advice of the Attorney-General to the Executive Council had been acted upon and that it would not be published.

The Kenmare incident was a precursor to the Army Mutiny of 1924, which was the culmination of tension caused by a number of events and ideological divisions between civilian and military influences in authority, including the diminishing involvement of the IRB, of which Mulcahy and O'Daly were leading members, in a civilian-controlled army. Amongst many other resignations, sackings and demobilisations as part of the downsizing of the army, O'Daly resigned his post in 1924. The papers on the Kenmare attack were released in the 1980s. He returned to the Army as a captain in construction in 1940.
