= Irish Free State offensive =

Military campaign during the Irish Civil War

- Part of the Irish Civil War
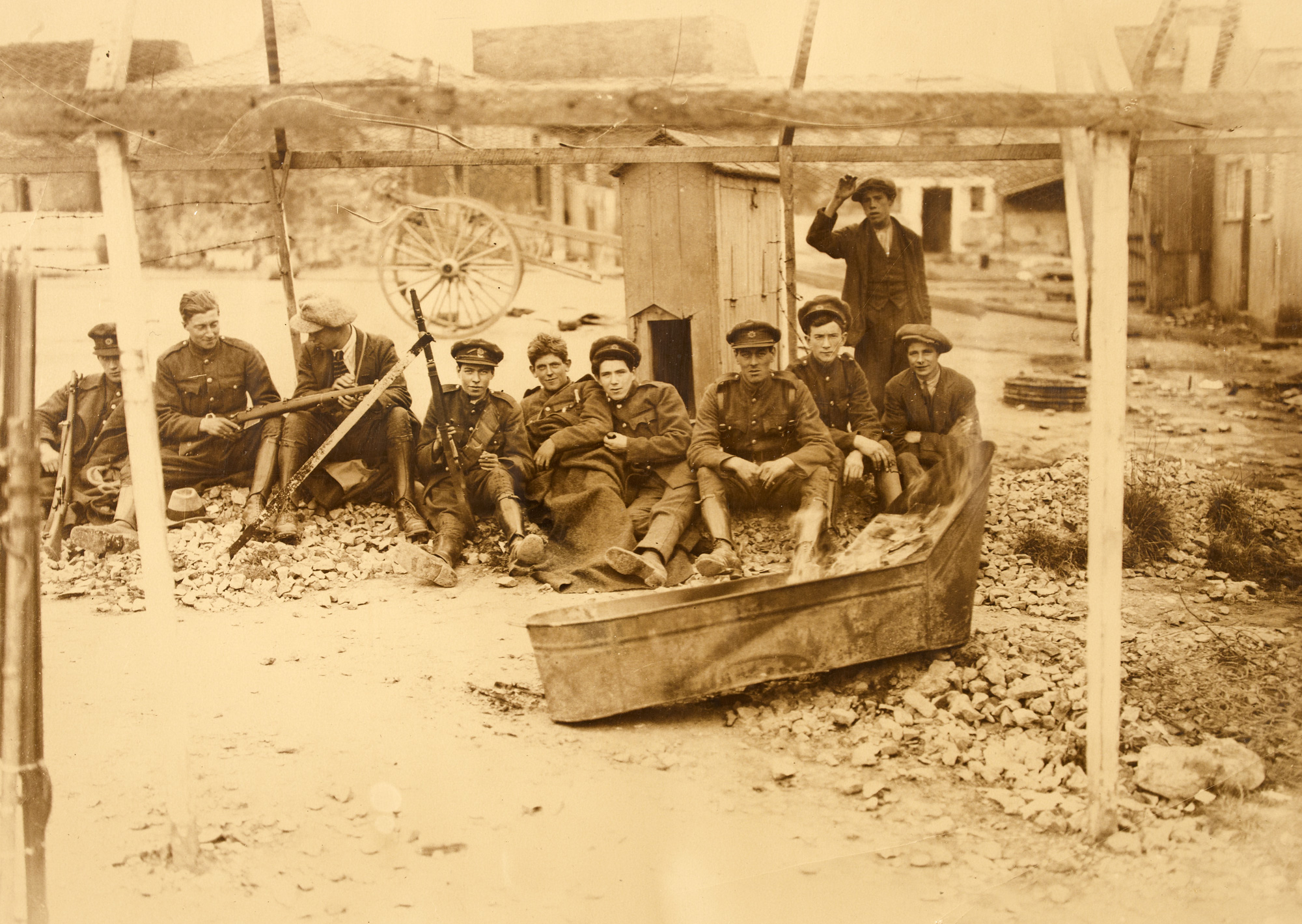
- National Army troops in Limerick, July 1922
Date	28 June – late August, 1922
Location	Munster, Ireland
Result	Free State victory

Belligerents
Anti-treaty IRA	Irish Free State

Commanders and leaders
Liam Lynch	Michael Collins †; Eoin O'Duffy; Richard Mulcahy

Strength
~15,000	14,000

Casualties and losses
300 killed and wounded 6,000 taken prisoner	185 killed 674 wounded

The Irish Free State offensive of July–September 1922 was the decisive military stroke of the Irish Civil War. It was carried out by the National Army of the newly created Irish Free State against anti-treaty strongholds in the south and southwest of Ireland.

At the beginning of the Civil War in June 1922, the Irish Free State government, composed of the leadership faction who had accepted the Anglo-Irish Treaty, held the capital city of Dublin, where its armed forces were concentrated and some other areas of the midlands and north. The new National Army was composed of those units of the Irish Republican Army loyal to them, plus recent recruits, but was, at the start of the war, still relatively small and poorly armed.

Much of the rest of the country, particularly the south and west, was outside of its control and in the hands of the anti-Treaty elements of the IRA, who did not accept the legitimacy of the new state and who asserted that the Irish Republic, created in 1919, was the continuing legitimate all-island state. This situation was rapidly brought to an end in July and August 1922, when the commander-in-chief of the Free State forces, Michael Collins, launched the offensive.

The offensive re-took the major towns for the Free State Government and marked the end of the conventional phase of the conflict. The offensive was followed by a 10-month period of guerrilla warfare until the republican side was defeated.

== Munster Republic ==
The civil war started in Dublin, with a week of street fighting from 28 June to 5 July 1922 in which the Free State's forces secured the Irish capital from anti-Treaty IRA troops who had occupied several public buildings. With Dublin in pro-treaty hands, the conflict spread throughout the country, with anti-Treaty forces holding Cork, Limerick and Waterford as part of the self-styled "Munster Republic". They also held most of the west of Ireland. The Free State, on the other hand, after its taking of Dublin, controlled only of the eastern part of its territory.

However, the Anti-Treaty side were not equipped to wage conventional war, lacking artillery and armoured units, both of which the Free State obtained from the British. This meant that Liam Lynch, the Chief of Staff of the Anti-Treaty IRA, hoped to act purely on the defensive, holding the "Munster Republic" long enough to prevent the foundation of the Free State and forcing the re-negotiation of the Treaty. Lynch's strategy was bitterly criticised by other anti-Treaty officers, such as Ernie O'Malley and Tom Barry. O'Malley felt that the republicans, who initially outnumbered the Government forces by roughly 12,000 fighters to 8,000 (and who had the bulk of the experienced fighters from the preceding Irish War of Independence), should have seized the initiative, taken the major cities and presented the British with a resurrected Irish Republic as a fait accompli.

The thinking behind O'Malley's analysis was that time was on the side of the Free State as they could only get stronger, through supplies from the British, revenue raised from taxation and recruitment into their army, while the Republican side had only very limited means of re-supply of men, money or arms. O'Malley wrote: "Tan War experience would no longer suffice as this type of fighting would need semi-open warfare. Columns would have to be larger and their men trained to take the offensive in driving the enemy out of towns and cities... Unless our Connacht and Munster men moved on to Leinster effective opposition would be broken up piecemeal and we would soon be crushed".

The leaders of the Free State government, Michael Collins and Richard Mulcahy, also felt that a rapid victory was essential from their point of view. To secure the withdrawal of British troops from Ireland (Collins' ultimate aim) the government would have to demonstrate its viability by suppressing what, from its point of view, was an illegal insurrection and its control all of its sovereign territory. It was with this aim in mind that they launched their offensive in July–August 1922 to re-take the south and west of the country.

== Fall of Limerick ==
In Limerick, the outbreak of the war saw the city already occupied by both pro and anti-treaty factions. The anti-treaty IRA, largely composed of Liam Forde's Mid-Limerick Brigade and commanded by Liam Lynch, held four military barracks and most of the town. The Free State forces in the city consisted of the pro-Treaty First Western Division of the IRA under Michael Brennan and the Fourth Southern Division under Commandant General Donochadh O'Hannigan. They held the Customs House, the Jail, the Courthouse, Williams Street RIC Barracks, and Cruises Hotel. They also held the Athlunkard bridge located outside of Limerick which provided a secure means of bringing reinforcements.

Fighting broke out between them on 11 July 1922, when the first Free State reinforcements arrived from Dublin. At 7 p.m. on 11 July, the National Army opened fire on the Republican garrison holding the Ordnance Barracks. Liam Lynch left Limerick when the fighting broke out and transferred his headquarters to Clonmel.

On 17 July, General Eoin O'Duffy arrived with 150 Free State reinforcements including a Whippet Rolls-Royce armoured car, 2 Lancia armoured cars, 4 trucks with 400 rifles, 10 Lewis machine guns, 400 grenades, ammunition and an 18-pounder cannon. The 18-pounder field gun was used on 19 July to batter the Strand Barracks, which was under the command of captain Connie McNamara, into surrender.

After three days of street fighting, after midnight on 21 July, the Republicans set the Artillery (also called the ordnance barracks), castle barracks and New Barracks on fire and evacuated Limerick city. Despite the intensive street fighting in Limerick, the casualties of the combatants were relatively light; 19 bodies were left in the city morgue, twelve of whom were civilians and seven Free State soldiers. Another 87 were wounded. The Republican dead were reported in the press as thirty killed but they admitted only five. Limerick Prison, designed to hold 120 people, contained 800 prisoners by November. Following the fall of Limerick the anti treaty forces retreated through Patrickswell towards Kilmallock. There, in the Kilmallock-Bruff-Bruree triangle, would be seen some of the heaviest fighting of the war.

== Free State troops take Waterford ==
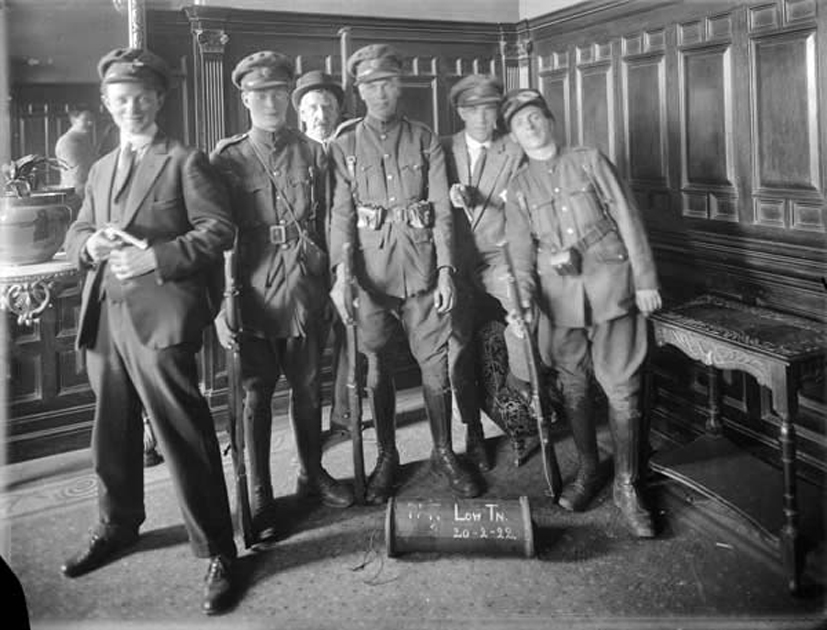
Soldiers at Granville Hotel, Waterford during July 1922

Republicans considered Waterford to be the eastern strongpoint of the Munster Republic; however, it too was taken by a Free State column equipped with armour and artillery between 18 July and 20 July. The city was held by the IRA Waterford Brigade, and a unit from Cork city under the overall commandant of Colonel Commandant Pax Whelan and flying column leader George Lennon; a total of nearly 300 men.

In late July 1922, National Army troops under Major General John T. Prout and former East Waterford I.R. A. Commandant Paddy Paul, composed of 450 men, one 18-pounder artillery piece and 4 machine guns arrived from Kilkenny to retake the city. The republicans had chosen to defend the city along the southern bank of the river Suir, occupying the military barracks, the prison and the Post Office. Prout placed his artillery on Mount Misery hill overlooking their positions and bombarded the Republicans until they were forced to evacuate the barracks and prison.

However, the gun had to be brought down to Ferrybank (along the river) to fire over open sights before the Republicans abandoned the Post Office. Six more shells were fired at Ballybricken prison before it was also evacuated. Some street fighting followed before the Republicans abandoned the city and retreated westwards. Two Free State soldiers were killed in the fighting and one Republican. Five civilians were also killed.

A proposed Republican counterattack from Carrick on Suir failed to materialise.

The Free State forces under Prout went on to take Tipperary on 2 August, Carrick on Suir on 3 August and Clonmel on 10 August, effectively clearing the south midlands of Republican held positions. In taking these towns, Free State troops generally encountered only limited resistance. The Republicans, when faced with artillery, tended to retreat and burn barracks they were holding rather than try to hold them and risk heavy casualties.

At both Limerick and Waterford, the Free State's advantage in weaponry, particularly artillery, was decisive. Casualties on both sides in these actions were relatively light, although there were also some civilian casualties, since the fighting took place in the heavily populated urban centres.

== Combat at Killmallock ==
The Free State troops under Eoin O'Duffy encountered more tenacious resistance in the countryside around Kilmallock, south of Limerick city, when they tried to advance into republican held Munster. Eoin O'Duffy's 1,500 troops were faced with about 2,000 anti-Treaty IRA men under Liam Deasy, who had three armoured cars they had taken from the evacuating British troops. Deasy's men were dug in at Kilmallock, Bruree to the northwest and Bruff to the northeast.

On 23 July Major General W.R.E. Murphy (a former British Army officer and O'Duffy's second in command) took the town of Bruff, but his poorly motivated troops lost it again the following day and 76 of them surrendered to the Republicans. The Free State troops re-took Bruff shortly afterwards, though and on 30 July, they assaulted Bruree with their best troops – the Dublin Guard. They took it after a five-hour fight, but only after artillery was brought up at close range to support them. Liam Deasy attempted to re-take the village on 2 August, but the attack, with three armoured cars, was beaten off.

The following day, 2,000 Free State troops advanced on Kilmallock. Fighting continued here until 5 August, despite the arrival of over 1,000 more Free State troops and more armoured cars and artillery. Deasy's anti-treaty forces were ultimately forced to retreat however, when Free State forces were landed by sea behind them in Passage West and Fenit in counties Cork and Kerry on 2 August and 8 August respectively.

When the National Army entered Kilmallock on 5 August, they found only a Republican rearguard, the remainder having already retreated in the direction of Charleville. There was final rearguard action at Newcastlewest before the republican forces retreated after losing a number of men (press reports suggested 12) killed.

== Fall of Cork and landing in the west ==
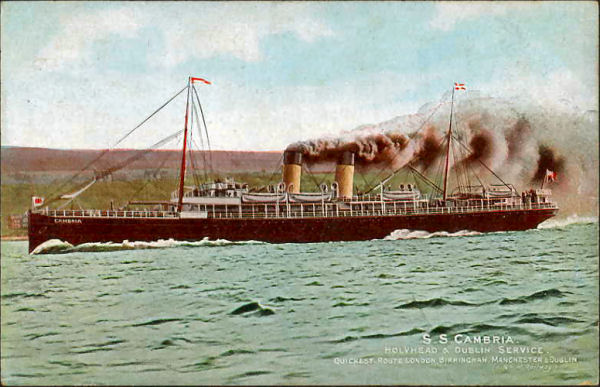
Arvonia, formerly Cambria

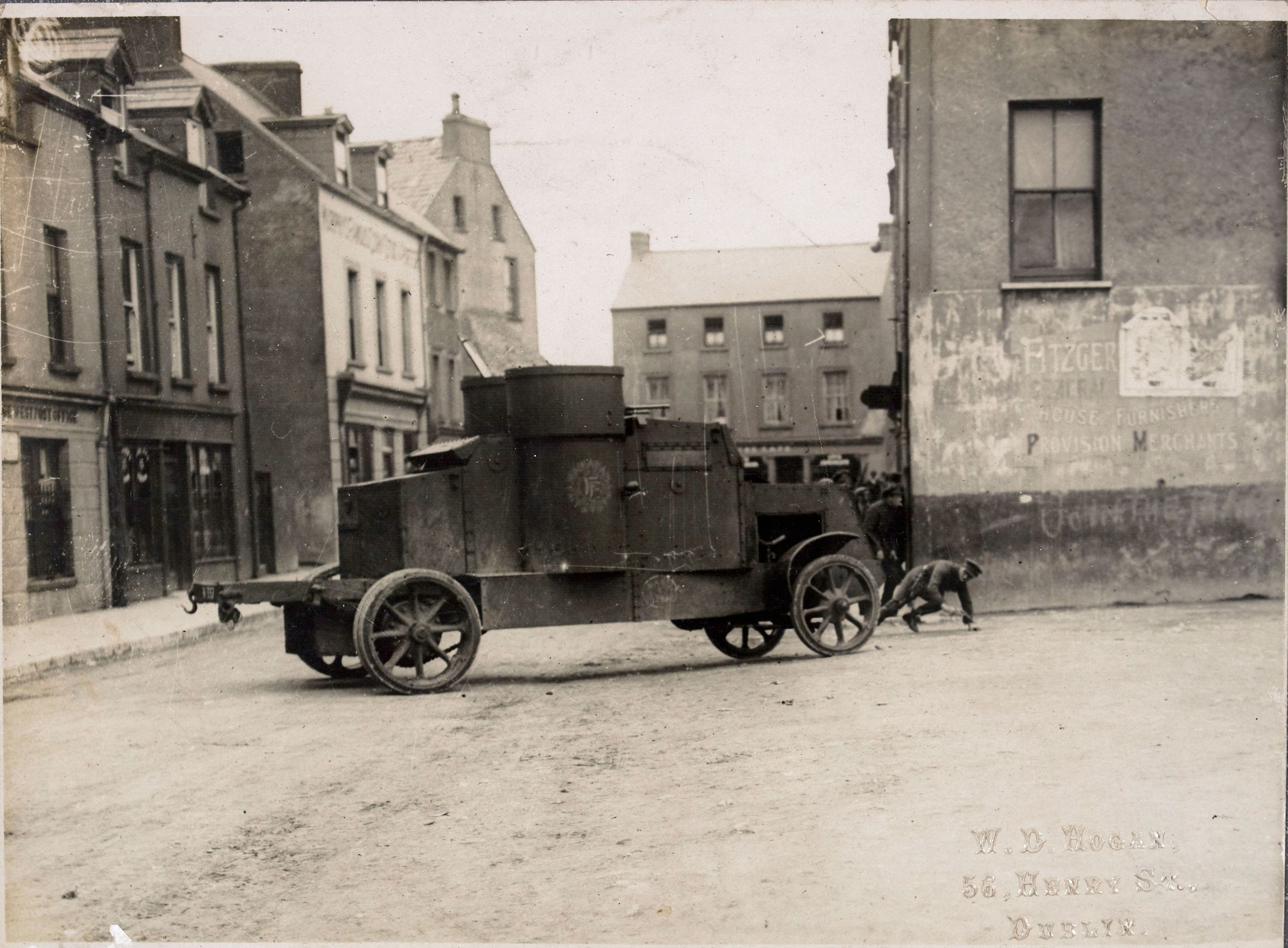
Free State armoured car at Passage West, c.August 1922

The Free State's forces took the south and west of Ireland with landings from the sea. Seaborne landings were the first proposed by Emmet Dalton and then adopted by Michael Collins. Their plan was to avoid the hard fighting that would inevitably occur if they advanced overland through Republican held Munster and Connaught. To this end, they commandeered several civilian passenger ships to transport troops. They were the Arvonia and the SS Lady Wicklow They were escorted by British naval vessels

The first naval landing took place at Clew Bay in County Mayo on 24 July and helped re-take the west of Ireland for the Free State. This force, consisting of 400 Free State soldiers, one field gun and an armoured car under Christopher O'Malley, re-took the Republican held town of Westport and linked up with another Free State column under Seán Mac Eoin advancing from Castlebar. A Free State column also dispersed anti-Treaty IRA forces in County Donegal in Ireland's north-west.

The largest seaborne landings took place in the south. Ships disembarked about 2,000 well equipped Free State troops into the heart of the "Munster Republic" and caused the rapid collapse of the Republican position in this province.

Paddy Daly and the Dublin Guard landed at Fenit in County Kerry on 2 August and fought their way into Tralee at the cost of 9 killed and 35 wounded. They were reinforced on 3 August, by around 250 pro-treaty IRA men from County Clare, embarked from Kilrush to Tarbert in fishing boats. The Free State forces rapidly occupied the towns in the county but the Republican units in Kerry survived more or less intact and would fight a determined guerrilla campaign for the remainder of the war.

If the Munster Republic had a capital, it was Cork and the largest seaborne landings of the civil war were aimed at taking that city. Emmet Dalton led 800 troops, with two artillery pieces and armoured cars, who landed at Passage West, near the city, on 8 August. A further 200 men were put ashore at Youghal and 180 troops landed at Glandore. There was some heavy fighting at Rochestown and Douglas in which at least ten Free State and 7 Republican fighters were killed and at least 60 men on both sides were wounded, before the outnumbered and outgunned anti-treaty IRA retreated into the city. However, they did not try to continue the fighting within Cork itself, partly in order to spare the civilian population, but instead burned Charles Barracks, near Kinsale, which they had been occupying, and dispersed into the countryside.

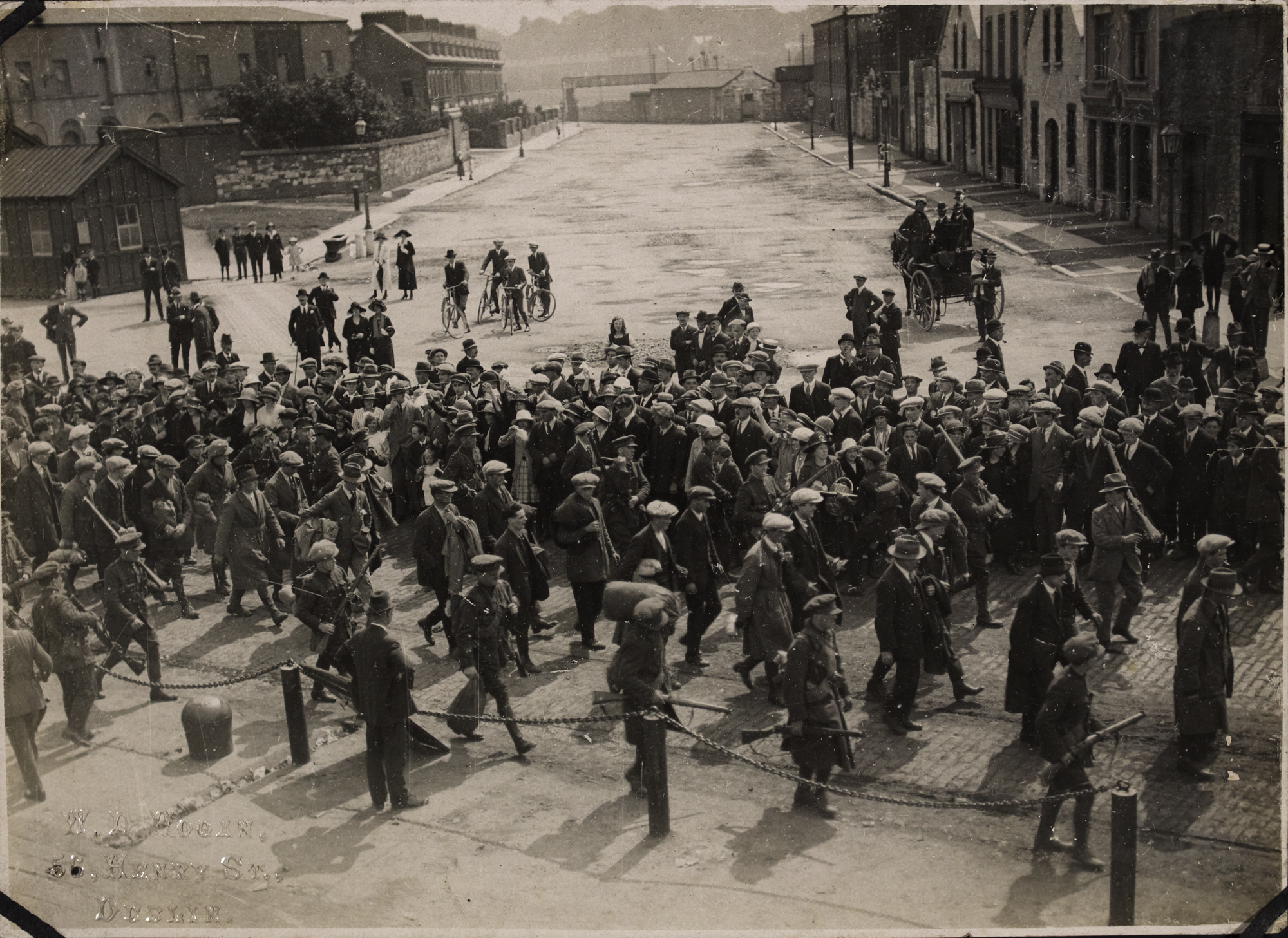
Republican prisoners are marched towards Cork Gaol in August 1922

The Free State landings in Munster coincided with an attempt by anti-Treaty guerrillas to isolate Dublin by destroying all the road and rail bridges leading into the city. However this operation was a complete failure with over 180 republicans being captured at a cost of only two Free State soldiers wounded.

On 10 August, Free State troops entered Cork city unopposed, the last city to fall in the "Munster Republic". Liam Lynch, the Republican commander in chief abandoned Fermoy, the last Republican held town, the following day. In leaving Fermoy, he issued an order to troops under his command to stop trying to hold fixed positions and to form flying columns to pursue guerrilla warfare.

== Aftermath ==
The Free State offensive of July–August 1922 all but ended the Anti-Treaty side's chances of winning the war. The Republicans failed, with the exception of a brief stand around Killmallock, to resist the advance of Free State troops anywhere in the country. While some of this can be put down to the Free State's advantages in arms and equipment, the Republican leadership under Liam Lynch also failed to devise any coherent military strategy, allowing their positions to be picked off one by one. On top of this, most of the Republican fighters showed little appetite for the civil war, generally retreating before National Army attacks rather than putting up determined resistance. In part, this shows a lack of discipline and training for conventional warfare, but there was also a general reluctance on both sides to fight against former comrades from the War of Independence. One Tom Maguire said that, 'in the beginning our men would not kill the [Free] Staters', while another, George Gilmore, said, 'I had not a desire to kill the enemy, all of our man had it [reluctance] to some extent and the officers who were operating against us were our own former friends'.

The Free State Government's victories in the major towns inaugurated a period of inconclusive guerrilla warfare. Anti-Treaty IRA units held out in areas such as the western part of counties Cork and Kerry in the south, county Wexford in the east and counties Sligo and Mayo in the west. Sporadic fighting also took place around Dundalk, where Frank Aiken and the Fourth Northern Division of the Irish Republican Army were based. Aiken originally wanted to stay neutral, but was arrested by Free State troops along with 400 of his men on 16 July 1922. They subsequently broke out of prison in Dundalk and temporarily re-took the town in a guerrilla raid.

Nowhere, however, did the Republicans manage to re-take any territory lost on the first two months of fighting. Moreover, with the exception of county Kerry and a few other localities, the anti-treaty guerrilla campaign failed to gather momentum and by 1923, was largely reduced to small scale attacks and acts of sabotage.

It took eight months of intermittent guerrilla warfare after the fall of Cork before the war was brought to an end, with victory for the Free State government. In April 1923, Liam Lynch was killed. His successor as anti-Treaty commander, Frank Aiken, called a ceasefire on 30 April and a month later, ordered his men to "dump arms" and go home.

The intervening period was marked by the death of leaders formerly allied in the cause of Irish independence. Commander-in-Chief Michael Collins was killed in an ambush by anti-treaty republicans at Béal na mBláth, near his home in County Cork, on 22 August 1922. Arthur Griffith, the Free State president died of a brain haemorrhage ten days before. The Free State government was subsequently led by William Cosgrave and the Free State Army by General Richard Mulcahy. On the Republican side, leaders such as Rory O'Connor, Liam Mellows, Joe McKelvey, Erskine Childers and Liam Lynch lost their lives in the guerrilla phase of the war.

This phase of the war, much more than the conventional phase, developed into a vicious cycle of revenge killings and reprisals as the Republicans assassinated pro-treaty politicians and the Free State responded with the execution of Republican prisoners.

== See also ==
- Battle of Dublin
- Timeline of the Irish Civil War
