= Executions during the Irish Civil War =

War crimes committed during the guerilla phase of the Irish Civil War (1922-23)

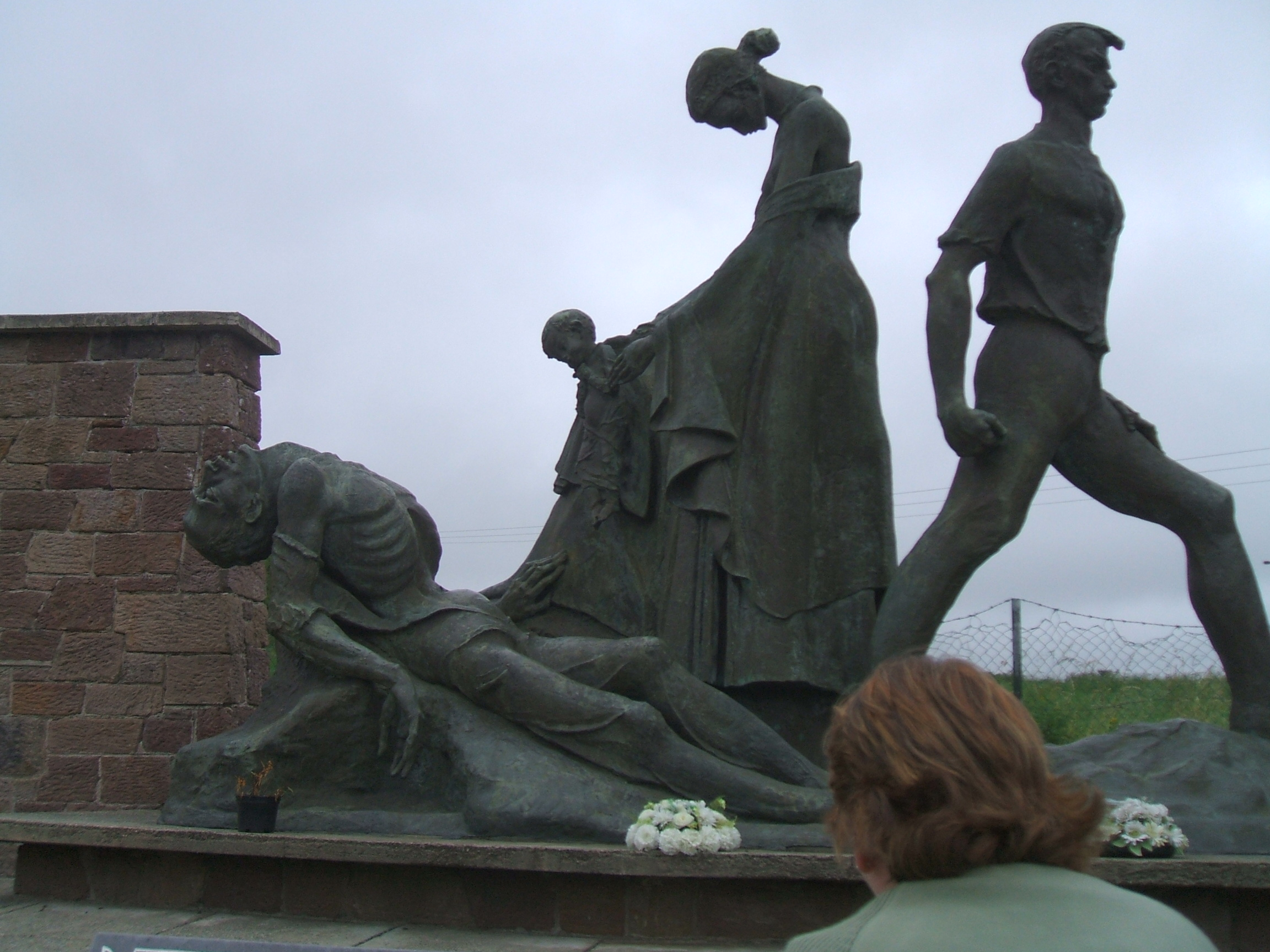
Memorial to the Republican insurgents executed by Free State forces at Ballyseedy, County Kerry, designed by Yann Goulet

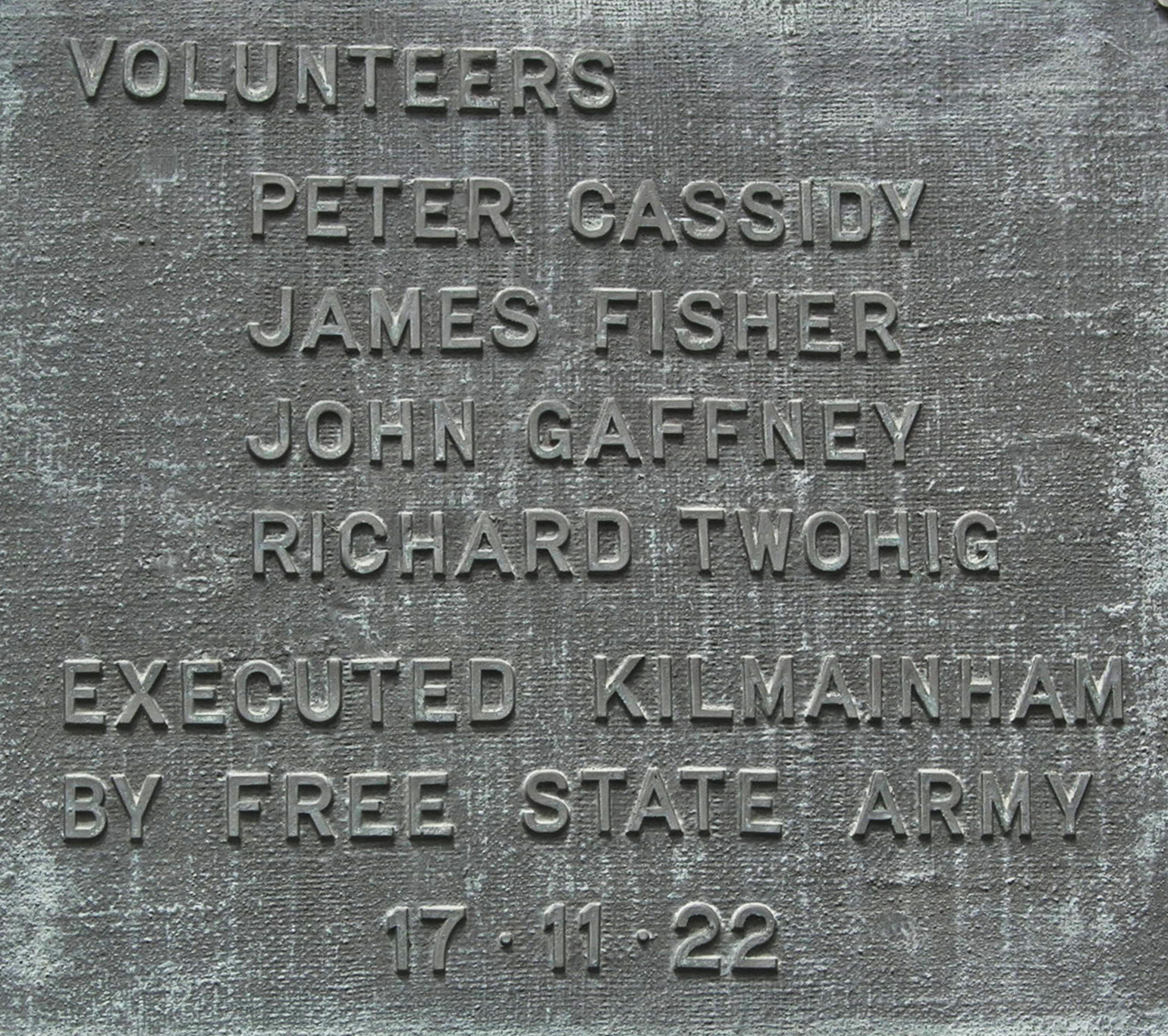
Plaque in Kilmainham Jail for the four Anti-Treaty IRA executed on 17 November 1922

The executions during the Irish Civil War took place during the guerrilla phase of the Irish Civil War (June 1922 – May 1923). This phase of the war was bitter, and both sides, the government forces of the pro-treaty Irish Free State and the anti-Treaty Irish Republican Army (IRA) insurgents, used executions and terror in what developed into a cycle of atrocities. From November 1922, the pro-treaty provisional later Free State government embarked on a policy of executing Republican prisoners in order to bring the war to an end. Many of those killed had previously been allies, and in some cases close friends (during the Irish War of Independence 1919–1921), of those who ordered their deaths in the civil war. In addition, government troops also summarily executed at least 130 prisoners in the field. The executions of prisoners left a lasting legacy of bitterness in Irish politics.

The use of execution by the Irish Free State in the Civil War was relatively harsh compared to the recent British record. In contrast with 81 official executions by the Irish Free State government, the British had executed 24 IRA volunteers during the 1919–21 conflict.

== Background ==
Michael Collins, commander of the pro-treaty National Army, had hoped for a speedy reconciliation of the warring Irish nationalist factions, demanding that anti-treaty Republicans must accept the people's verdict and then could go home without their arms stating that "We want to avoid any possible unnecessary destruction and loss of life. We do not want to mitigate their weakness by resolute action beyond what is required". With reconciliation in mind, Collins had opposed the introduction of an execution policy.

However, following the death of Collins in an ambush on 22 August 1922, the provisional government, under the leadership of W. T. Cosgrave, took the position that the Anti-Treaty IRA were conducting an unlawful rebellion against the legitimate Irish government established in law and prisoners should be treated as criminals rather than as combatants. O'Higgins in particular voiced the opinion that the use of drastic action was the only way to bring the war to an end.

Another factor contributing to the executions policy was the escalating level of violence. In the first two months of the Civil War (July–August 1922), pro-treaty forces had successfully taken all the territory held by Republicans and the war seemed all but over. After the Anti-Treaty side moved to guerrilla tactics in August–September, the pro-treaty National Army casualties mounted and they even lost control over some of the territory taken in the Irish Free State offensive. The town of Kenmare, for example, was re-taken by Anti-Treaty fighters on 9 September and held by them until 6 December.

== Legal basis for the executions ==
On 27 September 1922, three months after the outbreak of war, the pro-treaty Provisional Government put before the Dáil the Army (Emergency Powers) Resolution. This had the effect of endorsing martial law introduced by Collins on 11 July 1922, but not proclaimed at that time. Commonly, but incorrectly, referred to as the "Public Safety Bill", the Army Resolution gave parliament's formal recognition to the army's military courts and tribunals. The Army Resolution was not law, it had no legal effect, and should not be referred to as 'legislation' or 'statutory martial law'. The Army Resolution formally recognised parliament's support for measures the army was already taking and had been taking since Collins' death in August, notably the execution of prisoners under martial law powers Collins had adopted but not fully used. For this reason the "Public Safety Act", also sometimes known as the "Emergency Powers Act", is not recorded in the Irish Statute book. Introduced into the historiography after 1969, both "statutes" are alone invention of Irish historians. At least two Irish historians in their recently published histories of the civil war have devoted a chapter each to discussing the fictitious "Public Safety Act" which is widely referenced in the academic literature. No execution had any legal standing, rather the executions were justified by "military necessity" (otherwise "martial law"), in the pursuit of restoring the public order. Free State minister, Ernest Blythe, explained the non-legal status of the Army Resolution and all executions addressing the Dáil debate following the reprisal executions of four IRA leaders on 8 December 1922.

"Deputy O’Connell spoke about the difference between executions following trial by Military Courts and the [reprisal] executions this morning. From the point of view of legality, I think there is no difference. The Military Courts were not legalised by the Resolution of the Dáil. They for their operations depend upon military necessity, and the executions carried out under the sentence of those Courts are justifiable only because of military necessity. The executions carried out this morning can only be justified on grounds of military necessity. There was a formality in the case of the trials following the Military Courts. The proceedings at those Military Courts were in the nature of precautionary investigations, but the form did not give any legality to the executions that they would not have had without the form of a trial. The justification for the putting to death of the men who were put to death following trial by Military Courts was that the situation justified it, and that for the purpose of restoring the rule of law in this country it was necessary that this thing should be done".

The Army Resolution recognised the army could impose penal servitude of any duration, as well as the death penalty, for any offence including 'aiding or abetting attacks' on state forces, possession of arms and ammunition or explosive 'without the proper authority' and 'looting, destruction of public or private property or arson'. By imposing capital punishment on anyone found in possession of either firearms or ammunition, without a lawful reason, the army could punish Republican sympathisers for storing any arms or ammunition that could be used by Republican forces.

A motion was put to the Dáil by the Minister for Defence General Richard Mulcahy on 26 September to amend the army's Emergency Powers Order; it stated:

"(IV.) The breach of any general order or regulation made by the Army authorities; and the infliction by such Military Courts or Committees of the punishment of death, or of imprisonment for any period, or of a fine of any amount either with or without imprisonment, on any person found guilty by any such Court or Committee of any of the offences aforesaid;"

This motion was amended and approved by resolution of the Dáil, after considerable debate. The Republican, or Anti-Treaty, members had refused to take their seats in the Parliament and the opposition to the measures was provided by the Labour Party, who likened the legislation to a military dictatorship. On 3 October, the Free State had offered an amnesty to any Anti-Treaty fighters who surrendered their arms and recognised the government. However, there was little response. W. T. Cosgrave, the head of the Provisional Government, told the Dáil in response, "Although I have always objected to the death penalty, there is no other way that I know of in which ordered conditions can be restored in this country, or any security obtained for our troops, or to give our troops any confidence in us as a government".

The final version, passed on 18 October 1922, stated:

"(4) The breach of any general order or regulation made by the Army Council and the infliction by such Military Courts or Committees of the punishment of death or of penal servitude for any period or of imprisonment for any period or of a fine of any amount either with or without imprisonment on any person found guilty by such Court or Committee of any of the offences aforesaid. Provided that no such sentence of death be executed except under the countersignature of two members of the Army Council".

The Order was strengthened in January 1923 to allow execution for many other categories of offence, including non-combatant Republican supporters carrying messages, assisting in escapes or using army or police uniforms; and also desertion from the National Army.

The Free State government passed the Indemnity Act in August 1923. The Indemnity Act barred from prosecution actions ‘done for the purpose…of the suppression of the state of rebellion’. The later Indemnity Act was the reason for parliament passing the Army Resolution in September 1922, because the Resolution identified the Provisional Government 'has placed on the Army the responsibility for the establishment of the authority of the Government in all parts of the country...' The Army Resolution identified the pro-treaty army was fighting to defend the Provisional Government and the third Dáil both established under British law with royal assent. Some in the pro-treaty army believed, and were encouraged to believe by Collins, that they were fighting the civil war toward achieving a new IRB republic under the direction of the IRB Supreme Council. The Army Resolution clearly identified the army was fighting for parliament's sovereignty and therefore could be later indemnified by that parliament for its actions during the civil war. Two Public Safety Acts were passed in 1923.

=== Other social pressures ===
Soon after the passage of the Army Resolution, several other pressures were brought to bear on Republican fighters.

On 10 October, the Catholic Hierarchy issued a pastoral letter condemning the Anti-Treaty IRA Volunteers, ending with: "All who in contravention of this teaching, participate in such crimes are guilty of grievous sins and may not be absolved in Confession nor admitted to the Holy Communion if they persist in such evil courses." In effect this meant that the Anti-Treaty fighters would be excommunicated, and if killed could not expect a church burial or to pass on to heaven. In a population that was overwhelmingly Catholic and very devout, this was an extremely powerful social pressure applied at an opportune time for the Provisional Government.

On 15 October, directives were sent to the press by Free State director of communications, Piaras Béaslaí to the effect that Free State troops were to be referred to as the "National Army", the "Irish Army", or just "troops". The Anti-Treaty side were to be called "Irregulars" and were not to be referred to as "Republicans", "IRA", "forces", or "troops", nor were the ranks of their officers allowed to be given.

From now on, the Free State, armed with updated military courts, the support of the Roman Catholic church and of much of the Press, was prepared to treat the IRA fighters as criminals rather than as combatants.

== The first executions and reprisal executions ==
The first four executions occurred a month after most Republicans had rejected the amnesty that expired in mid-October 1922. On 17 November, four Anti-Treaty IRA volunteers were shot in Dublin. These were followed by three more on 19 November.

The next to be executed was Erskine Childers, who had been secretary to the Anglo-Irish Treaty plenipotentiaries. Childers was a well-known Republican - it was on his boat, the Asgard, that the guns had been brought in during the Howth gun-running - he was a renowned columnist, novelist, and a member of the Anglo-Irish, Protestant landowning family of Glendalough House, Annamoe, County Wicklow. He had been captured on 10 November in possession of a Spanish-made .32-calibre pocket pistol which Collins had given to him, or as Charles Gavan Duffy described the circumstances to the Dáil four days after Childers was shot, "The military authorities apparently ascertained that Erskine Childers was living at the home of his childhood in Wicklow; they surrounded the house in the early morning; they found him there and arrested him, as I understand, getting out of bed with a revolver." Childers and eight others appealed to the civilian judiciary. Judge O'Connor, the Master of the Rolls in Ireland, considered whether a state of war existed. He considered the existence of a Provisional Government in Ireland and its authority to act as proposed and execute the nine.

'The Provisional Government now is, de jure as well as de facto, the ruling authority in Ireland and its duty is to preserve the peace, administer the law, and to repress, by force if necessary, all attempts to overthrow it.'

On 24 November Childers was executed by firing squad. Childers was the Republican head of propaganda and it was widely speculated that seven low-ranking Republicans were shot before Childers so that it would not look as if he had been singled out to be executed.

In response to the executions, on 30 November, Liam Lynch, Chief of Staff of the Anti-Treaty IRA, ordered that any member of Parliament (TD) or senator who had signed or voted for the "murder bill" ( i.e. Army Resolution) should be shot on sight. He also ordered the killing of hostile judges and newspaper editors. On the same day, three more Republican prisoners were executed in Dublin.

On 7 December, Anti-Treaty IRA gunmen shot two TDs, Seán Hales and Pádraic Ó Máille, in Dublin as they were on their way to the Dáil. Hales was killed and Ó Máille was badly wounded. After an emergency cabinet meeting, the Free State government decided to endorse measures the Army Council had decided to take. The government did not direct the Army Council. Accordingly, on 8 December 1922, the day after Hales' killing, four members of the IRA Army Executive, who had been in jail since the first week of the war – Rory O'Connor, Liam Mellows, Richard Barrett (a close friend of Seán Hales) and Joe McKelvey – were executed in a reprisal. O'Connor and Mellows particularly were revered heroes of the War of Independence. These were unlawful executions (see Blythe above), carried out under martial law. It was also one of the most important Roman Catholic feasts in the calendar, the Feast of the Immaculate Conception. All over the country, leaflets were later distributed with a poem by Pádraig de Brún "Rory and Liam and Dick and Joe / (Star of the Morning, Mary, come!) / Red is their hearts' blood, their souls like snow / (Mary Immaculate, guide them home!) / Their eyes are steady in face of death…" Later on 8 December the Dáil debated the executions and voted 39–14 in support of the action. One of the poignant aspects of the incident was that O'Connor and Kevin O'Higgins were formerly close friends, and O'Connor had been best man at O'Higgins' wedding just a few months previously. Historian Michael Hopkinson reports that Richard Mulcahy had pressed for the executions and that Kevin O'Higgins was the last member of cabinet to give his consent. Recently, the executions have been as "unconstitutional" by the Fine Gael party, the political successors of the 1922 Free State government. All executions during the civil war were "unconstitutional" because they were carried out under non-statutory martial law.

Republicans burned the homes of elected representatives in reprisal for executions of their men. On 10 December, the house of TD Seán McGarry was burned down, killing his seven-year-old son whom the attackers had not realised was inside. Homes of senators were among the 199 houses burned or destroyed by the IRA in the war. In February 1923, Kevin O'Higgins' elderly father was killed by Republicans at the family home in Stradbally, having attempted to snatch a gun from the leader of the group evicting him and his family. The house of the President of the Executive Council W. T. Cosgrave was burned. His uncle was killed during an armed raid on his shop, which does not appear to have been political.

== Official executions ==
In all, the pro-treaty Army Council formally sanctioned the execution of 81 Anti-Treaty prisoners during the war. Republican historian Dorothy Macardle popularised the number of 77 executions in Republican consciousness, but she appears to have left out those executed for activities such as armed robbery. Most of those summarily executed were tried by court-martial in a military court and had to be found guilty merely of bearing arms against the State.

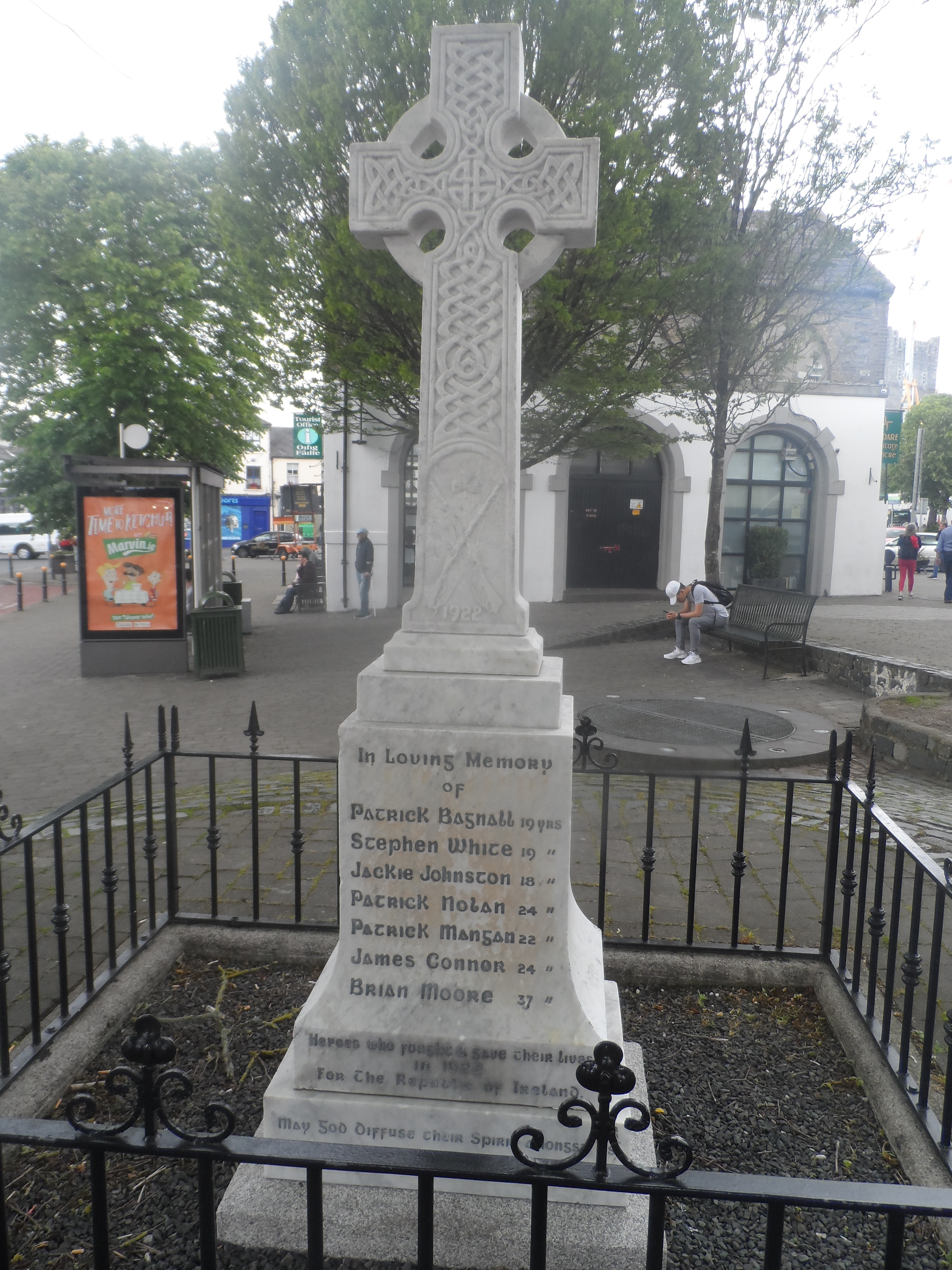
Memorial in Kildare to the seven men executed at the Curragh Camp in 1922.

On 30 November 1922, there were further executions at Beggars Bush Barracks. Among them was John (Jack) Leo Murphy of 56 Belview Buildings, Dublin, he was a member of "A" Coy, 3rd Batt, Sth Dublin Brigade, IRA. He was 19 years of age.

After the initial round of executions, the firing squads got under way again in earnest in late December 1922. On 19 December, seven IRA men from Kildare were shot in the Curragh Camp, County Kildare and ten days later, two more were shot in Kilkenny. Most of those executed were prisoners held in Kilmainham and Mountjoy Gaols in Dublin, but from January 1923, Kevin O'Higgins argued that executions should be carried out in every county in order to maximise their impact. Accordingly, in that month, 34 prisoners were shot in such places as Dundalk, Roscrea, Carlow, Birr and Portlaoise, Limerick, Tralee, Roscrea and Athlone. From 8–18 February, the Free State suspended executions and offered another amnesty in the hope that Anti-Treaty fighters would surrender. However, the war dragged on for another two months and witnessed at least 20 more official executions, amongst them six men executed on 11 April in Tuam Military Barracks found guilty of the unlawful possession of arms on 21 February. There is a commemorative plaque in Tuam on the site of the old Military Barracks.

Several Republican leaders narrowly avoided execution. Ernie O'Malley, captured on 4 November 1922, was not executed because he was too badly wounded when taken prisoner to face a court martial and possibly because the Free State was hesitant about executing an undisputed hero of the recent struggle against the British. Liam Deasy, captured in January 1923, avoided execution by signing a surrender document calling on the Anti-Treaty forces to lay down their arms. The majority of those executed were ordinary rank and file IRA volunteers and this appears to have been Army Council policy.

The Anti-Treaty IRA Executive called a ceasefire on 30 April 1923, ordering volunteers to "dump arms", ending the war, on 24 May. Nevertheless, executions of Republican prisoners continued for a time. Four IRA men were executed in May after the ceasefire order and the final two executions took place on 20 November, months after the end of hostilities. It was not until November 1924 that a general amnesty was offered to the anti-treaty IRA for any acts committed in the civil war.

== Unofficial killings ==
In addition to the official executions, pro-treaty troops conducted many unofficial killings of captured anti-Treaty volunteers. From an early point in the war, from late August 1922 (coinciding with Collins' death), there were many incidents of pro-treaty troops killing prisoners. Some of these killings appear to have been in revenge for Collins death.

In Dublin, a number of people were killed by the new Intelligence service, the Criminal Investigation Department (CID), which was headed by Joseph McGrath and was based in Oriel House in Dublin city centre. This department was separate from the Civic Guard, later the Garda Síochána, the ordinary unarmed Irish police force and Army Military Intelligence. Although many CID men were senior army officers closely associated with Collins. By 9 September, a British intelligence report stated that "Oriel House" had already killed "a number of Republicans" in Dublin. Joseph Bergin, a Military Policeman from the Curragh Camp who was believed to have been passing information to Republican prisoners was murdered by Army Special Branch (GHQ Military Intelligence) in December 1923. Captain Murray was convicted of Bergin's murder in 1925 and sentenced to death, later commuted to life in prison. Murray was also a suspect in the Noel Lemass murder investigation in late 1923. In a number of cases, Anti-Treaty IRA men and boys were abducted by pro-treaty forces, killed and their bodies dumped in public places. Republican sources detail at least 25 such cases in the Dublin area. There were also allegations of abuse of prisoners during interrogation by the CID. For example, Republican Tom Derrig had an eye shot out while in custody.

County Kerry, where the guerrilla campaign was most intense, would see many of the most vicious episodes in the Civil War. On 27 August 1922, in the first such incident of its type, two anti-treaty fighters were shot after they had surrendered in Tralee. One of them, James Healy, was left for dead but survived to tell of the incident. Republicans also killed prisoners. After their successful attack on Kenmare on 9 September, the Anti-Treaty IRA shot National Army officer Tom "Scarteen" O'Connor in their home on Main Street. There was a steady stream of similar incidents after this point in Kerry, culminating in a series of high-profile atrocities in the "murder month" of March 1923.

Also in September, a party of nine Anti-Treaty fighters was wiped out near Sligo by Free State troops. Four of them, (including Brian MacNeill, the son of Eoin MacNeill) were later found to have been shot at close range in the forehead, indicating that they had been shot after surrendering.

=== Ballyseedy massacre and its aftermath ===
March 1923 saw a series of notorious incidents in Kerry, where 23 Republican prisoners were killed in the field (and another five summarily executed) in just four weeks.

Five Free State soldiers were killed by a booby trap bomb, and another seriously injured, while searching a Republican dugout at the village of Knocknagoshel, County Kerry, on 6 March 1923. Three of those killed were natives of the county, and the two others were members of the Dublin Guard. This constituted the largest loss of life in a single event for the Free State forces since the Battle of Dublin at the start of the civil war in June 1922. The next day, the local Free State commander in Kerry authorised the use of Republican prisoners to "clear mined roads". Irish Free State Army General Officer Commanding (G.O.C) of the Kerry Division, Major General Paddy Daly justified the measure as "the only alternative left to us to prevent the wholesale slaughter of our men".

That night, 6/7 March, nine Republican prisoners who had previously been tortured, with bones broken with hammers, were taken from Ballymullen Barracks in Tralee to Ballyseedy crossroads and tied to a land mine which was detonated, after which the survivors were machine-gunned. One of the prisoners, Stephen Fuller, was blown to safety by the blast of the explosion. He was taken in at the nearby home of Michael and Hannah Curran. They cared for him and although he was badly injured, he survived - Fuller later became a Fianna Fáil TD. The Free State troops in nearby Tralee had prepared nine coffins, unaware of Fuller's escape, and the Dublin Guard released nine names to the press, the fabrication hastily changed when they realised their mistake. There was a riot when the bodies were brought back to Tralee, where the enraged relatives of the killed prisoners broke open the coffins in an effort to identify their dead.

This was followed by a series of similar incidents with mines within 24 hours of the Ballyseedy killings. Five Republican prisoners were blown up with another landmine at Countess Bridge near Killarney and four in the same manner at Bahaghs near Cahersiveen. Another Republican prisoner, Seamus Taylor, was taken to Ballyseedy Woods by National Army troops and shot dead.

On 28 March, five IRA men, captured in an attack on Cahersiveen on 5 March, were officially executed in Tralee. Another, captured the same day, was summarily shot and killed. Thirty-two anti-Treaty fighters died in Kerry in March 1923, of whom only five were killed in combat. Free State officer Lieutenant Niall Harrington has suggested that reprisal killings of Republican prisoners continued in Kerry up to the end of the war. Harrington had a successful and respected career in the Irish military, retiring as a Lt Colonel in January 1959, after seven years as deputy director of G2 (Intelligence) Branch, GHQ, the forerunner to the Directorate of Military Intelligence of the Irish Defence Forces.

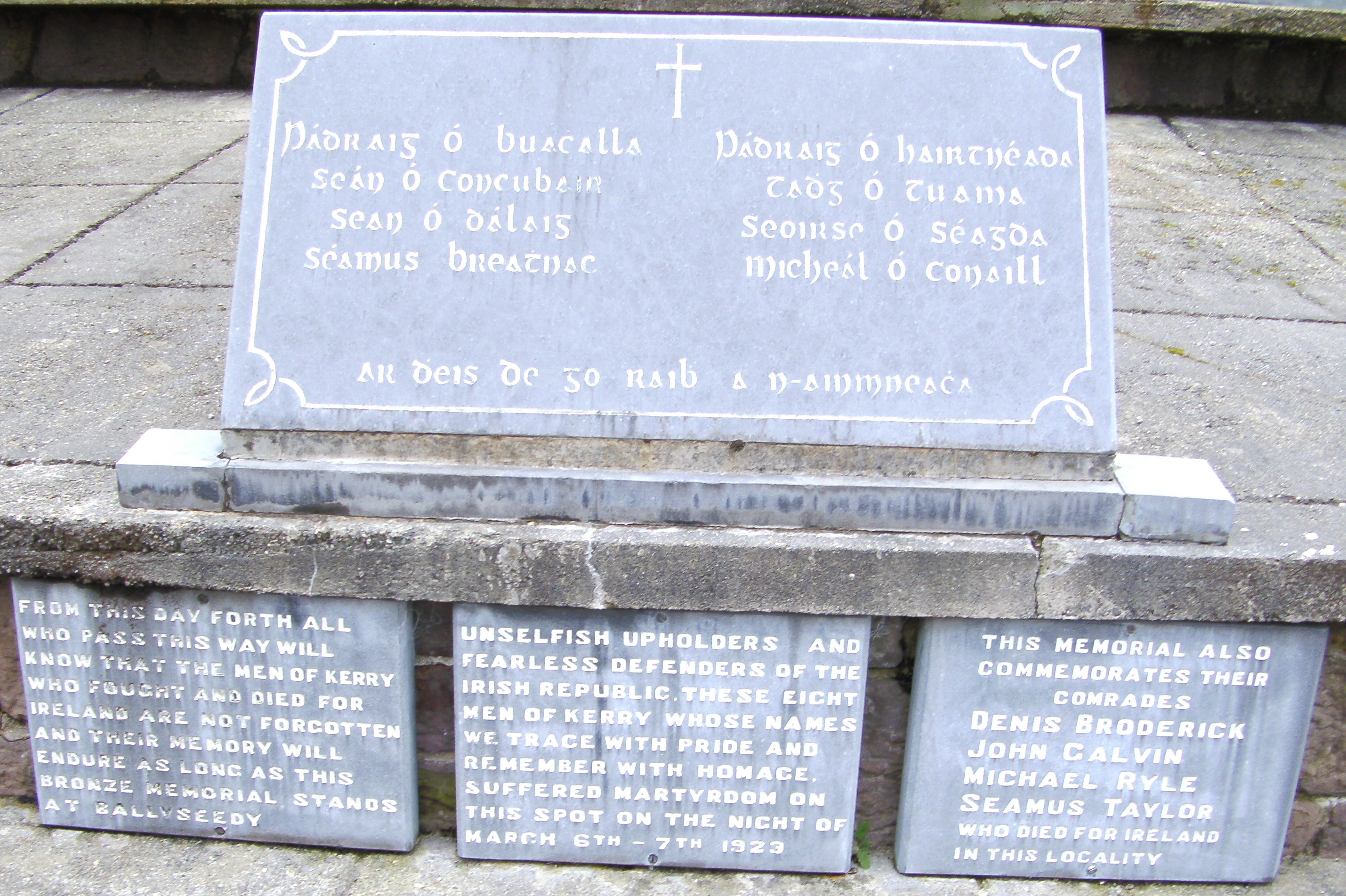
Memorial to the Irish Republican soldiers executed by Free State forces at Ballyseedy, County Kerry.

The National Army's Dublin Guard and in particular their commander, Major-General Paddy Daly, were widely held to be responsible for these killings. They claimed that the prisoners had been killed while clearing roads of landmines laid by Republicans. When questioned in the Dáil by Labour Party leader Thomas Johnson, Richard Mulcahy, the National Army's commander-in-chief, supported Daly's story. A military Court of Inquiry conducted in April 1923 - chaired by the chief suspect Daly himself - cleared the Free State troops of the charge of killing their prisoners. Harrington related his concerns to Kevin O'Higgins, a family friend. O'Higgins spoke to Mulcahy in turn who didn't act on the information. Johnson asked O'Higgins in the Dáil about a possible inquest and the latter said it was not impossible, intimating it might not be desirable.

It has since emerged that the prisoners were beaten, tied to explosives, and then killed. Before leaving Ballymullen barracks in Tralee, Free State officers took some of the nine Republican prisoners into a room and showed them the coffins which had been prepared for them, according to author, historian and researcher Owen O’Shea, in a podcast by the Irish Times published to mark the 100th anniversary of the massacre on 6 March 2023. The prisoners were tied in a circle around the mine before it was detonated. Such was the force of the blast, that many of the bodies of the victims were dismembered. Dorothy Macardle in her 1924 book Tragedies of Kerry, cited both eyewitness accounts and local newspaper reports of the horrific scene of the massacre after it took place. Witnesses claimed that for weeks after the massacre birds could be seen feeding on lumps of human flesh in trees around the site.

Owen O'Shea stated that, such was the cruelty and sadistic "lust for revenge" that Paddy Daly had, that after the massacre, the remains of those killed were badly treated by Free State forces. No care was taken to ensure that remains from different victims were not placed together in the same coffin, or indeed to ensure families received the correct remains. When the families of the dead came to the main gates of Ballymullen Barracks on 8 March to collects the remains of their relatives, Daly ordered the unit of the Free State army band based at the barracks, to be stationed at the gate and to play "upbeat jazz music" as a way of taunting the families.

==== Cahersiveen Killings ====
Republican prisoners were also being held at the old Irish Poor Law Union workhouse, in the townland of Bahaghs near Cahersiveen, in south County Kerry. On Monday 12 March 1923, the five Republican prisoners were taken from the workhouse by members of the 'visiting committee' and killed with a mine in the same manner at those at Ballyseedy and Countess Bridge the previous week. These prisoners were reportedly shot in the legs before being blown up to prevent their escape. Lt Harrington and fellow Free-State Lieutenant W McCarthy (who resigned over the incidents) later stated that not only were the explosives detonated by the Free State troops, they had also been made by Free State troops at Ballymullen in Tralee and laid there for this purpose. Lt McCarthy stated: "There was no attempt at escape, as the prisoners were shot first and then put over a mine and blown up. It was a Free State mine, made by themselves."

Documents released by the Irish Department of Justice, Equality and Law Reform through the National Archives in 2008 show that the Free State Cabinet was aware that the Army's version of events was untrue. An investigation concluded that the prisoners had been killed by a party of National Army soldiers from Dublin known as the 'visiting committee' and that those at Cahersiveen had been beaten and shot before being blown up.

The records show that the victims of the killings in Bahaghs were Michael Courtney jnr, Eugene Dwyer, Daniel Shea, John Sugrue and William Riordan. All from the Waterville area and were members of a unit in the Kerry No 3 Brigade of the IRA. Maurice Riordan, the father of William Riordan (who was only 18 at the time of his killing) applied to the Compensation (Personal Injuries) Committee - set up to adjudicate on claims arising from the War of Independence and its aftermath - for compensation for this son's death. Several of the families of the other men killed also applied. As a result, the Garda Síochána (then called the Civic Guard) undertook an investigation into the Bahaghs killings and concluded the evidence supported the conclusion the men with unlawfully shot and deliberately killed with a mine, and that the National Army version of event was a cover up. The records show that on 10 December 1923 the deputy commissioner of the Garda Síochána, Eamonn Coogan (father of the journalist and historian Tim Pat Coogan), included a letter with the Garda report on the Cahersiveen killings to the Secretary of the Department of Justice (then called the Ministry of Justice). In this letter, deputy Commissioner Coogan states that he has been-

"directed by the commissioner [Eoin O'Duffy] to inform you that the facts stated are true and are as follow:" [...] William Riordan was an "irregular and one of a column captured with arms". He was temporarily imprisoned at the workhouse, Cahirciveen, he was taken from there and "done to death" with four other prisoners. The body known as the Visiting Committee under Comdt Delaney arrived at Cahirciveen "to carry out an inspection", with Lieut P Kavanagh as second in command. "In the small hours of the morning of March 12th, Kavanagh took five prisoners (of whom Riordan was one) from the guard at the workhouse, remarking 'Would you like to come for a drive?' "The guard, believing the prisoners were being transferred to Tralee, handed them over. It transpired that the five prisoners were subsequently shot and their bodies blown up by a mine at Bahaghs, Cahirsiveen. Evidence of these facts can be procured. "The applicant in the claim, who is the father of William Riordan, is in needy circumstances."

==== Killings in Wexford and Donegal ====
Two other episodes of revenge killing took place elsewhere in the country in the same month. On 13 March, three Republican fighters were judicially executed in Wexford in the southeast. In revenge, three National Army soldiers were captured and killed.

On 14 March at Drumboe Castle in County Donegal in the northwest of Ireland, four Anti-Treaty IRA fighters, Charlie Daly (26), Sean Larkin (26), Daniel Enright (23), and Timothy O'Sullivan (23), who had been captured and held in the castle since January, were summarily shot in retaliation for the death of a National Army soldier in an ambush.

==== Free State response ====
Despite support from the Department of Justice for payment of compensation to the family of William Riordan who was killed at Cahersiveen, in April 1924 the Free State Cabinet under WT Cosgrave rejected the claim, and those made by the families of other Republican prisoners executed. This, in effect, put an end to any further official investigations of the killings.

What exactly prompted this outbreak of vindictive killings in County Kerry in March 1923 is unclear, but the events that followed in the county would prove to be the most bloody, sadistic and vengeful of the entire civil war. A total of 68 Free State soldiers had been killed and 157 wounded in Kerry up to March 1923. A total of 85 would die in Kerry before the war was over in May 1923. Why the deaths at Knocknagoshel prompted such a savage response remains an open question.

But historian Owen O'Shea stated that the "visceral hatred and almost psychopathic approach" of some Free State commanders, such as the Commander of Free State forces in Kerry, Major General Paddy Daly, played a role in creating a permissive environment where such acts of cruelty and extrajudicial murder could occur with impunity. This attitude was compounded by the protection offered by senior Army command and the Free State government, up to and including the Minister of Defence and Army Chief of Staff, General Richard Mulcahy, who publicly claimed that Free State forces under his command would never be capable of committing such atrocities.

A month after the massacre at Ballyseedy, a Free State Army Court of Inquiry was held at Tralee on 7 April 1923. It was presided over by Major-General Paddy Daly, and included Major-General Eamon Price, G.H.Q., Portobello Barracks, Dublin and Colonel J. McGuinness, Kerry Command, "for the purpose of inquiring into the circumstances of the death of eight prisoners at Ballyseedy Bridge, near Tralee, on the morning of the 8th March 1923." Unsurprisingly, the inquiry cleared all of the Free State officers and men of any wrongdoing and laid the blamed for the deaths on the actions of Anti-Treaty Republicans laying the mine. General Mulcahy even went so far as to read the findings of the inquiry, now discredited as a whitewash, into the record of Dáil Eireann. Giving his evidence to the Inquiry captain James Clark, Kerry Command, named colonel David Neligan as the officer who selected the prisoners who were killed. At the time of the massacre, Neligan was the Director of Intelligence at Kerry Command.

=== End of the war ===
According to historian Tom Mahon, the Irish Civil War, "effectively ended," on 10 April 1923, when the Free State Army mortally wounded IRA Chief of Staff Liam Lynch during a skirmish in County Tipperary. Twenty days later, Lynch's successor, Frank Aiken, gave the order to "dump arms".

Even after the war was over, National Army troops killed anti-Treaty fighters. For example, Noel Lemass, a captain in the anti-Treaty IRA, was abducted in Dublin and summarily executed in July 1923, two months after the war had ended. His body was dumped, probably first in the River Liffey at Manor Kilbride, then moved to Killakee in the Dublin Mountains, near Glencree, where it was found in October 1923. The spot where his body was found is marked by a memorial erected by his brother Seán Lemass - a future Taoiseach of Ireland. There are no conclusive figures for the number of unofficial executions of captured Anti-Treaty fighters, but Republican officer Todd Andrews put the figure for "unauthorised killings" at 153.

In August 1923 W.T Cosgrave stated that all such unlawful killings would be investigated: "There was one matter I wished to refer to—first, the case of Mr. Noel Lemass, and secondly, the case of Mr. McEntee, who apparently was murdered during the last few days. I have to say that we condemn those acts unhesitatingly, and we wish to exhort all sections of the State to remember that there are means provided for dealing with any such cases, and it will be the duty of the Ministry to make every effort to bring to justice persons who contravene the law; that in securing life and property here we have to secure it for no one section more than another; and that the life and property of those who differ politically from us, or who may take extreme measures, will be dealt with according to law, and only according to law. Those acts have got no sanction, direct or indirect, or in any way, from us, and we will do our duty to every citizen regardless of what section he belongs to."

As well as the killings, up to 5,000 republican prisoners and internees started a hunger strike in September–November 1923, resulting in 7 deaths.

== Effects ==
It has been argued that the Free State Government's policy of executions helped to end the Civil War. After the executions in reprisal for the killing of Seán Hales, there were no further attempts to assassinate members of parliament. On the other hand, there had been no previous attempts to assassinate TDs either, and the burning of senators' and TDs' homes continued after the executions. Another continuing argument is whether Anti-Treaty leaders believed that continuing the war would mean exposing their prisoners to further executions. This may have been a factor in Frank Aiken calling a halt to the Anti-Treaty campaign in April 1923.

There is no doubt that the executions and assassinations of the Civil War left a poisonous legacy of bitterness. The Free State's official executions of 77-81 Anti-Treaty prisoners during the Civil War was recalled by members of Fianna Fáil (the political party that emerged from the anti-Treaty side in 1926) with bitterness for a decade afterwards. In the Irish republican tradition, those IRA members executed in the Civil War became martyrs and were venerated in songs and poems. (For example, the ballad "Take It Down From The Mast", written in 1923 by James Ryan and later popularised by Dominic Behan).

As a result of the executions in the Civil War, many Republicans would never accept the Free State as a legitimate Irish government, but rather saw it as a repressive, British-imposed government. This attitude was partially alleviated after 1932, when Fianna Fáil, the party that represented the bulk of the Republican constituency, entered government peacefully. Ironically, in 1939 De Valera himself enacted the Offences against the State Act and the Emergency Powers Act 1939, under which a further 5 Republicans were executed by hanging.

Kevin O'Higgins, the man Republicans saw as most directly responsible for the enactment of the Public Safety Act, with its sanction of executions, himself fell victim to assassination by the IRA in 1927 - becoming one of the last victims of Civil War era violence in Ireland. Richard Mulcahy became a leader of Fine Gael in 1948, but never became Taoiseach because of his role in the Civil War.

== In fiction ==
Author Ulick O'Connor wrote a play in 1985 titled Execution about the 1922 executions of Rory O'Connor, Liam Mellows, Joe McKelvey and Dick Barrett.

The 2006 film The Wind That Shakes the Barley climaxes with an IRA guerrilla being executed by a firing squad commanded by his own brother, who supports the Free State. This was inspired by the case of Seán and Tom Hales who were both leaders, but on opposing sides of the war.

The Republican: An Irish Civil War Story by T.S. O'Rourke follows the Irish Civil War from a Republican perspective in Dublin and includes details of the reprisal executions carried out by the Free State.

== List of official executions ==
Executions sanctioned by the Provisional Government, later the Free State Executive Council, during the Civil War.
Date	Name	Age	Location	County	Notes
17 November 1922	James Fisher	18	Kilmainham Gaol	Dublin	All members of the IRA's Dublin Brigade from The Liberties, all four were executed for possession of revolvers.
17 November 1922	Peter Cassidy	21	Kilmainham Gaol	Dublin	All members of the IRA's Dublin Brigade from The Liberties, all four were executed for possession of revolvers.
17 November 1922	Richard Twohig	19	Kilmainham Gaol	Dublin	All members of the IRA's Dublin Brigade from The Liberties, all four were executed for possession of revolvers.
17 November 1922	John Gaffney	19	Kilmainham Gaol	Dublin	All members of the IRA's Dublin Brigade from The Liberties, all four were executed for possession of revolvers.
24 November 1922	Erskine Childers	52	Beggars Bush Barracks	Dublin	For possession of a revolver
30 November 1922	Joseph Spooner		Beggars Bush Barracks	Dublin	Arrested in Erne Street on 30 October 1922 by National Army troops after an attempt to blow up Oriel House, HQ of Free State Intelligence.
30 November 1922	Patrick Farrelly		Beggars Bush Barracks	Dublin	Arrested in Erne Street on 30 October 1922 by National Army troops after an attempt to blow up Oriel House, HQ of Free State Intelligence.
30 November 1922	John Murphy	19	Beggars Bush Barracks	Dublin	Arrested in Erne Street on 30 October 1922 by National Army troops after an attempt to blow up Oriel House, HQ of Free State Intelligence.
8 December 1922	Rory O'Connor	39	Mountjoy Gaol	Dublin	Execution of four high-ranking IRA members as reprisal for the shooting of Seán Hales. All four men were executed outside the terms of the law (no trial or courts martial).
8 December 1922	Liam Mellows	30	Mountjoy Gaol	Dublin	Execution of four high-ranking IRA members as reprisal for the shooting of Seán Hales. All four men were executed outside the terms of the law (no trial or courts martial).
8 December 1922	Joe McKelvey	24	Mountjoy Gaol	Dublin	Execution of four high-ranking IRA members as reprisal for the shooting of Seán Hales. All four men were executed outside the terms of the law (no trial or courts martial).
8 December 1922	Richard Barrett	32	Mountjoy Gaol	Dublin	Execution of four high-ranking IRA members as reprisal for the shooting of Seán Hales. All four men were executed outside the terms of the law (no trial or courts martial).
19 December 1922	Stephen White	19	Curragh Camp	Kildare	Seven of eight IRA men arrested at Mooresbridge on 13 December 1922 in possession of ten rifles, ammunition and explosives. (The eighth, Tom Behan, was killed during their arrest.)
19 December 1922	Joseph Johnston	20	Curragh Camp	Kildare	Seven of eight IRA men arrested at Mooresbridge on 13 December 1922 in possession of ten rifles, ammunition and explosives. (The eighth, Tom Behan, was killed during their arrest.)
19 December 1922	Patrick Mangan	22	Curragh Camp	Kildare	Seven of eight IRA men arrested at Mooresbridge on 13 December 1922 in possession of ten rifles, ammunition and explosives. (The eighth, Tom Behan, was killed during their arrest.)
19 December 1922	Patrick Nolan	20	Curragh Camp	Kildare	Seven of eight IRA men arrested at Mooresbridge on 13 December 1922 in possession of ten rifles, ammunition and explosives. (The eighth, Tom Behan, was killed during their arrest.)
19 December 1922	Brian Moore	28	Curragh Camp	Kildare	Seven of eight IRA men arrested at Mooresbridge on 13 December 1922 in possession of ten rifles, ammunition and explosives. (The eighth, Tom Behan, was killed during their arrest.)
19 December 1922	James O'Connor	19	Curragh Camp	Kildare	Seven of eight IRA men arrested at Mooresbridge on 13 December 1922 in possession of ten rifles, ammunition and explosives. (The eighth, Tom Behan, was killed during their arrest.)
19 December 1922	Patrick Bagnel	19	Curragh Camp	Kildare	Seven of eight IRA men arrested at Mooresbridge on 13 December 1922 in possession of ten rifles, ammunition and explosives. (The eighth, Tom Behan, was killed during their arrest.)
29 December 1922	John Phelan		Kilkenny Military Barracks	Kilkenny	Phelan and Murphy had carried out a raid on Sheastown House, a big house near Kilkenny, and seized goods worth £189 to finance the Anti-Treaty effort. They were arrested on 13 December 1922 at Bennetsbridge.
29 December 1922	John Murphy		Kilkenny Military Barracks	Kilkenny	Phelan and Murphy had carried out a raid on Sheastown House, a big house near Kilkenny, and seized goods worth £189 to finance the Anti-Treaty effort. They were arrested on 13 December 1922 at Bennetsbridge.
8 January 1923	Leo Dowling	21	Portobello Barracks	Dublin	National Army soldier; tried by court martial for aiding the IRA.
8 January 1923	Sylvester Heaney	19	Portobello Barracks	Dublin	National Army soldier; tried by court martial for aiding the IRA.
8 January 1923	Laurence Sheehy	20	Portobello Barracks	Dublin	National Army soldier; tried by court martial for aiding the IRA.
8 January 1923	Anthony O'Reilly	22	Portobello Barracks	Dublin	National Army soldier; tried by court martial for aiding the IRA.
8 January 1923	Terence Brady	20	Portobello Barracks	Dublin	National Army soldier; tried by court martial for aiding the IRA.
13 January 1923	Thomas McKeown		Dundalk Gaol	Louth	Two men from County Armagh, arrested at Hackballscross for possession of revolvers and ammunition on 9 January 1923.
13 January 1923	John McNulty		Dundalk Gaol	Louth	Two men from County Armagh, arrested at Hackballscross for possession of revolvers and ammunition on 9 January 1923.
13 January 1923	Thomas Murray		Dundalk Gaol	Louth	Arrested at Piedmont, Lordship, Dundalk and charged with having a revolver and 100 rounds of ammunition; his family claimed that he only had non-working guns and six rounds.
15 January 1923	Fred Burke	28	Roscrea Castle Barracks	Tipperary	Arrested at Borrisoleigh on 23 December 1923 for possession of revolvers; all were locals, except for McNamara who was from Killaloe. Their remains were not given to their families until 1924.
15 January 1923	Patrick Russell	26	Roscrea Castle Barracks	Tipperary	Arrested at Borrisoleigh on 23 December 1923 for possession of revolvers; all were locals, except for McNamara who was from Killaloe. Their remains were not given to their families until 1924.
15 January 1923	Martin O'Shea	22	Roscrea Castle Barracks	Tipperary	Arrested at Borrisoleigh on 23 December 1923 for possession of revolvers; all were locals, except for McNamara who was from Killaloe. Their remains were not given to their families until 1924.
15 January 1923	Patrick McNamara	22	Roscrea Castle Barracks	Tipperary	Arrested at Borrisoleigh on 23 December 1923 for possession of revolvers; all were locals, except for McNamara who was from Killaloe. Their remains were not given to their families until 1924.
15 January 1923	James Lillis	22	Carlow Barracks	Carlow	A native of Carlow town; Lillis was suspected of involvement in the Graney Ambush (24 October 1922), which killed two National Army members. Lillis was later found in possession of a rifle and ammunition in Borris, County Carlow.
20 January 1923	James Daly	23	Tralee Barracks	Kerry	All convicted of being in possession of arms and ammunition.
20 January 1923	John Clifford	22	Tralee Barracks	Kerry	All convicted of being in possession of arms and ammunition.
20 January 1923	Michael Brosnan	28	Tralee Barracks	Kerry	All convicted of being in possession of arms and ammunition.
20 January 1923	James Hanlon	25	Tralee Barracks	Kerry	All convicted of being in possession of arms and ammunition.
20 January 1923	Cornelius (Con) McMahon	28	Limerick Prison	Limerick	Convicted on dubious evidence of damaging the railway station at Ard Solus.
20 January 1923	Patrick Hennessey	29	Limerick Prison	Limerick	Convicted on dubious evidence of damaging the railway station at Ard Solus.
20 January 1923	Thomas Hughes		Custume Barracks	Westmeath	Executed for possession of arms and ammunition.
20 January 1923	Michael Walsh		Custume Barracks	Westmeath	Executed for possession of arms and ammunition.
20 January 1923	Herbert Collins		Custume Barracks	Westmeath	Executed for possession of arms and ammunition.
20 January 1923	Stephen Joyce		Custume Barracks	Westmeath	Executed for possession of arms and ammunition.
20 January 1923	Martin Bourke		Custume Barracks	Westmeath	Executed for possession of arms and ammunition.
22 January 1923	James Melia	20	Dundalk Military Barracks	Louth	Possessing arms and ammunition without the proper authority at Dowdallshill on 7 January 1923.
22 January 1923	Thomas Lennon	19	Dundalk Military Barracks	Louth	Possessing arms and ammunition without the proper authority at Dowdallshill on 7 January 1923.
22 January 1923	Joseph Ferguson	27	Dundalk Military Barracks	Louth	Possessing arms and ammunition without the proper authority at Dowdallshill on 7 January 1923.
25 January 1923	Michael Fitzgerald		Waterford Infantry Barracks	Waterford	Members of the Cork No. 1 Brigade, they had socialised in a ‘safe house’ in Clashmore on 3 December 1923. Allegedly betrayed by an informer, they were captured by Free State soldiers at a nearby river the following morning. Their bodies were refused entry to a Catholic church, in line with a canon law ruling that their deaths were tantamount to suicide.
25 January 1923	Patrick O'Reilly		Waterford Infantry Barracks	Waterford	Members of the Cork No. 1 Brigade, they had socialised in a ‘safe house’ in Clashmore on 3 December 1923. Allegedly betrayed by an informer, they were captured by Free State soldiers at a nearby river the following morning. Their bodies were refused entry to a Catholic church, in line with a canon law ruling that their deaths were tantamount to suicide.
26 January 1923	Patrick Cunningham	22	Birr Castle	Offaly	The three had actually been expelled from their IRA active service unit for some minor misdemeanours. They committed some armed robberies for financial gain and were executed for those crimes.
26 January 1923	William Conway	20	Birr Castle	Offaly	The three had actually been expelled from their IRA active service unit for some minor misdemeanours. They committed some armed robberies for financial gain and were executed for those crimes.
26 January 1923	Colum Kelly	18	Birr Castle	Offaly	The three had actually been expelled from their IRA active service unit for some minor misdemeanours. They committed some armed robberies for financial gain and were executed for those crimes.
27 January 1923	Patrick Geraghty	27	Maryborough (Portlaoise) Barracks	Laois	Convicted of being in possession of arms without proper authority at Croghan on 10 November 1922.
27 January 1923	Joseph Byrne	24	Maryborough (Portlaoise) Barracks	Laois	Convicted of being in possession of arms without proper authority at Croghan on 10 November 1922.
26 February 1923	Thomas Gibson	23	Maryborough (Portlaoise) Barracks	Laois	National Army soldier; tried by court martial for aiding the IRA.
13 March 1923	James O'Rourke		Beggars Bush Barracks	Dublin	Convicted of taking part in an attack on Free State Forces at Jury's Hotel, Dublin and being in possession of a revolver on 21 February 1923.
13 March 1923	William Healy		Cork County Gaol	Cork	Convicted of attempting to burn the house of Mrs Powell, a sister of Michael Collins, conspiracy to murder Commandant P. D. Scott of the National Army, conspiring to damage and destroy property by fire, and aiding and abetting an attack on National forces.
13 March 1923	James Parle	24	Wexford Gaol	Wexford	Parle had served in the War of Independence and was in Bob Lambert's flying column in the Civil War. Creane had also been a pre-Truce Volunteer.
13 March 1923	Patrick Hogan	22	Wexford Gaol	Wexford	Parle had served in the War of Independence and was in Bob Lambert's flying column in the Civil War. Creane had also been a pre-Truce Volunteer.
13 March 1923	John Creane	18	Wexford Gaol	Wexford	Parle had served in the War of Independence and was in Bob Lambert's flying column in the Civil War. Creane had also been a pre-Truce Volunteer.
13 March 1923	Luke Burke (Note: Also known as Henry Keenan.)	20	Mullingar Barracks	Westmeath	Civilian tried by military court and executed by the National Army.
13 March 1923	Michael Grealy (Note: Surname also recorded as Greery.)		Mullingar Barracks	Westmeath	Civilian tried by military court and executed by the National Army.
14 March 1923	John (Seán) Larkin	26	Drumboe Castle	Donegal	Known as the "Drumboe Martyrs," found guilty of possession of weapons and ammunition, they were shot in reprisal for the killing of a Free State officer, Captain Bernard Cannon.
14 March 1923	Timothy O'Sullivan	24	Drumboe Castle	Donegal	Known as the "Drumboe Martyrs," found guilty of possession of weapons and ammunition, they were shot in reprisal for the killing of a Free State officer, Captain Bernard Cannon.
14 March 1923	Daniel Enright	23	Drumboe Castle	Donegal	Known as the "Drumboe Martyrs," found guilty of possession of weapons and ammunition, they were shot in reprisal for the killing of a Free State officer, Captain Bernard Cannon.
14 March 1923	Charlie Daly	28	Drumboe Castle	Donegal	Known as the "Drumboe Martyrs," found guilty of possession of weapons and ammunition, they were shot in reprisal for the killing of a Free State officer, Captain Bernard Cannon.
11 April 1923	James (Seamus) O'Malley	28	Tuam Military Barracks	Galway	Known as the "Tuam Martyrs", all were convicted of having rifles and ammunition, and captured after a firefight at Cluide, Corrandulla.
11 April 1923	Francis (Frank) Cunnane	24	Tuam Military Barracks	Galway	Known as the "Tuam Martyrs", all were convicted of having rifles and ammunition, and captured after a firefight at Cluide, Corrandulla.
11 April 1923	Michael Monaghan	30	Tuam Military Barracks	Galway	Known as the "Tuam Martyrs", all were convicted of having rifles and ammunition, and captured after a firefight at Cluide, Corrandulla.
11 April 1923	John Newell	28	Tuam Military Barracks	Galway	Known as the "Tuam Martyrs", all were convicted of having rifles and ammunition, and captured after a firefight at Cluide, Corrandulla.
11 April 1923	John Maguire	30	Tuam Military Barracks	Galway	Known as the "Tuam Martyrs", all were convicted of having rifles and ammunition, and captured after a firefight at Cluide, Corrandulla.
11 April 1923	Martin Moylan	22	Tuam Military Barracks	Galway	Known as the "Tuam Martyrs", all were convicted of having rifles and ammunition, and captured after a firefight at Cluide, Corrandulla.
25 April 1923	Edward Greaney	25	Ballymullen Barracks	Kerry	Arrested in a sea-cave in Causeway; two Free State soldiers were killed in the assault.
25 April 1923	Reginald Hathaway	23	Ballymullen Barracks	Kerry	Arrested in a sea-cave in Causeway; two Free State soldiers were killed in the assault.
25 April 1923	James McEnery	28	Ballymullen Barracks	Kerry	Arrested in a sea-cave in Causeway; two Free State soldiers were killed in the assault.
26 April 1923	Patrick Mahoney	22	Home Barracks Ennis	Clare	Possession of partially loaded revolvers and involvement in the shooting of Private Stephen Canty (National Army).
26 April 1923	Christopher Quinn	19	Home Barracks Ennis	Clare	Possession of partially loaded revolvers and involvement in the shooting of Private Stephen Canty (National Army).
26 April 1923	William O'Shaughnessy	18	Home Barracks Ennis	Clare	Possession of partially loaded revolvers and involvement in the shooting of Private Stephen Canty (National Army).
30 May 1923	Michael Murphy	26	Tuam Military Barracks	Galway	Civilian tried before a military tribunal and executed by the National Army.
30 May 1923	Joseph O'Rourke	23	Tuam Military Barracks	Galway	Civilian tried before a military tribunal and executed by the National Army.

== See also ==
- Timeline of the Irish Civil War
- Free State Intelligence Department – Oriel House
- Capital punishment in Ireland

== Bibliography ==
- Andrews, C.S. (1979). Dublin Made Me. Mercier Press. ISBN 978-0853426066.
- Campbell, Colm (1994). Emergency Law in Ireland 1918–1925. Clarendon Press. ISBN 978-0-19-825675-5.
- Collins, M.E. (1993). Ireland, 1868–1966: History in the Making. Dublin: The Educational Company of Ireland. ISBN 978-0861673056.
- Doyle, Tom (2008). The Civil War in Kerry. Mercier Press. ISBN 978-1856355902.
- Harrington, Niall C. (1987). Kerry Landing. Mercier Press. ISBN 978-0947962708.
- Hopkinson, Michael (2004). Green Against Green: The Irish Civil War (2Rev ed.). Gill Books. ISBN 978-0717137602.
- Litton, Helen (1995). The Irish Civil War: An Illustrated History. Merlin Publishing. ISBN 978-0863274800. OL 1026557M.
- Mahon, Tom; Gillogly, James J. (2008). Decoding the IRA. Mercier Press. ISBN 978-1856356046.
- McConville, Seán (2002). Irish Political Prisoners 1848–1922. Routledge. ISBN 978-0415219914.
- Murphy, Breen Timothy (2010). "The Government's Policy During The Irish Civil War 1922–1923" (PDF). maynoothuniversity.ie.
- Purdon, Edward (2000). The Irish Civil War, 1922–1923. Mercier Press. ISBN 978-1856353007.
- Ryan, Meda (2001). Real Chief, Liam Lynch. Mercier Press. ISBN 978-1856354608.
- Valiulis, Maryann Gialanella (1992). General Richard Mulcahy. Irish Academic Press. ISBN 978-0716524946.
- Wallace, Colm (2016). Sentenced to Death: Saved from the Gallows. Somerville Press. ISBN 9780992736491.
- Walsh, Paul V. (1998). "The Irish Civil War 1922–1923". New York Military Affairs Symposium.
- "The State and Civil War, 1921-1923" (PDF). Oxford University Press. Archived from the original (PDF) on 30 October 2008.
- "Irregulars' Mistaken Tactics". Derry Journal. 12 March 1923. p. 7.
- De Bréadún, Deaglán (31 December 2008). "Free State account of controversial Kerry IRA deaths in 1923 contradicted by Garda report". Irish Times.
- "The Army's Losses. Ugly Methods Employed by Kerry Irregulars". Freeman's Journal. 18 April 1923. p. 8.
- * "Ballyseedy". Ballyseedy. 1 January 1997. RTE.
