= Dublin Guard =

1920s Irish military unit

The Dublin Guard was a unit of the Irish Republican Army during the Irish War of Independence and then of the Irish National Army in the ensuing Civil War.

== Foundation ==
In May 1921 the Active Service Unit of the Irish Republican Army's Dublin Brigade and the "Squad" assassination unit were amalgamated. The Guard was created due to the heavy losses sustained by the Dublin Brigade in their burning of the Custom House on May 25, 1921. Five IRA volunteers were killed in the operation and eighty-three captured. Paddy Daly, previously head of the Squad, was put in command of the new unit.

The Guard became part of the new National Army of the Irish Free State in January 1922. They were supportive of the Anglo-Irish Treaty which split the IRA, in large part because of their personal loyalty to Michael Collins. At this time, its numbers were greatly expanded from a core of IRA veterans to a battalion-sized unit, and eventually a brigade. The Dublin Guard provided most of the ceremonial parties that took over barracks and installations from the British, wearing a dark green uniform with brown leather webbing. When the Free State Army was expanded to over sixty thousand men, most of its troops were equipped with dyed British uniforms and webbing. The Guard, however, retained its original distinctive uniform and was sometimes nicknamed the "Green and Tans" by hardline anti-Treaty IRA men.

== Civil War ==
On the outbreak of the Irish Civil War in June 1922, the Dublin Guard was heavily involved in securing Dublin for the Free State (see Battle of Dublin).

These troops were among the most experienced and motivated men possessed by the Irish Free State in the civil war. For this reason, they were to the forefront in the Free State offensive of July–August 1922 which took the Munster Republic and secured most of the territory of the new state for its government. Among the officers were Brigadier Paddy Daly, as well as David Neligan & James McNamara, both of whom had been spies for Collins in the G Division of the Dublin Metropolitan Police. They landed in Fenit in County Kerry in August 1922 and rapidly took Tralee on the same day, which culminated with the capture of Ballymullen Barracks which was burnt by the retreating anti-Treaty forces. Over the following days, it linked up with troops that landed in Tarbert, other forces moving towards Kerry from Limerick and captured other major towns in the county such as Killarney and Castleisland.

The Guard was charged with putting down the guerrilla activities of the local anti-treaty IRA. They were perhaps embittered by the killing of their erstwhile commander in chief, Michael Collins, and of their comrades in several ambushes. As a result, they acted with great severity in Kerry. Over 40 Republicans died in custody during the war or were summarily shot when captured. On at least three occasions in March 1923, Dublin Guard troops massacred republican prisoners after five of their men had been killed by booby-trap (trap mine) bomb at Knocknagoshel. Particularly notorious was the Ballyseedy massacre, where nine Republican prisoners were tied to a landmine which was then detonated. One of the prisoners survived to recount the incident. However, reprisals by the Dublin Guard against local civilians were rare. One recorded instance came in February 1923, when three individuals later identified as National Army officers shot dead two railway drivers whom they suspected of republican sympathies. Another feature of the Dublin Guard was the high number of combat injuries sustained by its senior officers.

== Disbandment ==
In December 1922, following Collins's death, Liam Tobin formed the Irish Republican Army Organisation (IRAO) taking in Dublin Guard and other Irish Army officers who shared his view that "higher command...was not sufficiently patriotic". President W. T. Cosgrave, head of the government met with the IRAO several times when difficulties arose with an opposing IRB faction of Generals under Richard Mulcahy.

Following a reorganisation of the Free State Army in February 1923 (in early 1923, Paddy Daly was promoted to Major General) the Kerry Command was divided into five battalions, effectively discontinuing the Dublin Guard. After the cessation of hostilities, each battalion was transferred and disbanded. Few members of the Dublin Guard remained in the Free State Army after 1924.
