= SS Lady Wicklow =

Used as a troopship by the Irish Free State

History
- Owner: City of Dublin Steam Packet Company (1890–1924), then British and Irish Steam Packet Company
- Builder: Blackwood & Gordon, Port Glasgow
- Yard number: 230
- Launched: 28 March 1895
- Identification: Official number: 104963
- Fate: Scrapped 21 August 1948

General characteristics
- Type: Steamship
- Tonnage: 1,207 GRT, 470 NRT
- Length: 262 ft (80 m)
- Beam: 34 ft (10 m)

SS Lady Wicklow was a steam-powered ferry built in 1895 in Port Glasgow for the City of Dublin Steam Packet Company. She was 262 feet long and had a beam of 34 feet. She was scrapped in 1948.

During Irish Free State offensive of the Irish Civil War in July and August 1922 the Irish Free State used her as a troopship, firstly to transport 450 officers and men to Fenit, the port of Tralee and then with TSS Arvonia to take troops from Dublin to Cork.
