= Munster Republic =

Nickname for territory held by anti-Treaty forces during the Irish Civil War

The Munster Republic was an informal and colloquial term used by Irish republicans to refer to the territory they held in the province of Munster at the start of the Irish Civil War. The "republic" never claimed to be a state as such, but was a base for the republican civil war aim of creating an all-Ireland Irish Republic.

After the first week of fighting in the Civil War (28 June – 5 July 1922), Dublin was held by those in support of the Anglo-Irish Treaty and the Irish Free State. The main stronghold of Anti-Treaty forces (the Irish Republicans) became the self-styled Munster Republic, consisting of the counties south of a line between Limerick and Waterford. Liam Lynch, the republican commander-in-chief, hoped to use the "Republic" as a means of re-negotiating the Treaty, and ideally reconstituting the Irish Republic of 1919–21. For this defensive attitude, Lynch was bitterly criticised by some other republicans, who felt that he should be acting offensively to bring the war to a quick end.

However, the Anti-Treaty side (who were supported by a large group of rebels from the Irish Republican Army), lacked artillery and armoured cars, both of which the Free State had to borrow from the British. The Free State launched an offensive against the Munster Republic in July 1922. Limerick and Waterford were taken easily, and Cork became the last county independent of the Free State. Michael Collins sent the Free State Army by sea to Union Hall in County Cork and to Fenit in County Kerry. Cork was retaken on 11 August. His opponents then moved into the countryside and continued small-scale guerrilla warfare until April 1923.
