= Calton Younger =

Australian airman and author

Calton Younger (27 November 1921– January 2014) was a World War II Royal Australian Air Force (RAAF) pilot, a writer, and a trustee of several charities. He survived imprisonment in Nazi German Stalag Luft III POW camp and "The Long March" of 1945.

Originally from Kerang in Victoria, Australia, Younger moved to Melbourne with his family while a teenager. While he reportedly intended to undertake a career in journalism after leaving school in 1939, following the outbreak of outbreak of World War II, he volunteered for military service. He joined the Empire Air Training Scheme in 1940 and became an observer (navigator) with the RAAF's No. 460 (Bomber) Squadron based in Yorkshire, England. Shot down during a bombing mission northwest of Paris in May 1942, he was captured and kept as prisoner of war. Younger spent time in camps in both Germany and Poland, including Stalag Luft III and Stalag Luft IV, where he wrote and studied. In January 1945, as Soviet forces approached from the east, he was forced to undertake "The Long March" towards Fallingbostel - from where he was liberated in April 1945. After the war, Younger wrote a personal memoir, a novel and several historical works. Calton Younger died, aged 92, in January 2014.

== Books ==
- No Flight From the Cage (1956; a memoir)
- Ireland's Civil War. New York, Taplinger Pub. Co. 1969. ISBN 978-0-8008-4240-6.; historical
- State of Disunion (1972; historical)
- Less than Angel (1960; novel)
- Arthur Griffith (1981; a biography)
