= August 1922 =

Month of 1922

<<	August 1922					>>
Su	Mo	Tu	We	Th	Fr	Sa
		1	2	3	4	5
6	7	8	9	10	11	12
13	14	15	16	17	18	19
20	21	22	23	24	25	26
27	28	29	30	31

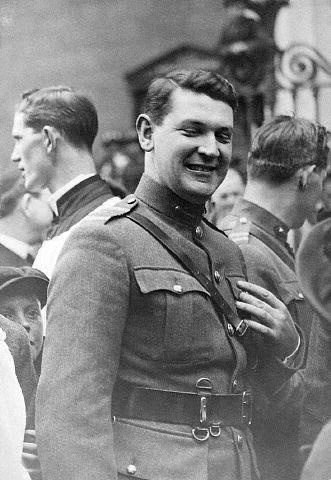
August 22, 1922: Provisional Irish Free State chairman Michael Collins killed in an ambush during the Irish Civil War

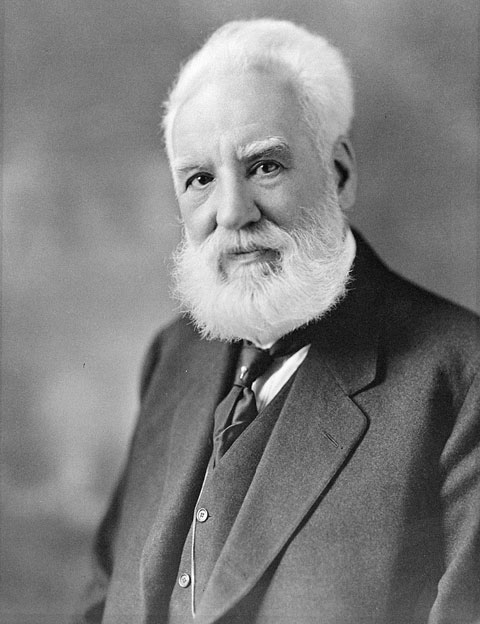
August 4, 1922: All telephones in the United States cease for one minute of silence in honor of telephone inventor Alexander Graham Bell

The following events occurred in August 1922:

== August 1, 1922 (Tuesday) ==
- Britain published the Balfour Note, which declared that Britain would give up reparations claims as well as claims on other Allies to the extent that the United States would do the same with respect to Britain's debts. The Note was met with great anger by the Americans for their being made to appear as greedy and an obstacle to international recovery.
- Forty people were killed and 50 injured when two trains carrying pilgrims to Lourdes collided between Agen and Tarbes, near Auch, France. In all, almost 500 passengers were on the two trains, which were both climbing uphill to Tarbes and Lourdes. According to the investigation, "the first train was too heavily laden and unable to climb a sharp gradient" and "the driver decided to return to Agen and ran down the hill backward" without regard to the second train.
- The House of Commons voted to expel MP Horatio Bottomley, the editor of John Bull magazine and a representative of the Hackney South constituency, after Bottomley's May 23 conviction on felony charges of fraud.
- The International Committee on Intellectual Cooperation, and an advisory organization for the League of Nations to promote the sharing of research findings between nations, held its first session.
- Born: Edith Konecky, American feminist novelist; as Edith Rubin, in Brooklyn, New York City, United States (d. 2019)
- Died: Harry Boland, 35, Irish republican politician; died after being shot two days earlier by the Irish Army (b. 1887)

== August 2, 1922 (Wednesday) ==
- A devastating typhoon came ashore at Shantou in the Guangdong province on the southeast coast of China, killing at least 60,000 people.
- Born:
  - Paul Laxalt, American politician, served as Governor of Nevada from 1967 to 1971, U.S. Senator from Nevada from 1974 to 1987, and chairman of the Republican National Committee from 1983 to 1987; in Reno, Nevada, United States (d. 2018)
  - Betsy Bloomingdale, American socialite and philanthropist; as Betty Newling, in Los Angeles, United States (d. 2016)
- Died:
  - Alexander Graham Bell, 75, Scottish-born American inventor of the telephone; died of complications from diabetes (b. 1847)
  - Lemuel P. Padgett, 66, American politician, served as the U.S. Congressman from Tennessee from 1901 until his death (b. 1855)
  - William E. Crow, 52, American lawyer and politician, served as the U.S. Senator from Pennsylvania from October 1921 until his death (b. 1870)

== August 3, 1922 (Thursday) ==
- Radio station WGY of Schenectady, New York, introduced the concept of the weekly broadcast of a drama series, as "The WGY Players" presented The Wolf, an adaptation by director Edward H. Smith of a play by Eugene Walter. The play was presented as three episodes between piano and soprano solos in a 40-minute concert program that began at 8:45 in the evening. Smith began perfecting radio drama sound effects and the WGY Players presented weekly plays in serial form, each condensed to fit the blocks of time available.
- Two days of street fighting between Socialists and Fascists began in Milan, Italy. The building housing the Socialist newspaper Avanti! was destroyed.
- The U.S. Treasury said that the Balfour Note would have no effect on the American policy towards foreign debts.
- The "lats" was introduced as the currency of Latvia, valued at one gold French franc and equivalent to 50 paper Latvian rubles. It would last until Latvia's annexation by the Soviet Union in 1940. It would be revived in 1993 until replaced by the European.
- The second annual world bicycle racing championship was held in Liverpool, England, and was won by Dave Marsh.
- Born:
  - Su Bai, Chinese archaeologist and bibliographer; in Mukden, Liaoning Province, Republic of China (present-day Shenyang, China) (d. 2018)
  - F. James McDonald, American automotive engineer and business executive, served as the President of General Motors from 1981 to 1987; as Francis James McDonald, in Saginaw, Michigan, United States (d. 2010)
  - Tom Kines, Canadian musician, folklorist and TV host; in Roblin, Manitoba, Canada (d. 1994)
  - Robert Sumner, American evangelist and author; in Norwich, New York, United States (d. 2016)
  - Mariano Lebrón Saviñón, Dominican author and co-founder of Universidad Nacional Pedro Henríquez Ureña; in Santo Domingo, Dominican Republic (d. 2014)
  - John Eisenhower, U.S. Army officer and ambassador, son of Dwight D. Eisenhower; in Denver, United States (d. 2013)
- Died:
  - Minna Cauer, 80, German educator, journalist and activist (b. 1841)
  - Ture Malmgren, 71, Swedish journalist, book publisher and municipal politician; died of a heart attack (b. 1851)
  - Ben "Sport" Donnelly, 52, American football player and coach, second-known professional player in the sport's history; died after a long illness (b. 1869)

== August 4, 1922 (Friday) ==
- A contingent of 1,500 National Army of Ireland troops landed in ships at three ports of County Kerry to retake the area of Munster from the Irish Republican Army, with 450 coming ashore at Fenit on the ferry SS Lady Wicklow and others landing at Tralee and Passage West.
- At 6:25 p.m. Eastern time, the time of the burial of Alexander Graham Bell, all telephone service in the United States was suspended for one minute.
- The Aliens Decree was issued by the Bolshevik government of the Byelorussian Soviet Socialist Republic, specifying which Belarusians could be citizens of the Soviet Union. All former subjects of the Russian Empire who were at least 14 years old and permanent residents were allowed to apply for citizenship, and all children younger than 14 were granted automatic citizenship. Citizenship could be denied to those who had defied the Soviet government or who failed to apply by the end of the year.
- Born: Loro Boriçi, Albanian soccer football forward and manager of the Albania national team; as Lorenco Boriçi, in Shkodër, Principality of Albania (present-day Albania) (d. 1984)
- Died:
  - Nikolai Belelubsky, 77, Russian civil engineer and leading bridge designer in Imperial Russia (b. 1845)
  - Nikolai Nebogatov, 73, rear admiral in the Imperial Russian Navy who surrendered his fleet to the Japanese Imperial Navy in the 1905 Battle of Tsushima (b. 1849)
  - General Enver Pasha, 40, Ottoman Turkish military officer, revolutionary and convicted war criminal, served as the Minister of War and leader of the "Army of Islam"; killed in battle near the village of Ab-i-Derya outside of the city of Dushanbe after coming under attack by an ethnic Armenian brigade of the Soviet Red Army (b. 1881). Enver had been convicted of war crimes in a court-martial in 1920 for his role in the massacre of Armenians.

== August 5, 1922 (Saturday) ==
- A train collision in Sulphur Springs, Missouri killed 34 people and injured 186, the worst train disaster in Missouri history. The Missouri Pacific express train 4, running from Fort Worth, Texas to St. Louis, crashed into a slower moving local train with 100 passengers, which had stopped at the Sulphur Springs station to take on water, and the local's wooden coaches were splintered. Many of the victims who survived the initial impact were scalded by steam from the No. 4 engine, while others drowned when their train cars rolled down an embankment into a creek. An inquest concluded that the express train engineer, who was killed in the accident, had been negligent in failing to observe a stop signal because he had been reading orders handed to him at an earlier stop.
- Taxi driver Arthur Partridge introduced an independent bus service, "Chocolate Express." Partridge became the first to challenge the monopoly that was held in London by the British Electric Traction and Underground Electric Railways. Within two years, other independent bus companies, referred to as "pirate operators," would follow Partridge's lead and as many as 500 independent buses would be competing the BET/UER monopoly for customers on London's streets. The independents would be outlawed by the London Traffic Act 1924, which limited bus operations to those licensed by the city.
- Albert Einstein left Germany due to threats on his life by Organisation Consul, the ultra-nationalist and antisemitic terror group that assassinated Walther Rathenau.
- The drama film Blood and Sand starring Rudolph Valentino and Lila Lee premiered in Los Angeles.
- The Battle of Kilmallock ended in an Irish Free State victory after two days of fighting, as Irish Republicans fell back toward Charleville.
- Born:
  - Ethel Winant, the first female executive in U.S. television as vice-president of CBS; as Ethel Wald, in Worcester, Massachusetts, United States (d. 2003)
  - Sandy Kenyon, voice and character actor; as Sanford Klein, in New York City, United States (d. 2010)
- Died: Tommy McCarthy, 59, American baseball player and inductee into the Baseball Hall of Fame, known for his innovations and for being the only Hall member who played in the Union Association (b. 1863)

== August 6, 1922 (Sunday) ==
- Martial law was announced in Genoa, Milan, Parma, Ancona and Livorno to curb Fascist violence. The move came a day after Fascisti invaded and occupied the San Giorgio Palace in Genoa.
- The first specimen of the Dukes' skipper butterfly (Euphyes dukesi) was discovered by entomologist W. C. Dukes in Alabama, and named for him in 1923 by Arthur Ward Lindsey.
- Born:
  - Doug Ford, American professional golfer, winner of the 1955 PGA Championship and 1957 Masters Tournament; as Douglas Fortunato, in West Haven, Connecticut, United States (d. 2018)
  - General Om Prakash Malhotra, senior army officer in the Indian Army, served as the 10th Chief of Staff of the Indian Army from 1978 to 1981; in Srinagar, Princely State of Kashmir and Jammu, British India (present-day Srinagar, Jammu and Kashmir, India) (d. 2015)
- Died:
  - Rear Admiral Uriel Sebree, 74, U.S. Navy officer, Commander-in-Chief of the U.S. Pacific Fleet, leader of two rescue missions in the Arctic Ocean, and served as the second Governor of American Samoa from 1901 to 1902 (b. 1848)
  - Katharina Scheven, 60-61, German women's rights activist and campaigner against state-regulated prostitution (b. 1861)

== August 7, 1922 (Monday) ==
- The trial of 37 defendants in the Inglewood Ku Klux Klan raid began.
- An Allied conference on reparations opened in London.
- The IRA blew up a telegraph cable station in Waterville, County Kerry, cutting communication lines between the United States and Europe. Saboteurs took possession of the principal station operated by the Commercial Cable Company in Waterville and wrecked the equipment. Communication from the U.S. was still possible on the Western Union cable based at Penzance. After more than two weeks of more expensive cables to and from the U.S., the Commercial Cable station at Waterville was recaptured by the Free Staters on August 25.
- Ken Williams of the St. Louis Browns, who would be the home run champion of the American League for the season, became the first player to hit two home runs in a single inning of a baseball game.
- Died:
  - Alexandre Delcommune, 66, Belgian officer in the Force Publique of the Congo Free State who led multiple exploration expeditions of Congo during the country's early colonial period (b. 1855)
  - Paul von Buri, 62, German diplomat who served as the German Empire's Consul-General for Australia and in Shanghai (b. 1860)

== August 8, 1922 (Tuesday) ==
- Benito Mussolini ordered his Blackshirts to demobilize.
- The day after sabotaging the Commercial Cable system at Waterville, Irish Republicans raided the Western Union station at Valentia Island and severed the four remaining transatlantic cables linking the U.S. and Ireland.
- Jazz trumpeter Louis Armstrong played for the first time with a major entertainer, appearing for King Oliver and his Creole Jazz Band at Chicago's Lincoln Gardens.
- Grand Duke Nicholas Nikolaevich of Russia, the second cousin of Tsar Nicholas II, was declared to be the rightful heir to the Russian Imperial throne by a monarchist rebel group in Vladivostok, led by White Army General Mikhail Diterikhs.
- Shogakukan, a Japanese magazine and comic book publisher, was founded in Tokyo, Japan.
- British Royal Navy cruiser HMS Raleigh ran aground at L'Anse Amour, Labrador, and sank. The 800 crew on board were able to evacuate. About 12 sailors drowned or died of hypothermia after the lifeboat they were in overturned. The wreckage remains underwater as an attraction to divers.
- Born:
  - Alberto Granado, Argentine-born Cuban biochemist, doctor, and writer; in Hernando, Argentina (d. 2011)
  - Sir David House, British Army officer, served as the Gentleman Usher of the Black Rod from 1978 to 1985; in Steyning, West Sussex, England (d. 2012)

== August 9, 1922 (Wednesday) ==
- Fourteen people were condemned to death in Soviet Russia for conspiring against the government. The judgments, however, were not enforced and those sentenced were not executed.
- Irish Free State troops landed four ships and 1,500 troops on the western coast of Ireland to invade Cork, Youghal and Bantry, encountering resistance from the Irish Republicans at Bantry. Rebels set Queenstown on fire in their retreat.
- Born:
  - Philip Larkin, English poet and novelist; in Coventry, West Midlands, England (d. 1985)
  - Pat Devery, Australian rugby league five-eighth back and national team member; in Tweed Heads, New South Wales, Australia (d. 2017)

== August 10, 1922 (Thursday) ==
- Irish Free State forces captured Cork, but not before retreating Republican forces set it on fire.
- Stuntman John Stevenson was killed during the filming of an episode of the movie serial Plunder while standing in for actress Pearl White. Stevenson was on location at Columbus Avenue in New York City and was attempting to jump from a moving bus to catch a girder, but lost his grip, fell and fractured his skull. Plunder would be released on January 28 and run for 15 installments.
- Germany and the United States signed a treaty that provided for the establishment of a joint American-German commission to decide the amount of reparations to be paid by the German government to the U.S. The agreement supplemented the U.S.–German Peace Treaty that had gone into effect on November 11, 1921.
- Irish Republican Army terrorists Joseph O'Sullivan and Reginald Dunne were hanged at Wandsworth Prison near London for the June 22 assassination of Sir Henry Wilson, a Field Marshal with the British Army.
- Born: Claudine Mawby and Claudette Mawby, twin sisters who joined their older sister Angela to form The Mawby Triplets as a trio of film actresses; in England. Claudette was killed in 1942 during an air raid on Brighton; Claudine would live until 2012.

== August 11, 1922 (Friday) ==
- Ground was broken on the construction of Soldier Field in Chicago.
- During a debate in the Italian Chamber of Deputies, a Communist deputy said that the recent general strike had failed because the proletariat had been insufficiently armed. Fascist deputies rose and began shaking their fists, and Francesco Giunta pulled out a revolver. The session was abruptly suspended and the galleries ordered cleared, although the chaotic scene of shouting and gesticulating continued for another half-hour.
- Born:
  - Lyle Stuart, American author of books about casino gambling; as Lionel Simon, in New York City, United States (d. 2006)
  - Ron Grainer, Australian composer for British television shows and films, best known for the theme music for Doctor Who and The Prisoner; as Ronald Grainer, in Atherton, Queensland, Australia (d. 1981)
- Died: Umberto Valenti, 30, Sicilian-born American gangster and hit man for the D'Aquila crime family; shot to death in New York City on orders of Genovese crime family boss Joe Masseria, who had lured Valenti to a meeting at a cafe (b. 1891)

== August 12, 1922 (Saturday) ==
- The geographic center of the United States (at the time, consisting of 48 states in the continent of North America) was announced by the U.S. Coast and Geodetic Survey to be in Smith County, Kansas at 39°50' north and 98°35' east, a location about 2.6 miles (4.2 km) from the town of Lebanon, Kansas.
- Britain proposed a two-thirds cut in Germany's reparations payments at the London conference.

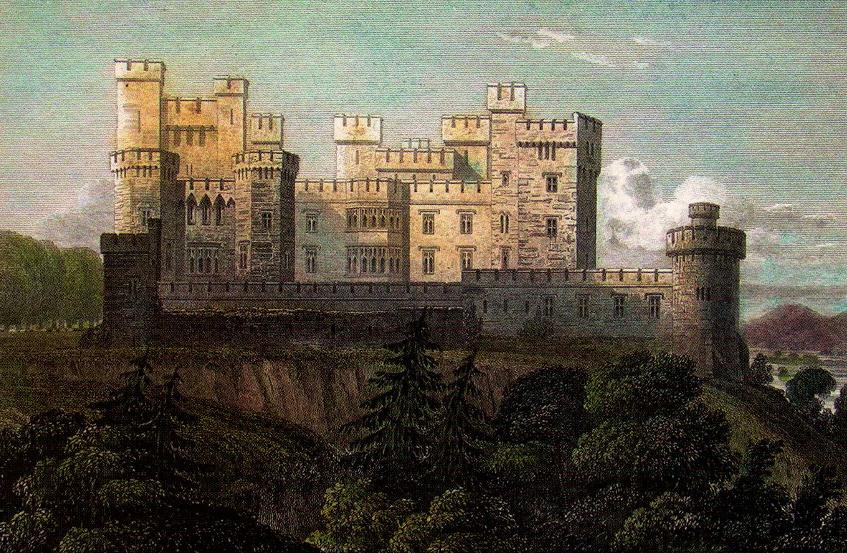
Mitchelstown Castle before its destruction

- Mitchelstown Castle, built in the 15th century, was burned to the ground by the Irish Republican Army, whose soldiers had forcibly seized the edifice in June.
- Born:
  - Humphrey Atkins, British politician, served as the Secretary of State for Northern Ireland from 1979 to 1981 and later as the Lord Keeper of the Privy Seal; in Chalfont St Peter, Buckinghamshire, England (d. 1996)
  - Chunilal Madia, Indian novelist and Gujarati language author; in Dhoraji, Bombay Province, British India (present-day Dhoraji, Gujarat, India) (d. 1968)
  - Ophelia DeVore, American fashion model and businesswoman, first model of African American descent in the United States, co-founder of the Grace Del Marco Agency; as Emma Ophelia DeVore, in Edgefield, South Carolina, United States (d. 2014)

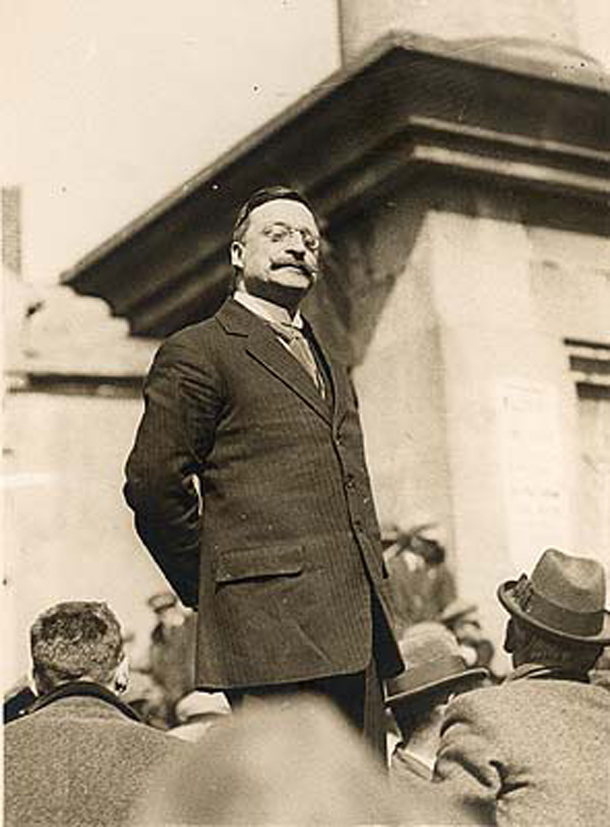
Arthur Griffith a month before his death

- Died: Arthur Griffith, 51, Irish politician and writer, majority party leader in the provisional Irish Republic's parliament, the Dáil Éireann; died of a cerebral hemorrhage (b. 1871)

== August 13, 1922 (Sunday) ==
- U.S. President Warren G. Harding's attempt to mediate the six-week-old railroad strike ended in failure, after leaders of the striking labor unions rejected his plan to have the matter of seniority referred for arbitration by the Railroad Labor Board.
- Died: Howard Crosby Butler, 50, American archaeologist (b. 1872)

== August 14, 1922 (Monday) ==
- The London reparations conference broke off without an agreement.
- A dinner for 48 people led to food poisoning that killed eight who had dined at the hotel in the resort at Loch Marie in Scotland. The first two deaths from botulism happened the next day. The mass casualty was traced to potted duck-paste canned at the Loch Marie Hotel and served to the eight victims in sandwiches.
- Hebrew, Arabic and English were designated as the official languages of Mandatory Palestine as part of the "Palestine Order in Council" issued by the Privy Council of the United Kingdom, with a requirement that all notices of government would be published in three languages. Upon the founding of the nation of Israel in 1948, Hebrew became the only official language but English and Arabic were used for road signs in areas where the Arabic-speaking population (one-fifth of persons in Israel) is predominant.
- IRA insurgents captured Dundalk.
- The Semi-Centennial Geyser erupted in Yellowstone National Park in the U.S., sending columns of water up to 300 feet (91 m) high and scattering debris and rocks as far away as 300 feet (91 m). The location, north of Roaring Mountain, came five months after the 50th anniversary of the March 1, 1872, designation of Yellowstone as the first U.S. national park, prompting the name "semi-centennial". The geyser, located 23 miles (37 km) from Old Faithful, leveled off and ceased eruptions by the end of the year.
- Born: John Grant, Australian neurosurgeon who pioneered parasport competition for disabled athletes; in Sydney, Australia (d. 2013)
- Died:
  - Alfred Harmsworth, 1st Viscount Northcliffe, 57, British newspaper and publishing magnate, owner of the Daily Mail and the Daily Mirror; died of endocarditis caused by a streptococcal infection a year prior (b. 1865)
  - Louis Koemmenich, 55, German-born American composer; committed suicide (b. 1866)
  - Levy Mayer, 63, American civil defense lawyer and one of the wealthiest attorneys in the United States (b. 1858)

== August 15, 1922 (Tuesday) ==
- Germany defaulted on its reparations payment, declaring in a note that due to demand for foreign currency to pay for necessities of life and hyperinflation, it could not afford to pay.
- The Hotel Glória opened in Rio de Janeiro.
- Born:
  - Corporal John P. Fardy, U.S. Marine and posthumous recipient of the Medal of Honor for his bravery at Okinawa in World War II; in Chicago (d. 1945)
  - Major Marina Pavlovna Chechneva, Soviet Air Force pilot and recipient of the title of Hero of the Soviet Union for her bravery in World War II; in Protasovo, Russian SFSR (d. 1984)
  - Lukas Foss, German composer, pianist and conductor, in Berlin (d. 2009)
  - Syed Waliullah, Bangladeshi novelist; in Chittagong, Bengal Province, British India (d. 1971)
- Died:
  - William James Gordon, 59, Jamaican recipient of the Victoria Cross
  - Charles H. Clausen, 79, U.S. Army soldier and recipient of the Medal of Honor for his bravery in the American Civil War
  - Pierre Boutroux, 41, French mathematician

== August 16, 1922 (Wednesday) ==
- Lee de Forest gave reporters the first demonstration of his synchronization of sound and sight on film with what he called "Phonofilm".
- "Shufflin' Phil" Douglas, a baseball pitcher who had helped his New York Giants win the 1921 World Series and who had the best ERA up to that time for the 1922 season, was permanently banned from baseball after offering to take money to quit his team in order for the St. Louis Cardinals to capture the pennant.
- Westside T. Larson flew 1,100 miles from San Antonio, Texas to Rockwell Field in San Diego in ten and a half hours, believed to be a record for that route.
- Born:
  - Jiao Yulu, Chinese Communist Party official, used in promotional campaigns during the Cultural Revolution as a "revolutionary martyr" and the ideal Chinese citizen; in Yuanquan, Shandong province (died of liver cancer, 1964)
  - Gene Woodling, American baseball player, in Akron, Ohio (d. 2001)
  - George Knowland, British Army soldier posthumously awarded the Victoria Cross for heroism in the Battle of Hill 170 in Burma during World War II; in Catford, London (killed in action, 1945)

== August 17, 1922 (Thursday) ==
- Forest fires ravaged northeastern Minnesota, leaving six people dead and hundreds homeless.

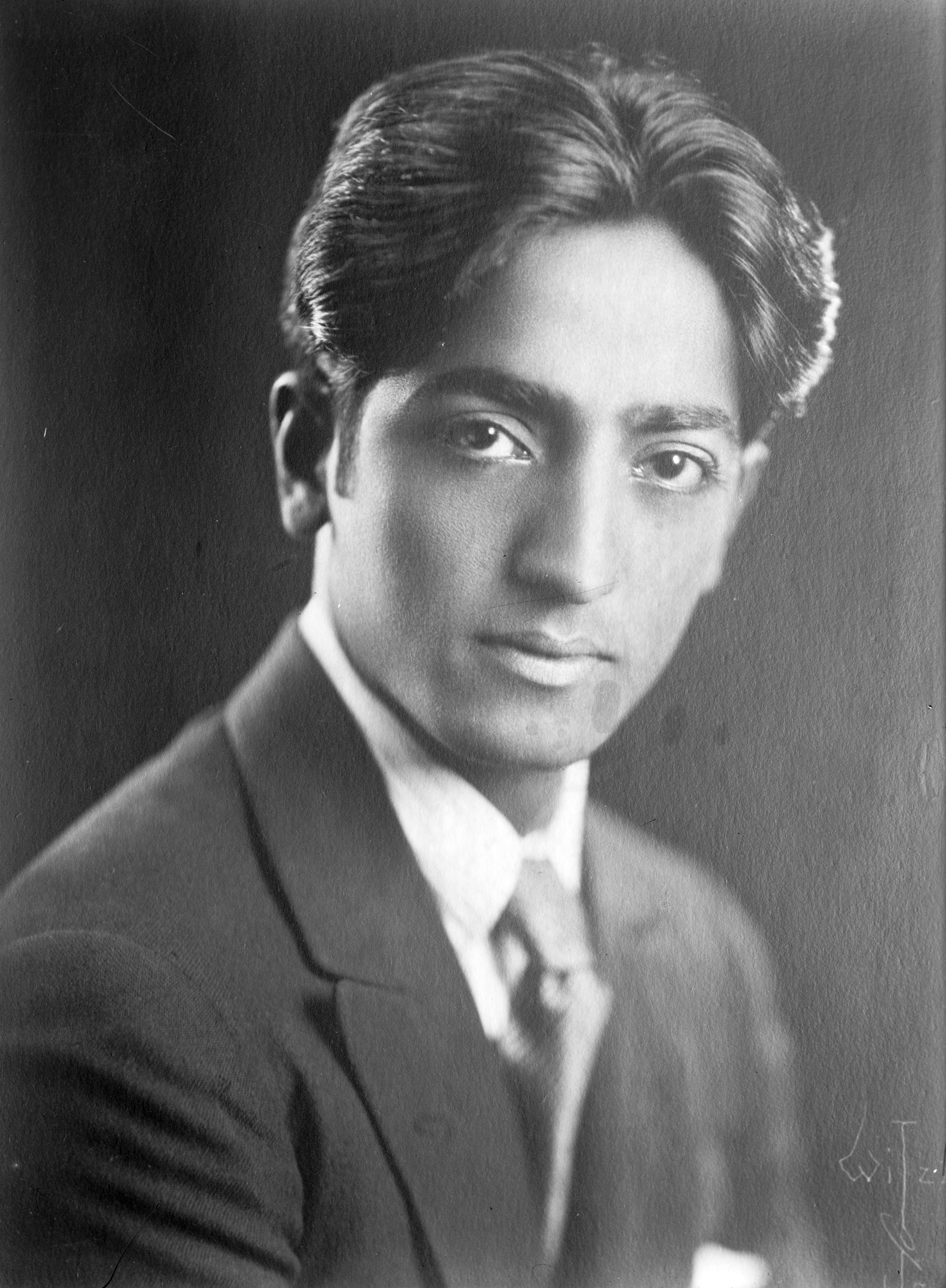
Krishnamurti

- Jiddu Krishnamurti, an Indian resident of the U.S., began what he called " an intense 'life-changing' experience", becoming ill and then semi-conscious, awakening with a new philosophy. For the rest of his life, he would tour the world, write books and attract followers to his Krishnamurti Foundation schools in India and the United States until his death in 1986.
- Father Vladimir Abrikosov of Russia, who had converted from Russian Orthodoxy to Catholicism and then ordained a Roman Catholic priest, was arrested by Soviet authorities for persuading other Russians to become Catholic. Initially sentenced to death, Abrikosov was spared the death penalty and on September 29, he would be expelled along with 150 other intellectuals and live in exile until his death in 1966.
- Sir Gerald Summers, a British Army officer, was appointed by the Colonial Office as the new Commissioner of British Somaliland (now the unrecognized Republic of Somaliland portion of Somalia bordering the Gulf of Aden). He would govern for three years until his death in 1925.
- U.S. Bureau of Prohibition agents began a crackdown on hip flasks, small metal containers used by persons wishing to bring their own liquor with them to a social occasion, giving notice to resort and restaurant operators in New York City that they could be held liable for not prohibiting patrons from bringing alcohol into their establishments.
- Born:
  - Agostinho Neto, the first President of Angola, 1975 to 1979; in Icolo e Bengo, Bengo Province, Portuguese Angola (d. 1979)
  - Rudolf Haag, German theoretical physicist and pioneer of quantum field theory; in Tübingen (d. 2016)
  - Frederick B. Dent, U.S. Secretary of Commerce 1973 to 1975; in Cape May, New Jersey (d. 2019)

== August 18, 1922 (Friday) ==
- The day after Arthur Maertens set a record by keeping a glider aloft for more than an hour at a gliding competition in Germany Frederich Hentzen was able to remain in the air for more than two hours over the Wasserkuppe using the Hannover H 1 Vampyr.
- President Harding addressed Congress on the industrial crisis in the country caused by the railway and coal strikes. He urged the implementation of his recommendations to confront them, which included the creation of an independent federal commission to investigate conditions in the coal industry as well a national coal agency (the Federal Coal Commission) aimed at the prevention of profiteering.
- Died:
  - Dame Geneviève Ward, 85, American-born English stage actress and opera soprano
  - Louis Kramer, 74, American baseball executive and the last president of the American Association, which had challenged the National League as a rival until its demise at the end of the 1891 season.

== August 19, 1922 (Saturday) ==
- The U.S. Senate passed the Fordney–McCumber Tariff Bill, 48–25.
- Palmyra Atoll, a 4.6 square miles (12 km^{2}), uninhabited island in the North Pacific Ocean, within the jurisdiction of the United States but owned almost entirely by one man, Judge Henry E. Cooper, was sold by Cooper to Les Fuller-Leo and his wife Ellen Fuller-Leo, for $15,000 (equivalent to $231,918 in 2020). The Fuller-Leo family would sell the property to The Nature Conservancy in 2000 for $30 million.
- Born:
  - Gwendoline Butler, English mystery novelist who also wrote under the pen name "Jennie Melville"; in South London (d. 2013)
  - H. Bolton Seed, British-born civil engineer and specialist in earthquake-resistant construction; in Bolton, Lancashire (d. 1989)
  - Francis P. Filice, American Roman Catholic priest and religious activist; in Gilroy, California (d. 2015)
- Died:
  - Francis Leon (stage name for Frank Glassey), 77, white American man who specialized in performing as an African-American woman in drag and in blackface to create the character of a prima donna in minstrel shows
  - Felip Pedrell, 81, Spanish Catalan composer

== August 20, 1922 (Sunday) ==
- The first Women's World Games were held in Paris with 11 track and field athletic events. The games were organized by the Fédération Sportive Féminine Internationale under Alice Milliat as a response to the refusal of the International Olympic Committee to include women's events in the 1924 Olympic Games, and were attended by 77 athletes from five nations: Czechoslovakia, France, Great Britain, Switzerland and the United States.
- Cohn-Brandt-Cohn (CBC) Film Sales Corporation, which would change its name in 1924 to Columbia Pictures, released its first feature-length motion picture, CBC's More to Be Pitied Than Scorned. The 58-minute silent film, six reels in length, was a hit and led to more productions by the team of Harry Cohn, Joe Brandt and Jack Cohn.
- Born: George Mackaness, Australian immunologist known for his research into activation of macrophage white blood cells for immunotherapy; in Sydney (d. 2007)

== August 21, 1922 (Monday) ==
- French Prime Minister Raymond Poincaré said that France would not consent to a moratorium on German reparations unless the country's mines and national forests were placed in Allied hands as a guarantee.
- George Bernard Shaw told the Chicago Tribune, "Everyone in Ireland is tired of the present political situation. I don't know what Éamon de Valera and Erskine Childers are after. When popular opinion turned against them they should have accepted the popular verdict and then tried to convert the Irish people to their views."
- Born: Mel Fisher, treasure hunter, in Indiana (d. 1998)

== August 22, 1922 (Tuesday) ==
- Michael Collins, Commander-in-Chief of Ireland's National Army, was shot dead in an ambush at Béal na Bláth (Anglicized as "Bealnablath"). Collins had set out at dawn, accompanied by 20 Irish National Army guards, for an inspection tour of various posts in County Cork. At 6:30 in the evening, as he left Bandon to return to Cork City, an estimated 200 Republicans attacked the Nationals.
- In Bridgman, Michigan, U.S. authorities raided a secret meeting of officers of the Communist Party, the Workers Party of America, but only 17 were caught. The others, alerted to the upcoming raid, fled and were apprehended later in the day, including the U.S. Communist Party leader, William Z. Foster.
- The Rudolph Valentino silent film Blood and Sand, one of the most popular films of the year, had its world premiere at the Rialto Theater in Los Angeles.
- WKAV in Laconia, New Hampshire went on the air, the first commercial radio state in that state and the first north of Boston.
- Born:
  - Micheline Presle, French film actress who appeared in English language and French language movies; in Paris (d. 2024)
- Died:
  - Sir Thomas Brock, 75, English sculptor known for creating the Victoria Memorial outside of Buckingham Palace in London.
  - R. H. Boyd, 79, African-American Baptist minister and founder (in 1915) of the National Baptist Convention of America International, Inc.
  - Henry N. Couden, 79, white American Universalist minister and Chaplain of the United States House of Representatives for 25 years.
  - Fred Oesterreich, 44, American textile manufacturer, was murdered in his home by Otto Sanhuber, one of his former employees and the secret lover of his wife, Walburga "Dolly" Oesterreich. Sanhuber had been hiding in two of the Oesterreichs' homes for more than 8 years.

== August 23, 1922 (Wednesday) ==
- The crew of the American freighter SS Philadelphia mutinied after the ship had been prohibited from leaving the Bay of Naples by Italian customs officials, who had blocked it because of nonpayment for repairs. The men ransacked and burned the ship, rendering it a total loss.
- The Federación Peruana de Futbol (FPF), the national governing body for soccer football in the South American nation of Peru, was founded in Lima with Claudio Martínez Bodero of the Atletico Chalaco team as its first president. The FPF took over the administration of the Liga Peruana de Foot Ball, which held a tournament from 1912 to 1922.
- The city of Riverbank, California, located near Modesto, was incorporated in Stanislaus County. Its population increased 30-fold between 1930 when it had 803 people, to 2020 and now has a population of almost 25,000.
- Born: George Kell, baseball player, in Swifton, Arkansas (d. 2009)
- Died: Albert J. Hopkins, 76, U.S. politician who represented Illinois in Congress from 1885 to 1909, 18 years as Representative and 6 years as U.S. Senator

== August 24, 1922 (Thursday) ==
- The Ku Klux Klan raided a gathering outside the town of Mer Rouge, Louisiana, kidnapped five white men who were vocal opponents of the Klan and murdered two of them, though the bodies would not be found until December. This led to one of the most famous criminal cases involving the KKK.
- The German mark began to crash again, falling to 8,000 against 1 British pound or 2,000 to the American dollar.
- On the last day of the glider competition in Germany, Frederich Hentzen kept the Vampyr motorless airplane aloft for more than three hours and maintained an altitude of 1,000 feet (300 m).
- The body of Michael Collins was brought to Dublin and borne on a gun carriage through the streets as large throngs of mourners watched in silence.
- Born:
  - René Lévesque, Canadian politician and premier of Quebec who lobbied for the French-speaking province's independence from Canada; in Campbellton, New Brunswick (d. 1987)
  - Howard Zinn, American social activist and historian, author of the bestseller A People's History of the United States; in Brooklyn, New York (d. 2010)
  - Walter Rotman, American electrical engineer and inventor who created the Rotman lens to provide multi-beam capability for radar systems, as well as the frequency scanning antenna; in St. Louis (d. 2007)
- Died: William Wilson Talcott, 43, American publisher and former star quarterback, committed suicide by jumping from an excursion boat. His death came on the same day that his wife was released from a mental hospital.

== August 25, 1922 (Friday) ==
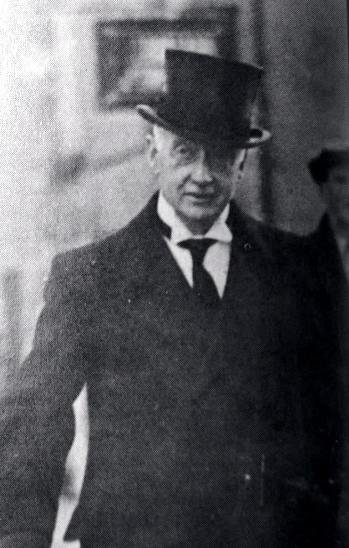
Cosgrave

- W. T. Cosgrave became the new Chairman of the Provisional Government of the Irish Free State, replacing Michael Collins, who had been killed in an ambush three days earlier.
- The Chicago Cubs and Philadelphia Phillies combined to score an all-time major league baseball record 49 runs in the same game. The Cubs won, 26 to 23. Cubs player Marty Callaghan had the distinction of batting three times in a single inning, facing the pitcher thrice in the fourth (when 14 runs were scored by the Cubs), getting hits twice and striking out once. On May 17, 1979, the Cubs and Phillies would combine for 45 runs, with the Phillies winning, 23 to 22.
- Born:
  - Rear Admiral Teme Sejko, Albanian Navy officer executed on charges of planning to sell the ships of the Albanian Navy to the United States Sixth Fleet; in Konispol (d. 1961)
  - Chelo Silva, American actress and singer and star of Mexican cinema; in Brownsville, Texas (d. 1988)
  - Les Schubert, Australian sheep farmer and wool grower with 65,000 sheep and 5,000 square km (1,930 square miles) of farmland; in Peep Hill, South Australia (d. 2012)

== August 26, 1922 (Saturday) ==
- All but seven of the 301 crew of the Japanese Navy cruiser Niitaka died when the ship was driven aground and overturned in a storm off of the coast of the Kamchatka Peninsula.
- All 37 defendants who had been arrested on April 22, in the Inglewood Ku Klux Klan raid, were acquitted.
- The Turkish Army's Great Offensive and the Battle of Dumlupınar began as the last battle of the Greco-Turkish War.
- Henry Ford announced that all Ford Motor Company plants would close down on September 16 because of the industrial crisis, with no definite date for reopening.
- The popular Broadway musical Tangerine, which had premiered at the Casino Theatre on August 9, 1921, closed after 361 performances.

== August 27, 1922 (Sunday) ==
- An underground fire at the Argonaut gold mine in Jackson, California, killed 47 miners.
- A non-binding referendum on prohibition of alcohol was held in Sweden, with about 889,000 (49%) voting "Ja" for banning the sale and over 925,000 (51%) voting "Nej" against it.
- The trimonthly Soviet humor and satire magazine Krokodil published its first issue. At its height, it had 5.8 million subscribers (comparable to the circulation for Time magazine in the U.S. at the same time). Losing popularity after the fall of Communism and the restrictions against the press, Krokodil would publish its last issue in 2000.
- Born:
  - Sōsuke Uno, who briefly served as the 75th Prime Minister of Japan from June to August 1989; in Moriyama, Shiga (d. 1998)
  - Fanny Rabel, Polish-born Mexican mural painter; as Fanny Rabinovich, in Poland (d. 2008)
- Died:
  - Francis S. Peabody, 63, American coal baron and founder of Peabody Coal Company, the largest private coal company in the world. Peabody, who had invited wealthy guests for the first deer hunt of the season at his estate, Hinsdale, near Chicago, had apparently suffered a stroke and searchers found his horse standing beside him.
  - Dr. Stephen Smith, 99, American surgeon who established the first public health agency in the United States, the Metropolitan Board of Health in New York City (1866), and later co-founded the American Public Health Association (1872).
  - David Sharp, 81, British entomologist and editor of The Zoological Record. Among the species named in his honor are flies (Drosophila sharpi in Hawaii), ants (Pheidole sharpi in India) and beetles (Laccophilus sharpi).

== August 28, 1922 (Monday) ==
- At 5:15 in the afternoon, WEAF of New York City, owned by the Western Electric subsidiary of AT&T, made the first-ever broadcast of an advertisement, a radio commercial for a newly opened Queensboro Apartments complex in the Jackson Heights neighborhood of Queens. A man identified as Mr. Blackwell spoke on behalf of Queensboro Corporation, which had paid $50 for 15 minutes of airtime on WEAF and used it to advocate suburban living and to promote the purchase of the rent-to-own apartments in Jackson Heights. Referring to the advantages of an "apartment-home" where one could "enjoy all the latest conveniences and contrivances demanded by the housewife and yet have all of the outdoor life that the city dweller yearns for but has deludedly supposed could only be obtained thru purchase of a house in the country," and closed with the statement "You owe it to yourself and you owe it to your family to leave the hemmed-in, sombre-hued, artificial apartment life of the congested city section and enjoy what nature intended you enjoy."
- Michael Collins was given a military funeral and buried in Glasnevin Cemetery.
- Died: Prince Gaston of Orleans, 80, French-born grandson of King Louis Philippe of France who became an officer in the Army of Spain during its war against Morocco and later in the Army of Brazil in the war against Paraguay, and who had been the groom of Isabel, Princess Imperial of Brazil in Brazil's first and only royal wedding.

== August 29, 1922 (Tuesday) ==
- The sinking of the Chilean steamship Itata killed 309 of the 321 people on board when it foundered off of the coast of Chile at Coquimbo. The ship was reportedly overloaded before it lost its rudder and went down in a gale. While the Itata was able to launch three lifeboats, all three boats capsized, and only 13 survivors reached land.
- Born:
  - Dr. Ralph M. Reitan, American neuropsychologist and co-developer of the Halstead-Reitan Neuropsychological Battery of tests for neuropsychological assessment; in Beresford, South Dakota (d. 2014)
  - Vice Admiral Per Rudberg, Sweden's Chief of the Navy from 1978 to 1984; in Vänersborg (d. 2010)
  - Edwin Q. White, American war correspondent and Saigon bureau chief for the Associated Press during the Vietnam War; in Tipton, Missouri (d. 2012)
  - John Edward Williams, author, editor and professor, in Clarksville, Texas (d. 1994)
- Died: Georges Sorel, 74, French philosopher

== August 30, 1922 (Wednesday) ==
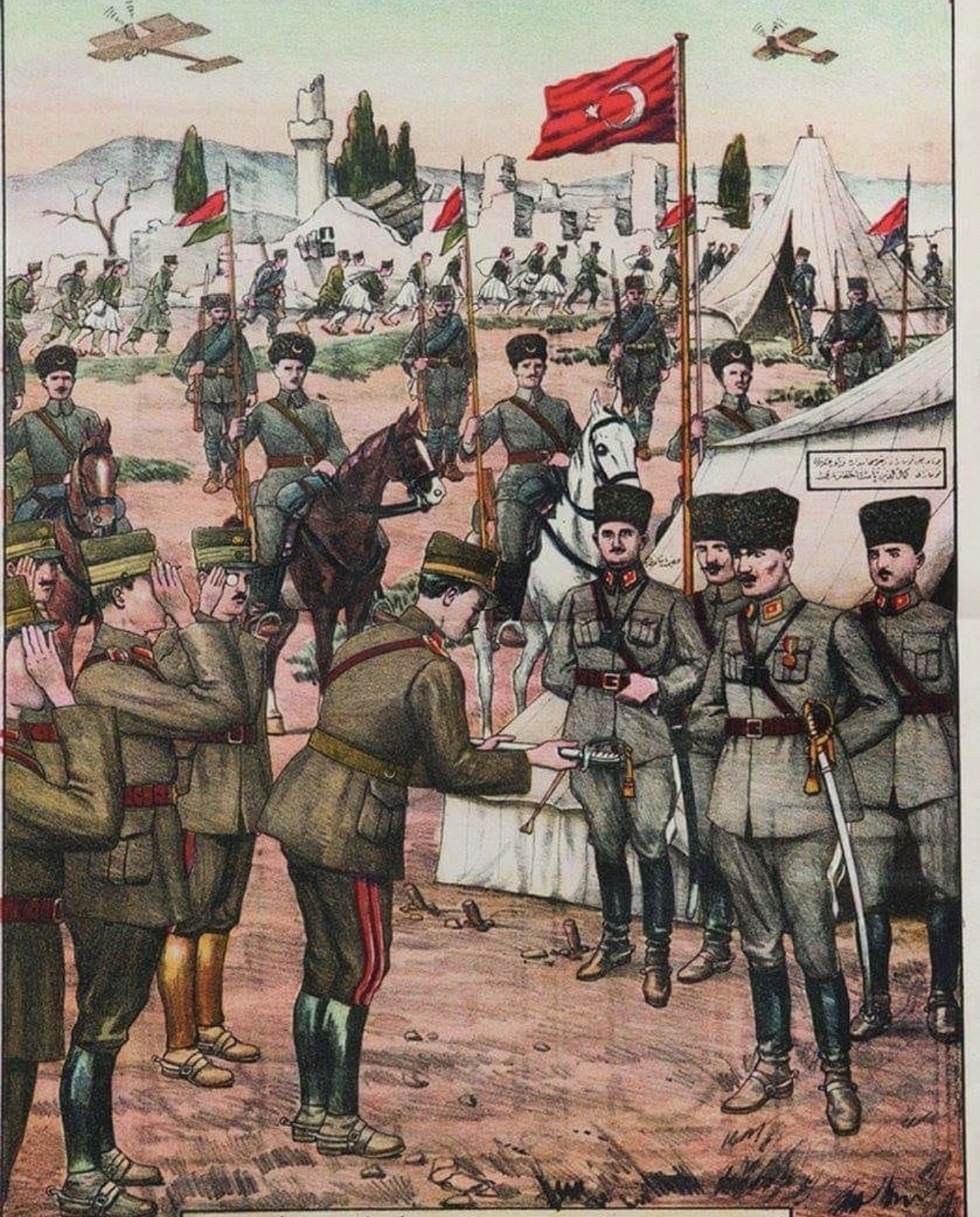
Greek General Trikupis surrenders his sword to Turkey's Mustafa Kemal Pasha.

- At the decisive Battle of Dumlupınar, the Turkish Land Forces effectively won the Greco-Turkish War after more than three years of fighting as it defeated the Greek Army and forced Greece to give up its claims on the area around the city of İzmir (formerly Smyrna) two days later. Greek forces left Asia Minor permanently. August 30 is now celebrated as Victory Day in Turkey as public holiday in honor of the Turkish Armed Forces.
- The Second Irish Provisional Government was set up by pro-Treaty forces nine days after the assassination of Michael Collins, with a government led by W. T. Cosgrave, until the Irish Free State could be constituted on December 6.
- Wisconsin Governor John J. Blaine urged President Harding to ask authority of Congress to take over and operate the coal mines and coal mining railroads to avoid the potential "fatal consequences that are sure to come to the people of this state unless they get coal now."
- Taft College was founded as a junior college in Taft, California
- Born:
  - Regina Resnik, American opera singer for the Metropolitan Opera; in The Bronx, New York City (d. 2013)
  - Willi Dansgaard, Danish scientist and pioneer in the field of paleoclimatology, the reconstruction of information about climate in ancient times by data in rocks, ice sheets and trees; in Copenhagen (d. 2011)
  - Robert Blakeley, American graphic designer who created the fallout shelter sign, common during the Cold War, in 1961; (d. 2017)
  - Barbara Stephens, American investigative journalist who was killed in a plane crash in China while investigating the Chinese government (d. 1947)
- Died: Nellie Grant, 67, American-British socialite who was 13 years old when her father Ulysses S. Grant was inaugurated as President of the United States in 1869 and 18 when she had the second White House wedding of a President's daughter in 1874.

== August 31, 1922 (Thursday) ==
- Former Prime Minister of Mongolia Dambyn Chagdarjav and his successor, Dogsomyn Bodoo were both executed by gunshot after having been convicted on a charge of counterrevolution against the Communist regime that they had helped install in 1921. Their deaths came as part of a purge of officials of the Soviet-backed Communist organization, the Mongolian People's Party by party leader Soliin Danzan. Danzan and his political allies would be executed two years later in a purge within the party in 1924.
- The Allied Reparations Commission unanimously decided to grant Germany a six-month moratorium on reparations payments.
- Al Capone was arrested in Chicago after he hit a taxicab driving drunk, then pulled out a gun and threatened to shoot one of the witnesses.
- The nations of Czechoslovakia and the Kingdom of Serbs, Croats and Slovenes (later Yugoslavia) concluded a treaty at Belgrade, completing the creation of the "Little Entente" that both nations had agreed to with the Kingdom of Romania.
