= Barbara Stephens =

Barbara Stephens may refer to:

- Barbara Stephens (singer) (1939–2005), American singer
- Barbara Stephens (journalist) (1922–1947), American journalist killed in Xinjiang province, China
- Barbara Stephens (actress), Australian actress
- Barbara Stephens on List of Home and Away characters (1988)
- Barbara Stephens, victim of the Flat-Tire murders

== See also ==
- Barbara Stevens (disambiguation)
- Barbara Stephen (1872–1945), English educational writer
