= Steamboat Geyser =

Tallest geyser in Yellowstone National Park

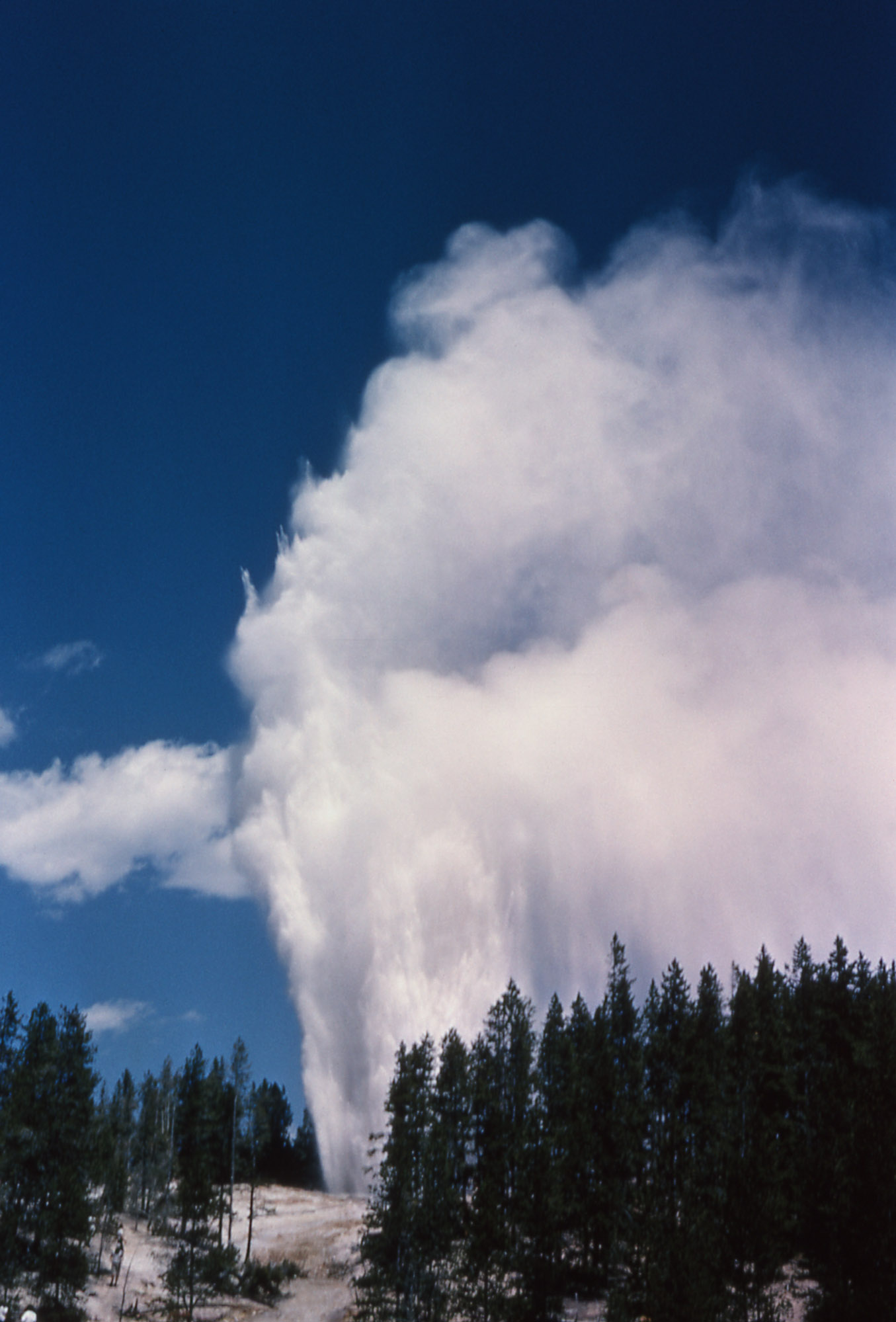
- Major eruption, Steamboat Geyser, circa 1960s

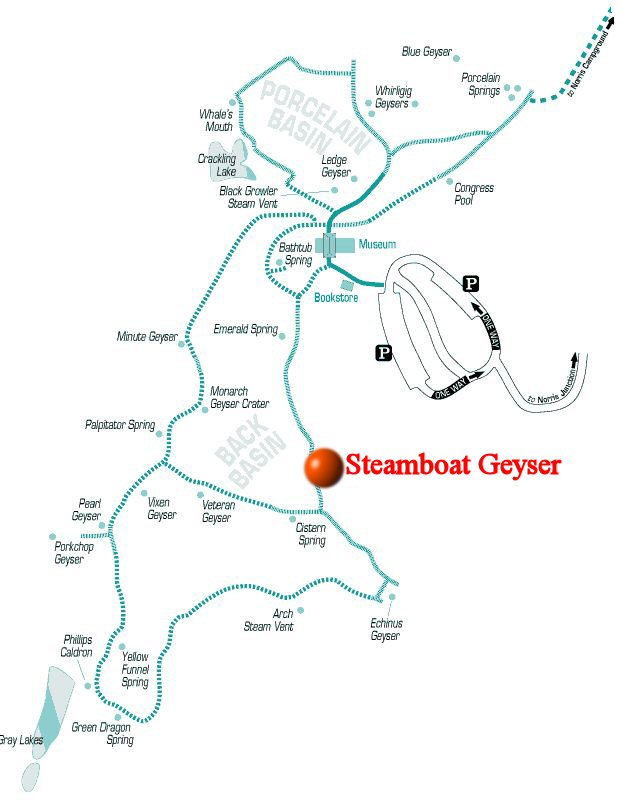
- Norris Geyser Basin
- Location: Norris Geyser Basin, Yellowstone National Park, Park County, Wyoming
- Coordinates: 44°43′25″N 110°42′11″W
- Elevation: 7,598 feet (2,316 m)
- Type: Cone geyser
- Eruption height: 300 to 400 feet (91 to 122 m)
- Frequency: 3 days to 50 years
- Duration: 3 to 129 minutes
- Temperature: 71.3 °C (160.3 °F) on 1998-06-26

Steamboat Geyser, in Yellowstone National Park's Norris Geyser Basin, is the world's tallest active geyser. Steamboat Geyser has two vents, northern and southern, approximately 20 feet (6.1 m) apart. The north vent is responsible for the tallest water columns; the south vent's water columns are shorter.

Prior to 1904, Waimangu Geyser, in New Zealand, had some taller eruptions capable of reaching 1,600 feet (490 m), but in 1904, a landslide changed the local water table, and since then, Waimangu has not erupted. Excelsior Geyser in Yellowstone's Midway Geyser Basin, and Semi-Centennial Geyser just north of Roaring Mountain on the Grand Loop Road were reported to be as tall as Steamboat, both with eruptions reaching 300 ft (91 m). However, Excelsior has not erupted since 1985, and functions as a hot spring, and Semi-Centennial's one eruption of this height was reported in 1922 and it has been dormant since.

Steamboat's major eruptions generally last from 3 to 40 minutes (several durations surpassing an hour were observed during the 2018 active phase), and are followed by powerful jets of steam. During these eruptions, water may be thrown more than 300 feet (91 m) into the air. Steamboat does not erupt on a predictable schedule, with recorded intervals between major eruptions ranging from three days to fifty years. The geyser was dormant from 1911 to 1961. In 1964, twenty-nine eruptions were reported, setting a record for the most eruptions within a calendar year. In 2018, the geyser began a prolonged period of frequent activity lasting through at least 2022, with more than 40 eruptions recorded annually in both 2019 and 2020.

Minor eruptions of 10 to 15 feet (3.0 to 4.6 m) are much more frequent.

After an eruption, the geyser often vents large amounts of steam for up to 48 hours. Sometimes during this part of an eruption, water may return to Steamboat, causing it to jet water once again, though to lesser heights. Cistern Spring, located nearby, will drain completely following a major eruption of the geyser; the spring refills within a few days.

== Recent eruptions and active phase of 2018–2025 ==
The most recent eruption of Steamboat Geyser occurred on February 27, 2026. This was the 173rd eruption since it re-activated in early 2018.

In 2019 the 48th eruption occurred on December 26. That set a new record for the most eruptions within a calendar year. The calendar year 2020 also saw 48 eruptions, tying the record set in 2019.

=== Eruptions from 1990 to 2017 ===
- June 4, 1990
- October 2, 1991 – (1 year 120 days)
- May 2, 2000 – (8 years 213 days)
- April 26, 2002 – (1 year 359 days)
- September 13, 2002 – (140 days)
- March 26, 2003 – (194 days)
- April 27, 2003 – (32 days)
- October 22, 2003 – (178 days)
- May 23, 2005 – (1 year 213 days)
- February 21, 2007 – (1 year, 274 days)
- July 31, 2013 – (6 years, 162 days)
- September 3, 2014 – (1 year 34 days)

=== Active phase since 2018 ===
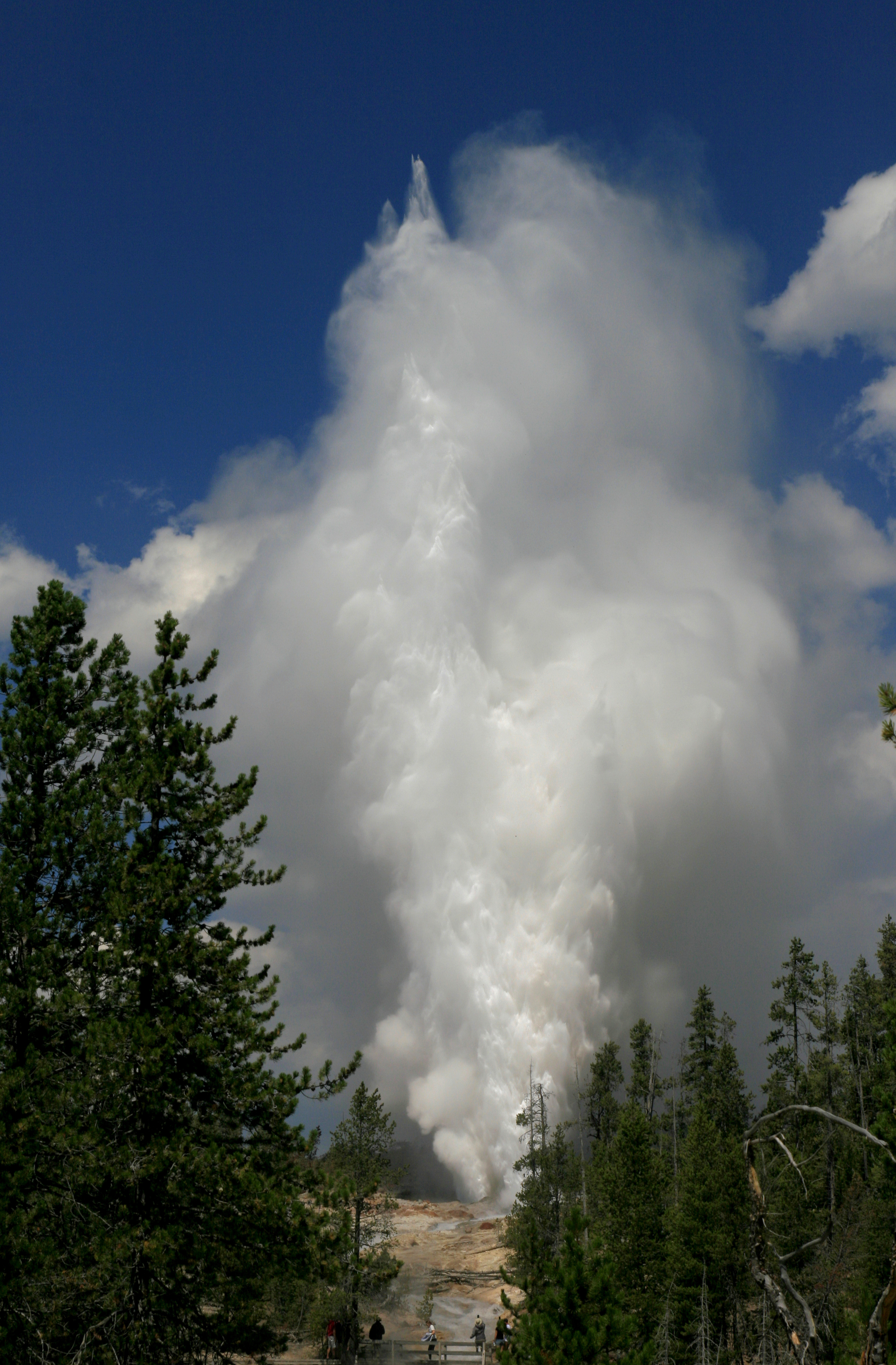
Steamboat Geyser, major eruption, August 4, 2018

In 2018, Steamboat Geyser entered a much more active period with 165 major eruptions recorded between March 15, 2018, and May 7, 2023 32 eruptions occurred in 2018, 48 in 2019, 48 in 2020, 20 in 2021, 11 in 2022 and another 9 in 2023. This broke 1964's record of 29 eruptions within a calendar year. The 2018 record was broken on August 27, 2019, with the 33rd major eruption of the year.

==== 2018 ====
- March 15, 2018 – (3 years 193 days)
- April 19, 2018 – (35 days)
- April 27, 2018 – (8 days)
- May 4, 2018 – (7 days)
- May 13, 2018 – (9 days)
- May 19, 2018 – (6 days)
- May 27, 2018 – (8 days)
- June 4, 2018 – (8 days)
- June 11, 2018 – (7 days)
- June 15, 2018 – (4 days)
- July 6, 2018 – (21 days)
- July 20, 2018 – (14 days)
- August 4, 2018 – (15 days)
- August 22, 2018 – (18 days)
- August 27, 2018 – (5 days)
- September 1, 2018 – (5 days)
- September 7, 2018 – (6 days)
- September 12, 2018 – (5 days) (Note: USGS' Steamboat counter lists this eruption as 3:23 AM, though in-basin report and seismic signal indicate 4:23 AM as start time. This has since been corrected to 4:23 AM.)
- September 17, 2018 – (5 days)
- September 24, 2018 – (7 days)
- September 30, 2018 – (6 days)
- October 8, 2018 – (8 days)
- October 15, 2018 – (7 days)
- October 23, 2018 – (8 days)
- October 31, 2018 – (8 days)
- November 7, 2018 – (7 days)
- November 15, 2018 – (8 days)
- November 21, 2018 – (6 days)
- November 28, 2018 – (7 days)
- December 8, 2018 – (10 days)
- December 17, 2018 – (9 days)
- December 25, 2018 – (8 days)

==== 2019 ====
- January 4, 2019 – (10 days)
- January 16, 2019 – (12 days)
- January 25, 2019 – (9 days)
- February 1, 2019 – (7 days)
- February 8, 2019 – (7 days)
- February 16, 2019 – (8 days)
- February 25, 2019 – (9 days)
- March 5, 2019 – (8 days)
- March 11, 2019 – (6 days)
- March 17, 2019 – (6 days)
- March 25, 2019 – (8 days)
- April 8, 2019 – (14 days)
- April 25, 2019 – (17 days)
- May 3, 2019 – (7 days)
- May 8, 2019 – (5 days)
- May 13, 2019 – (5 days)
- May 20, 2019 – (7 days)
- May 27, 2019 – (7 days)
- June 2, 2019 ~ (5 days)
- June 7, 2019 ~ (5 days)
- June 12, 2019 ~ (5 days)
- June 15, 2019 ~ (3 days)
- June 18, 2019 ~ (3 days)
- June 23, 2019 ~ (5 days)
- June 28, 2019 ~ (5 days)
- July 4, 2019 ~ (5 days)
- July 10, 2019 ~ (6 days)
- July 18, 2019 ~ (7 days)
- July 24, 2019 ~ (5 days)
- July 30, 2019 ~ (6 days)
- August 12, 2019 ~ (13 days)
- August 20, 2019 ~ (8 days)
- August 27, 2019 ~ (7 days)
  Eruption hit a record 403 feet in height.
- September 3, 2019 ~ (7 days)
- September 11, 2019 ~ (8 days)
- September 17, 2019 ~ (6 days)
- September 25, 2019 – (7 days)
- October 1, 2019 – (6 days)
- October 7, 2019 – (6 days)
- October 16, 2019 ~ (8 days)
- October 22, 2019 ~ (6 days)
- October 30, 2019 ~ (8 days)
- November 8, 2019 ~ (8 days)
- November 17, 2019 ~ (9 days)
- November 27, 2019 ~ (10 days)
- December 8, 2019 ~ (11 days)
- December 18, 2019 ~ (10 days)
- December 26, 2019 ~ (8 days)

==== 2020 ====
- January 9, 2020 ~ (13 days)
- January 23, 2020 ~ (13 days)
- February 1, 2020 ~ (9 days)
- February 12, 2020 ~ (10 days)
- February 21, 2020 ~ (8 days)
- February 28, 2020 ~ (7 days)
- March 6, 2020 ~ (6 days)
- March 15, 2020 ~ (9 days)
- March 24, 2020 ~ (9 days)
- April 2, 2020 ~ (8 days)
- April 10, 2020 ~ (8 days)
- April 27, 2020 ~ (16 days)
- May 8, 2020 ~ (10 days)
- May 14, 2020 ~ (6 days)
- May 19, 2020 ~ (5 days)
- May 23, 2020 ~ (3 days)
- May 31, 2020 ~ (7 days)
- June 3, 2020 ~ (3 days)
- June 8, 2020 ~ (5 days)
- June 12, 2020 ~ (4 days)
- June 18, 2020 ~ (5 days)
- June 23, 2020 ~ (5 days)
- June 29, 2020 ~ (5 days)
- July 3, 2020 ~ (4 days)
- July 9, 2020 ~ (5 days)
- July 13, 2020 ~ (4 days)
- July 19, 2020 ~ (5 days)
- July 24, 2020 ~ (5 days)
  Eruption was measured at
  355 feet by a Park ranger.
- July 30, 2020 ~ (5 days)
- August 3, 2020 ~ (4 days)
- August 8, 2020 ~ (6 days)
- August 14, 2020 ~ (4 days)
- August 20, 2020 ~ (5 days)
- August 26, 2020 ~ (6 days)
- September 1, 2020 ~ (6 days)
- September 9, 2020 ~ (7 days)
- September 16, 2020 ~ (6 days)
  Eruption reached 375 feet in height.
- September 26, 2020 ~ (9 days)
- October 5, 2020 ~ (9 days)
- October 14, 2020 ~ (8 days)
- October 27, 2020 ~ (7 days)
- November 3, 2020 ~ (7 days)
- November 11, 2020 ~ (7 days)
- November 20, 2020 ~ (9 days)
- November 29, 2020 ~ (9 days)
- December 11, 2020 ~ (12 days)
- December 20, 2020 ~ (8 days)

==== 2021 ====
- January 12, 2021 ~ (9 days)
- February 3, 2021 ~ (21 days)
- February 21, 2021 ~ (18 days)
- March 3, 2021 ~ (9 days)
- March 18, 2021 ~ (14 days)
- March 27, 2021 ~ (9 days)
- April 4, 2021 ~ (8 days)
- April 16, 2021 ~ (11 days)
- April 23, 2021 ~ (6 days)
- May 5, 2021 ~ (11 days)
- May 31, 2021 ~ (26 days)
- July 8, 2021 ~ (37 days)
- September 11, 2021 ~ (65 days)
- September 28, 2021 ~ (17 days)
- October 13, 2021 ~ (15 days)
- October 25, 2021 ~ (11 days)
- November 12, 2021 ~ (18 days)
- November 24, 2021 ~ (12 days)
- December 16, 2021 ~ (21 days)

==== 2022 ====
- January 23, 2022 ~ (38 days)
- February 14, 2022 ~ (22 days)
- March 4, 2022 ~ (17 days)
- March 30, 2022 ~ (26 days)
- May 4, 2022 ~ (34 days)
- May 23, 2022 ~ (19 days)
- June 10, 2022 ~ (18 days)
- June 20, 2022 ~ (10 days)
- September 18, 2022 ~ (89 days)
- November 5, 2022 ~ (47 days)
- December 6, 2022 ~ (31 days)

==== 2023 ====
- January 5, 2023 ~ (29 days)
- January 28, 2023 ~ (23 days)
- March 11, 2023 ~ (42 days)
- May 7, 2023 ~ (57 days)
- June 9, 2023 ~ (33 days)
- August 25, 2023 ~ (78 days)
- October 8, 2023 ~ (43 days)
- November 13, 2023 ~ (36 days)
- December 30, 2023 ~ (47 days)

==== 2024 ====
- February 26, 2024 ~ (57 days)
- April 3, 2024 ~ (37 days)
- May 30, 2024 ~ (56 days)
- July 15, 2024 ~ (46 days)
- October 7, 2024 ~ (83 days)
- November 23, 2024 ~ (47 days)

==== 2025 ====
- February 3, 2025 ~ (72 days)
- April 14, 2025 ~ (70 days)
- December 31, 2025 ~ (261 days)

==== 2026 ====
- February 27, 2026 ~ (58 days)

== Gallery ==
Minor eruptions on April 27, 2018

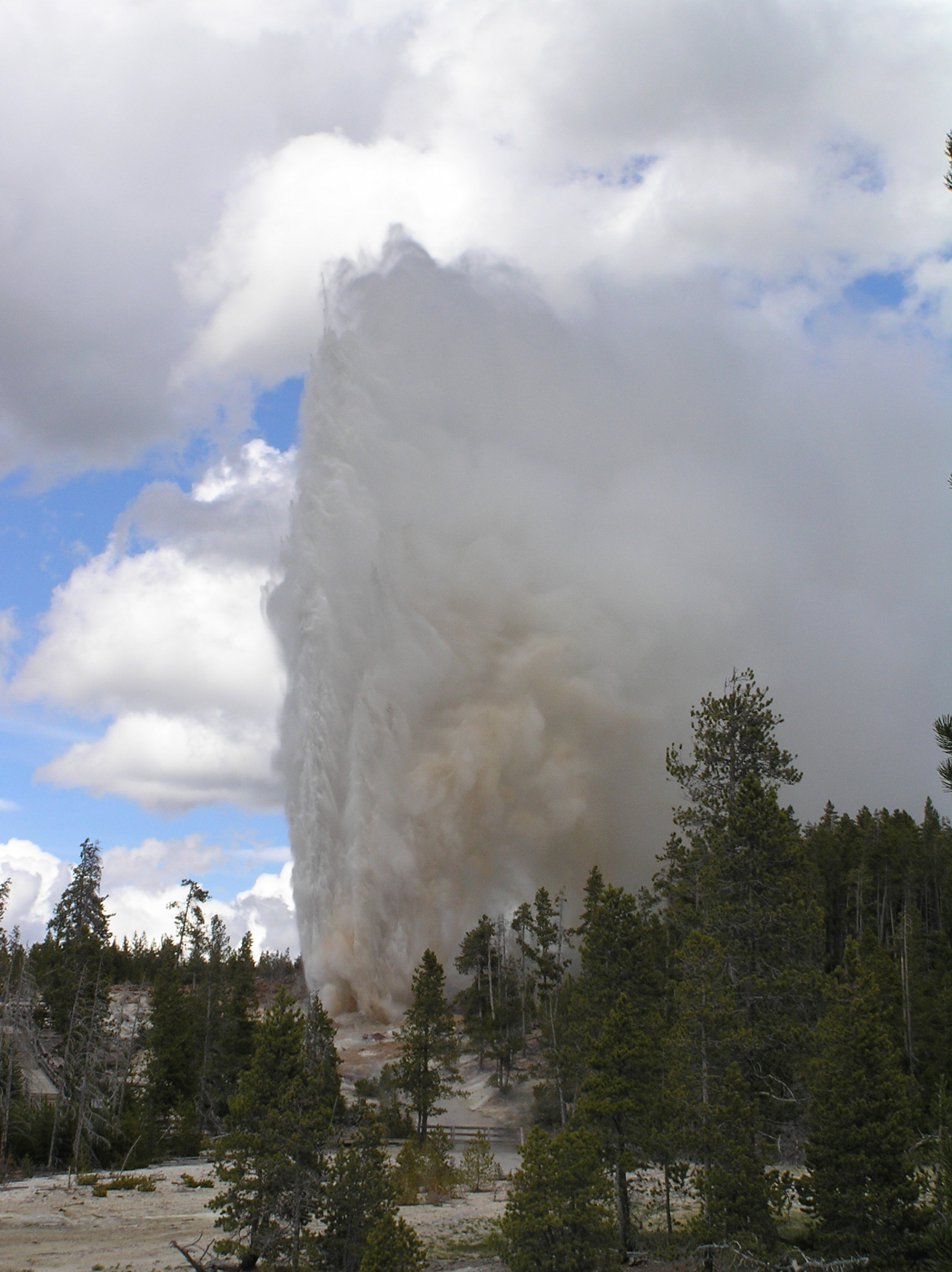
Major eruption on May 23, 2005

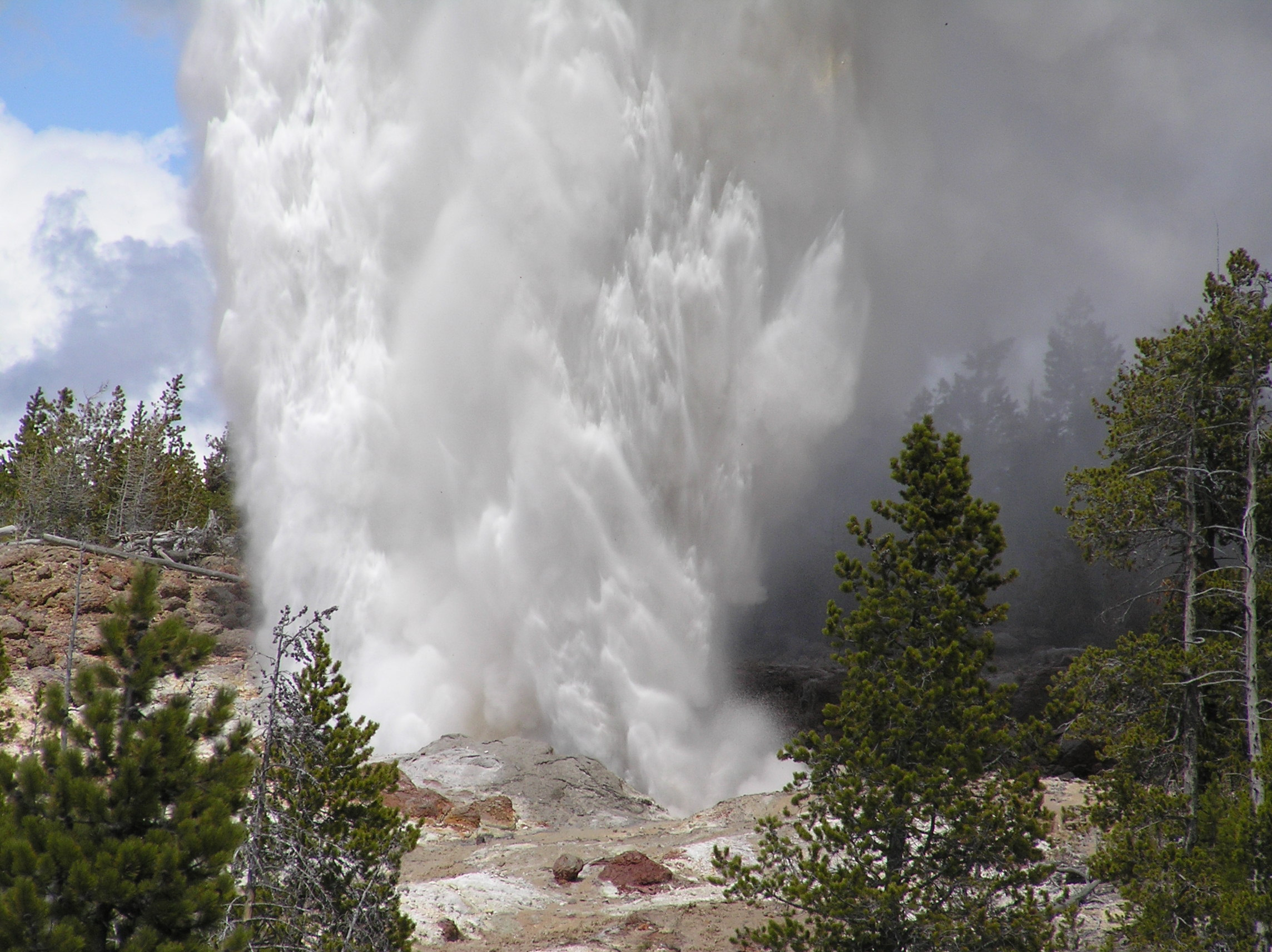
Major eruption on May 23, 2005

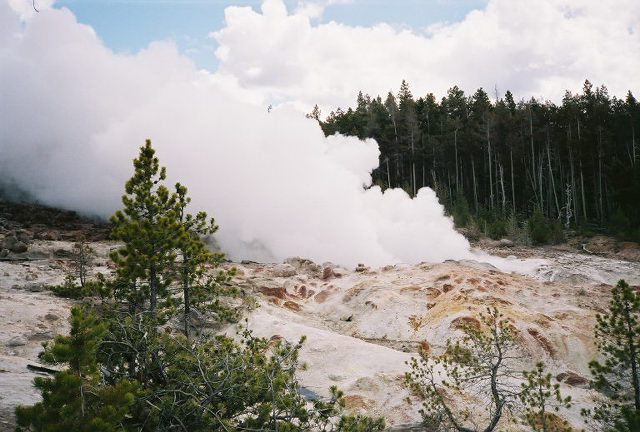
Steam venting on May 24, 2005

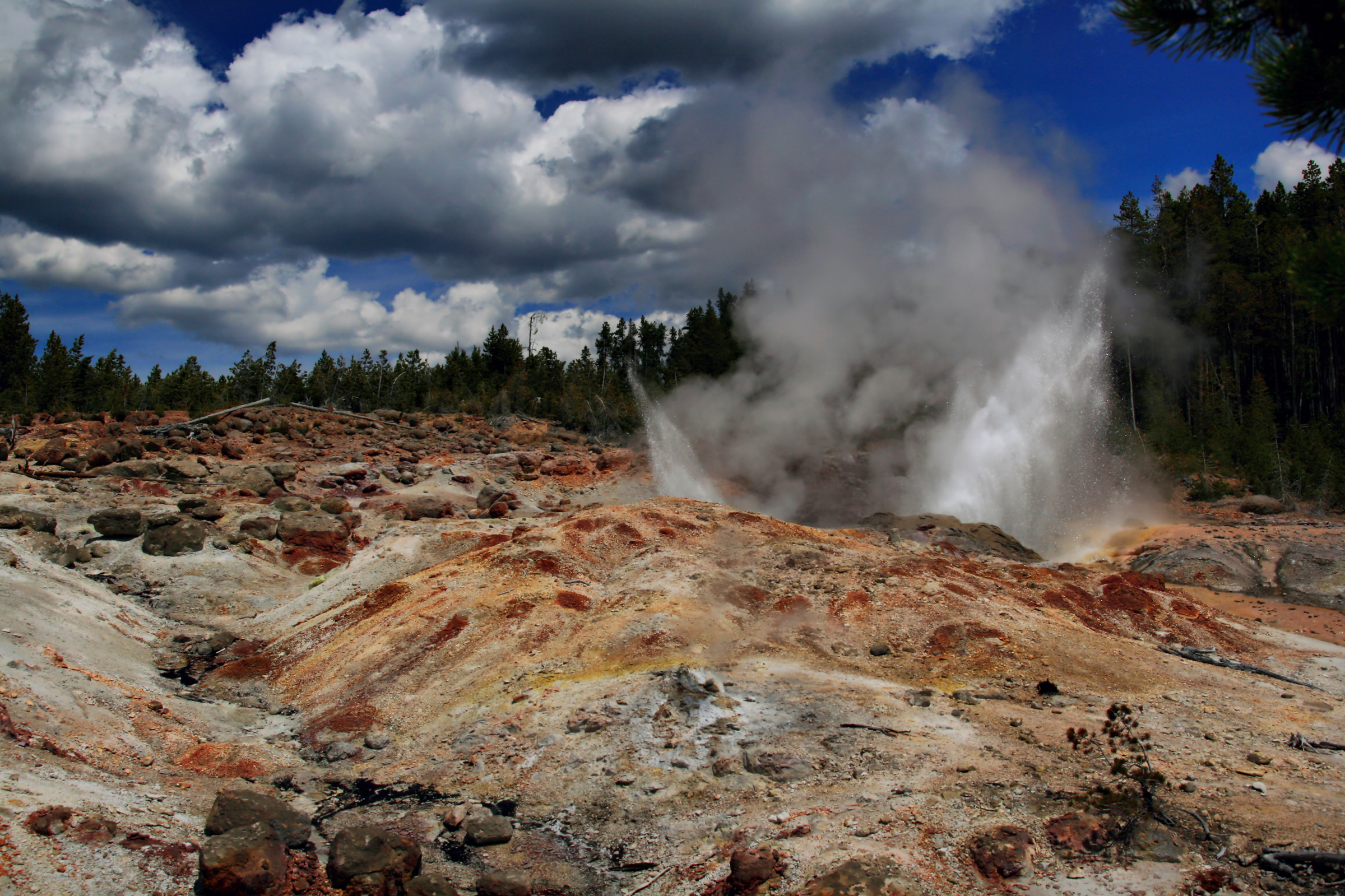
Minor eruption June 22, 2008

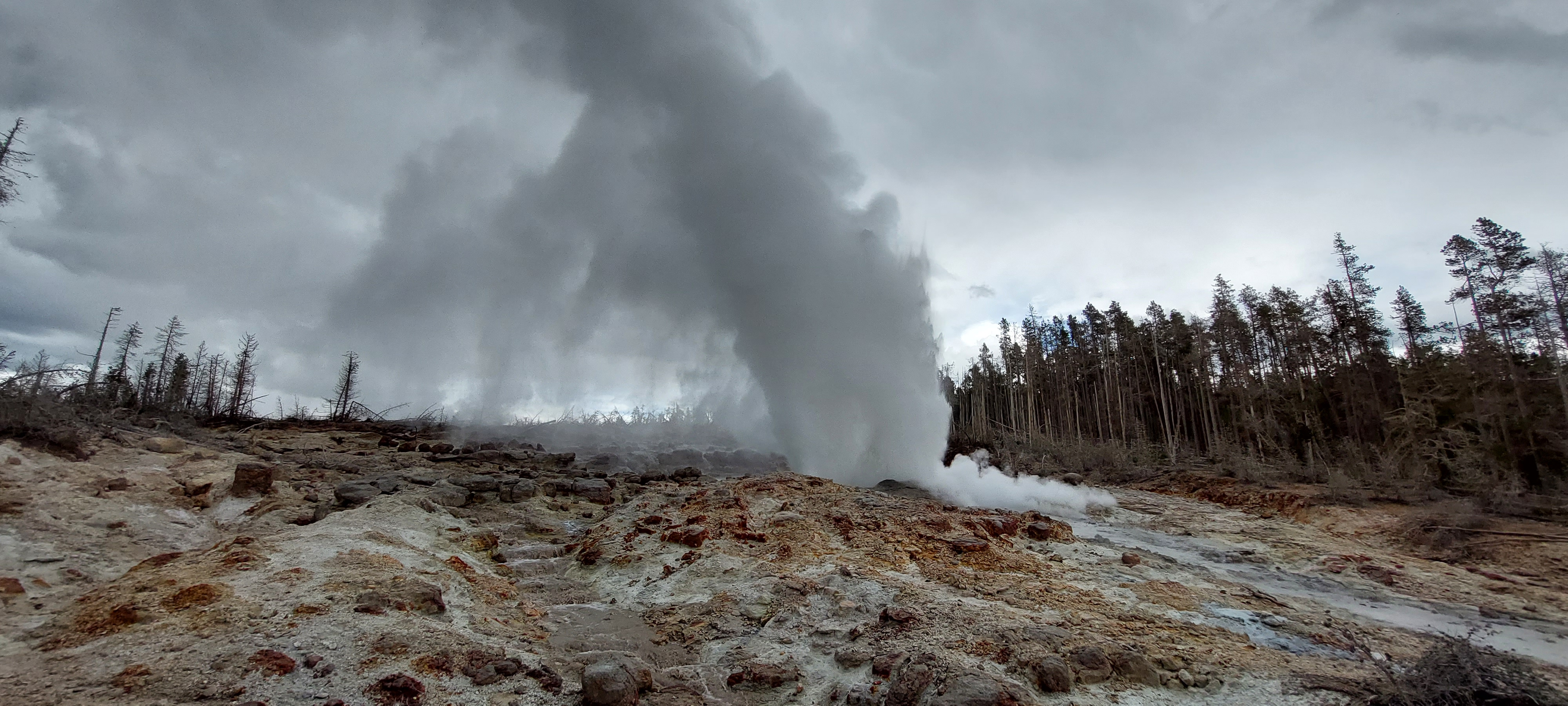
Eruption on September 18, 2022 at 03:26 pm

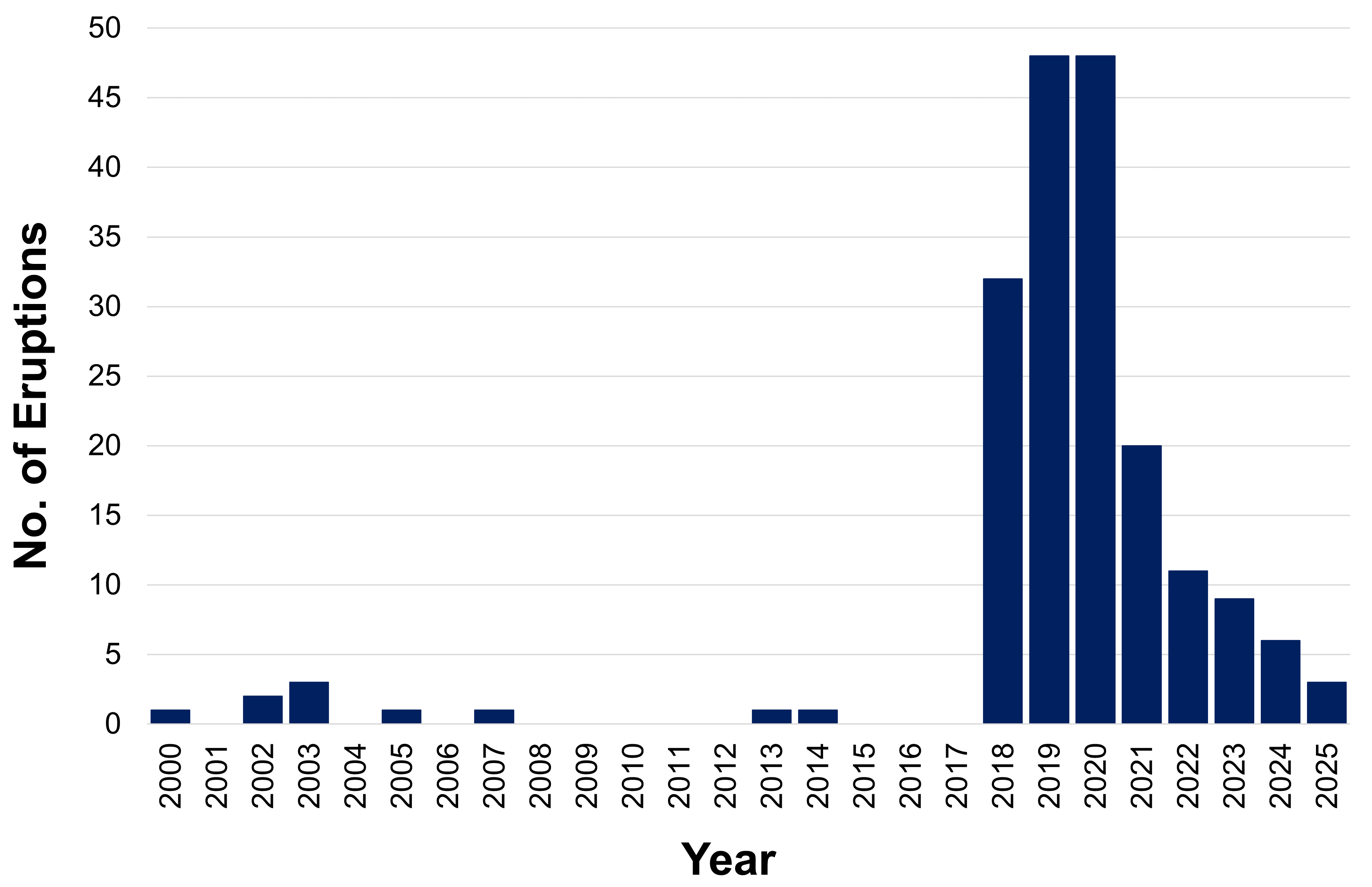
Steamboat Geyser Eruptions 2000–2025

Major steam venting after October 7, 2024 eruption
