= Marina Chechneva =

Hero of the Soviet Union

Marina Pavlovna Chechneva
- Марина Павловна Чечнева
- Born: 15 August 1922; Protasovo, Russian SFSR
- Died: 12 January 1984 (aged 61); Moscow, Soviet Union
- Military career
- Allegiance: Soviet Union
- Branch: Soviet Air Force
- Service years: 1942–1948
- Rank: Major
- Unit: 46th Guards Night Bomber Regiment
- Conflicts: World War II
- Awards: Hero of the Soviet Union
- Other work: Author

Marina Pavlovna Chechneva (Russian: Марина Павловна Чечнева; 15 August 1922 – 12 January 1984) was a Soviet Polikarpov Po-2 pilot and squadron commander in the 46th Guards Night Bomber Regiment (called the "Night Witches" by the Germans) in World War II. She received the title of the Hero of the Soviet Union on 15 August 1946, after having completed 810 sorties during the war. Chechneva authored five books about her experiences during the war.

== Civilian life ==
Chechneva was born to a working family on 15 August 1922 in the village of Protasovo in the Maloarkhangelsk District of the Orel Region and spent her first five years in that area of northern Russia. In 1934 her family moved to Moscow. At the age of sixteen, Chechneva enrolled in an Osoaviakhim flying club, where she learned sport flying. She aspired to become a professional pilot, which was encouraged by her father, forbidden by her mother, and supported by Valeria Khomyakova, one of the club's flight instructor pilots who later became a famous fighter pilot. She became an instructor pilot at the Central Flying Club in Moscow between 1939 and 1941. She joined the Communist Party in 1942.

== World War II career ==
When the Germans invaded the Soviet Union in June 1941, the club evacuated to Stalingrad. In October 1941 Chechneva was permitted to join the new women's aviation group formed by Marina Raskova. After undergoing further training at Engels military aviation school she was delegated to the 588th Night Bomber Regiment as a Po-2 pilot. The unit later received the Guards designation and was renamed the 46th Guards Night Bomber Regiment. In 1942 Chechneva was promoted to flight commander and fought hard in the battle for the Caucusus, for which she was awarded an Order of the Red Banner on 27 September 1942. In late summer 1943, she was promoted to squadron commander and continued carrying out bombing missions as well as training other soldiers. After participating in campaigns for the Crimean peninsula, Belarus, and East Prussia, she was awarded a second Order of the Red Banner. Towards the end of the war, she fought over Poland and was in the city of Świnoujście when victory over the Axis was announced; Chechneva briefly remained in Poland after the regiment was disbanded. During the war. she made 810 bombing sorties over a span of more than 1000 flight hours, dropped 150 tons of materials, destroyed six warehouses, five river crossings, four anti-aircraft artillery batteries, four searchlights and a train, and trained 40 navigators and pilots for the war.

== Later life ==
After the war, in November 1945 Chechneva married fellow pilot and Hero of the Soviet Union Konstantin Davydov. The family moved back to the Soviet Union in 1948, two years after she gave birth to their daughter Valentina in 1946. In 1949 her husband, who worked for the DOSAAF, was killed in a plane crash while ferrying a plane from Leningrad to Kalinin and was buried in the Novodevichy Cemetery.

That same year Chechneva set a speed record on the Yak-18 and was awarded the title Honoured Master of Sports of the USSR. Later she became a certified pilot on Yak-3, Yak-9, Yak-11, and Yak-18T aircraft, and led a female air sports team that flew at parades. She had to stop flying in 1956 for health reasons.

In 1963 she graduated from the CPSU Central Committee Higher Party School. Later she was a member of several committees, including the Presidium of the Central Committee of the DOSAAF, Presidium of the Soviet Committee of War Veterans, and the Committee of Soviet Women, and served as the deputy chairman of the Central Board of the Soviet-Bulgarian Friendship Society. She later wrote several books and memoirs about her experiences in the Second World War.

She died in Moscow on 21 January 1984 and was buried in the Kuntsevo Cemetery. Her obituary was published in the Soviet military newspaper Red Star. There are streets bearing her name in Orel and Kacha.

== Books ==
- The Aircraft Take Off into the Night (1962)
- Fighting Friends of Mine (1975)
- The Sky Remains Ours (1976)
- The Story of Zhenya Rudneva (1978)
- Swallows Over the Front (1984)

== Awards ==
- Hero of the Soviet Union (15 May 1946)
- Order of Lenin (15 May 1946)
- Two Order of the Red Banner (9 September 1942 and 7 March 1945)
- Two Order of the Patriotic War (1st class - 30 October 1943; 2nd class - 30 June 1944)
- Three Order of the Red Star (19 April 1943, 1 September 1953, and 22 February 1968)
- Order of the Badge of Honor (25 July 1949)
- Medal "For Battle Merit" (13 June 1952)
- Honored Master of Sports of the USSR (1951)
- campaign and jubilee medals

== See also ==
- List of female Heroes of the Soviet Union
