= Barbara Stevens =

Barbara Stevens may refer to:

== People ==
- Barbara Stevens (basketball)
- Barbara Stevens in 2004 North Tyneside Metropolitan Borough Council election#Cullercoats
- Barbara Stevens, contestant in Miss Universe 1980

== Fictional characters ==
- Barbara Stevens, fictional ex-wife of Donald Fisher (Home and Away)
- Barbara Stevens, character in Loft (2008 film) and The Loft (2014 film)

== See also ==
- Barbara Stephens (disambiguation)
