= Barbara Stephens (journalist) =

American journalist (1922–1947)

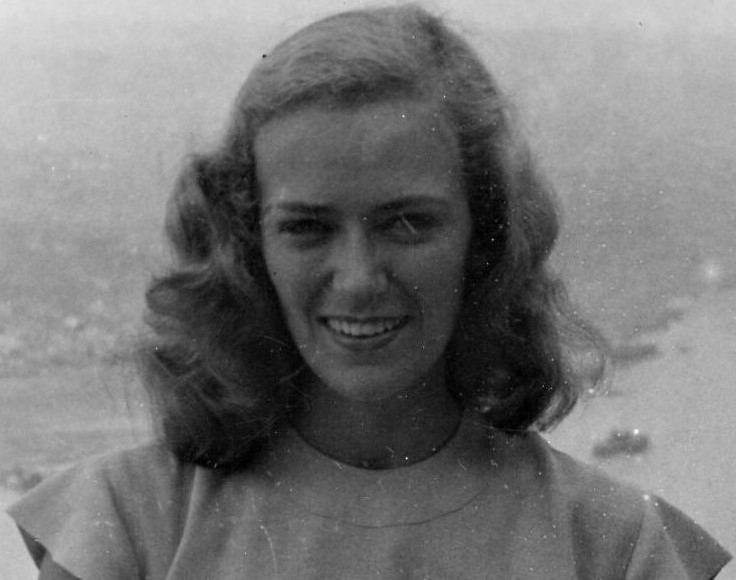
- Barbara Stephens in Chongqing, 1946
- Born: Barbara Ellen Beerbower; August 30, 1922; Yonkers, New York
- Died: July 31, 1947 (aged 24); Gansu, Republic of China
- Occupation: journalist
- Writing career
- Notable works: Strange and Predictable Ways

Barbara Stephens (August 30, 1922 – July 31, 1947) was an American journalist who died in a mysterious plane crash in Gansu, China in 1947. Stephens was investigating the Kuomintang treatment of ethnic minorities in Xinjiang province when in 1947 she traveled to Ili to report on the Soviet-backed Second East Turkestan Republic. That year she was killed in the plane crash on a flight from Ürümqi to Lanzhou via Hami; this plane crash also killed a Chinese artist, a politician and the son of a British member of Parliament.

== Life ==
She was born Barbara Ellen Beerbower on August 30, 1922, in Yonkers, New York, to Louis Dumont Beerbower and Margaret Stephens. Her family relocated to Arlington County, Virginia in the Washington, D.C. area. After her parents' divorce, she changed her name to Stephens, her mother's maiden name. She attended the University of Alabama for a year, then transferred to Barnard College in New York City, from where she graduated.

After college, she took an overseas assignment with the United States Office of War Information (O.W.I.), and was stationed in Chongqing (then romanized in Western sources as "Chungking"). While in Chongqing, she became good friends with, among others, John Hersey, Graham Peck and Christopher Rand, later a China correspondent for the New York Herald Tribune. She appeared in the November 5, 1945, issue of Life magazine ("Life Goes on a Date in Chungking").

At war's end, she resigned from OWI and worked briefly as a stringer for Agence France-Presse, filing dispatches on the Chinese Civil War from her post in Beijing. In late 1946 she journeyed overland to Xinjiang to obtain facts about Kuomintang treatment of ethnic minorities in the province. She was carrying the dossier of her lengthy investigation when the plane crashed. Her remains were recovered several weeks after the crash and interred on December 22, 1947, in a courtyard of the American embassy at Nanjing. Ambassador John Leighton Stuart presided at her funeral service.

According to Peter Rand, the "translated inscription" on the grave marker reads:

You died and went back to the place
Where you are from
But we are still here in this bloody,
Crazy, unlucky world.
But as you know we will fight
Forever without hesitation.
We will never give up, and will
Still drink vodka, and laugh loudly.
Go my dear child without worry.
You will still be alive in our hearts.

== Documentary ==
A 66-minute documentary movie, "Barbara Stephens in China, the Untold Story," was released in 2023. Produced and directed by Barbara Stephens' nephew, David Malbuff, and featuring narration by leading voice actor Vic Mignogna, it had its theatrical premiere on November 18, 2023, and was released on YouTube November 20, 2023. The documentary features Stephens' original photography from China as well as news reports about the plane crash from ABC Radio.

== Popular culture ==
The character of "Alice James" in the historical novel Flash House by Aimee Liu is based on Barbara Stephens, according to the author.
