= Walburga Oesterreich =

American killer (1880–1961)

Walburga "Dolly" Oesterreich
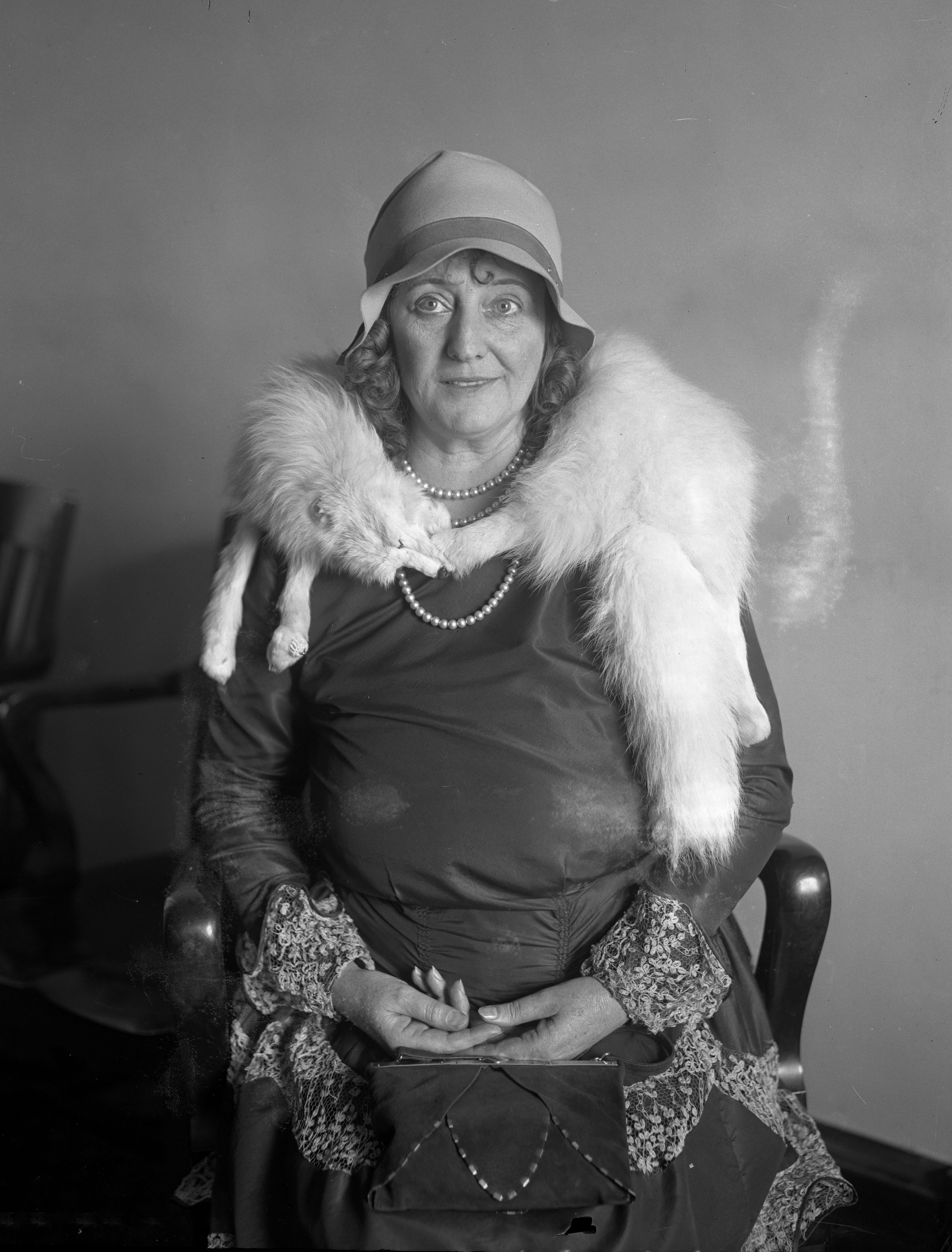
- Oesterreich c. 1930
- Born: Walburga Korschel; 1880
- Died: April 8, 1961 (aged 80–81); Los Angeles, California, U.S.

Walburga Oesterreich (née Korschel; 1880 – April 8, 1961), nicknamed "Dolly" and "Queen of Los Angeles", was an American housewife who gained notoriety for the shooting death of her husband, textile manufacturer Fred William Oesterreich (December 8, 1877 – August 22, 1922), and the subsequent bizarre revelation that she had kept her lover, Otto Sanhuber, hidden in the attic of the home she shared with her husband for ten years.

== Background ==
Oesterreich was born Walburga Korschel in 1880 to German immigrant parents. It is unclear if she was born in Imperial Germany or shortly after her parents arrived in the U.S.A. She grew up in the Milwaukee, Wisconsin area among a community of fellow German immigrants. At age 12, Walburga worked at the textile mill of Fred William Oesterreich, another German immigrant who had become successful and frequently hired fellow immigrants in his factories. Walburga was by all accounts an attractive and charismatic girl, with many friends among the factory workers. She quickly attracted Fred's notice and the two married when she was 17. As Fred's wife, Walburga remained popular among her husband's workers, often peacefully resolving labor disputes by acting as intermediary to the more distant and unlikeable Fred.

From the beginning of the marriage, Walburga was rumored to have invited many lovers into her home during the day while Fred worked at the mills. In 1913, when she was 33, Walburga was introduced to Otto Sanhuber, a 17-year-old sewing-machine repairman who worked for her husband. She invited Sanhuber to her home to fix her sewing machine, beginning an intense affair. To avoid suspicion from the neighbors, Walburga explained that Sanhuber was her "vagabond half-brother".

Gradually, the need to conceal the relationship from both Fred and the neighbors led to Sanhuber's moving into the Oesterreichs' attic, which was accessible through a panel in the ceiling of the couple's bedroom closet. Sanhuber was supplied with a cot, food, a lamp, books, and writing materials. During the day he would perform housework in the residence; at night he would live in total silence in the attic, reading and writing science fiction stories, which Walburga would mail to potential publishers for him. Sanhuber would later describe himself as Walburga's "sex slave" and claimed they made love up to eight times a day. Fred remained unaware of Sanhuber's presence in the house.

In 1918, the Oesterreichs moved to Los Angeles. Walburga agreed to the move on the condition that she would choose their new home, deliberately picking a house with an attic (a rarity in Los Angeles). Sanhuber moved ahead of the Oesterreichs and was already installed in the Los Angeles attic prior to their arrival, where his affair with Walburga resumed.

== Murder ==
On August 22, 1922, after overhearing a loud argument between the Oesterreichs and believing Walburga to be in danger, Sanhuber emerged from the attic and retrieved two .25 caliber pistols from the bedroom bureau. In the ensuing struggle, Sanhuber shot Fred three times, killing him. The two lovers then hastily staged the scene to look like a botched burglary. Walburga gave Sanhuber all the cash in the bedroom, as well as Fred's diamond watch. Sanhuber then locked Walburga in a closet and tossed aside the key before returning to the attic with the money, watch, and pistols. Upon being summoned by neighbors who reported the gunshots, the police, unaware of Sanhuber's presence in the house, strongly suspected Walburga's involvement in the murder but were unable to explain how she could have locked herself into the closet.

After the murder, Sanhuber continued to live in the attic for another eight years. The only notable change in the relationship was that Sanhuber was permitted a typewriter, as there was no longer anyone to hear it. By this time, Walburga was also carrying on an affair with her personal attorney, Herman Shapiro, whom she had hired after being suspected for Fred's murder. In 1930, Shapiro became suspicious after Walburga gave him the diamond watch she reported stolen by the burglars who murdered her husband; she stated that she had later found the watch in the front yard and that the thieves must have dropped or abandoned it during their escape.

Roy Klumb, another of Walburga's lovers, soon discovered that she was having an affair with Shapiro. He went to police and informed them that Walburga had given him a pistol shortly after the murder, asking him to dispose of it in the La Brea Tar Pits. A neighbor also told police that Walburga had given him another pistol shortly after the murder, asking him to dispose of it because it too closely resembled the gun that killed her husband and she "did not want to get into trouble." The neighbor buried the pistol under a rosebush in his garden. Police were able to recover the pistols from both locations. Although badly decayed, both weapons were determined to be of the same caliber that killed Walburga's husband. She was arrested under suspicion of murder.

While in jail, Walburga confided to Shapiro that her "vagabond half-brother" was living in the attic of her home and requested he check on his well-being. Upon knocking on the trapdoor leading to the attic, he was greeted by a thin, pale, but cordial Sanhuber, who explained his true relationship with Walburga and eventually confessed to his role in the murder. Sanhuber was arrested and tried for manslaughter. The unusual circumstances of the case soon reached the press, where Sanhuber was dubbed "The Bat Man."

Sanhuber was convicted of manslaughter, but later released because the statute of limitations had expired. He changed his name to Walter Klein and moved to Canada, where he married another woman, then eventually relocated back to Los Angeles and lived the remainder of his life in obscurity. Walburga's trial ended in a hung jury (with most of the jurors leaning towards acquittal), and in 1936 the indictment against her was finally dropped. She remained in Los Angeles until her death in 1961, at age 80.

== Media ==
Walburga's story inspired the 1968 feature film The Bliss of Mrs. Blossom, as well as two made-for-TV movies: 1995's The Man in the Attic, which stars Anne Archer and Neil Patrick Harris, and 2018's Lover in the Attic, starring Molly Burnett and directed by Melora Walters.

The story was featured in the August 18, 2016 episode of The Dollop podcast.

Walburga was also the subject of a 2017 episode of the Investigation Discovery documentary series A Crime to Remember.
