= Semi-Centennial Geyser =

Inactive geyser in Yellowstone, US

- Interactive map of Semi-Centennial Geyser
- Location: Norris-Mammoth corridor, .25 miles (0.40 km) north of Roaring Mountain, Yellowstone National Park, Park County, Wyoming
- Coordinates: 44°47′10″N 110°44′24″W
- Elevation: 7,533 feet (2,296 m)
- Type: Explosive-type Geyser (Fountain)
- Eruption height: 300 ft (91 m)

Semi-Centennial Geyser is located just north of Roaring Mountain in Yellowstone National Park in the U.S. state of Wyoming. Situated next to the Grand Loop Road, the geyser was first noticed when it had a few small eruptions in 1919. A few years later at 6:40 a.m. on August 14, 1922 the geyser erupted in the first of a series of increasingly violent eruptions. By the afternoon on the same day reports stated that the ejected water was exceeding 300 feet (91 m) in height. By the evening of the 14th, the geyser had scattered debris and rocks a distance of 450 ft (140 m) from the crater. Short lived, Semi-Centennial Geyser has been quiet since and a small pool of water now exists where the geyser erupted. As the geyser showed its biggest activity in 1922, the 50th anniversary of the establishment of Yellowstone National Park in 1872, it was accorded the name of Semi-Centennial.
