= Christopher Rand =

American journalist and travel writer

Christopher Rand (1912, Salisbury, Connecticut – 1968) was an American journalist and travel writer. He moved to San Francisco after graduating from Yale University and began writing for the literary magazine The Coast during the mid-1930s. In 1939, he became a reporter for the San Francisco Chronicle, though he left the publication in 1943 to move to China, where he lived during the end of World War II.

While in China, Rand worked as a U.S. Office of War Information correspondent for a Chinese newspaper and later reported on Chinese affairs for the New York Herald Tribune. In 1947, Rand began publishing long essays in The New Yorker and would continue to do so until his death two decades later. He worked as a correspondent for The New Yorker in such varied locations as Hong Kong, Greece, Puerto Rico, and Bethlehem.

Rand published several books on travel and world cultures, and in 2014 was dubbed "The Consummate Writer of Place" by Colin Marshall of the Los Angeles Review of Books.

Rand died in 1968.

== Bibliography ==
- Hongkong: The Island Between (1952)
- The Twain Shall Meet (1957)
- A Nostalgia for Camels (1957).
- The Puerto Ricans (1958)
- Grecian Calendar (1962)
- Cambridge, U.S.A. (1964)
- Mountains and Water (1968)
- Los Angeles: The Ultimate City (1967)
