= Barbara Stephens (singer) =

American singer (1939–2005)

- Born: Boysa Tatum; November 1, 1939; Atlanta, Georgia, U.S.
- Died: November 3, 2005 (aged 66) Fayetteville, Georgia, U.S.
- Occupation: Singer
- Years active: 1959–1971
- Label: Satellite Records
- Formerly of: The Gardenias, and Deltones
- Spouse: Timothy E. Tatum

Barbara Stephens (born Boysa Stephens; November 1, 1939 – November 3, 2005) was an American singer.

== Early life ==
Barbara Stephens was born in Atlanta, Georgia on November 1, 1939. Her birth name was Boysa Stephens.

== Work ==
When Stephens was a teenager, she joined The Gardenias, and also sung for school events and nightclubs. in 1959 she joined Deltones. She was mostly a solo artist with Satellite Records (later Stax Records), recording several hit songs such as "The Life I Live" and "Wait A Minute".

Singles by Barbara Stephens
Name	Year	Publisher
The Life I Live / I Don’t Worry	1962	Satellite
Wait A Minute / Love Is Like A Flower	1962	Stax
That's The Way It Is With Me / If She Should Ever Break Your Heart	1962	Stax

== Retirement and death ==
Stephens stopped recording and touring in 1971 in order to marry and raise two children in Atlanta, Stephanie Edwards and Shonna Edwards. Her husband was Timothy E. Tatum. She died of sepsis at Piedmont Fayette Community Hospital in Fayetteville, Georgia, on November 3, 2005, at the age of 66.
