= Graham Peck =

Australian rules footballer

Raymond Peck

Personal information
- Full name: Raymond Peck
- Born: 15 May 1930
- Died: 28 July 2015 (aged 85)
- Original team: University
- Height: 179 cm (5 ft 10 in)
- Weight: 81 kg (179 lb)

Playing career^{1}
Years	Club	Games (Goals)
1953–55	Hawthorn	29 (12)
1956	St Kilda	3 (1)
Total		32 (13)
- ^{1} Playing statistics correct to the end of 1956.

Graham Sherwood Peck (15 May 1930 – 28 July 2015) was an Australian rules footballer who played with Hawthorn and St Kilda in the Victorian Football League (VFL).

Peck played VFL football while completing his medical studies at the University of Melbourne and he later served as president and club doctor for the Old Melburnians Football Club in the Victorian Amateur Football Association (VAFA).
