= Balfour Note =

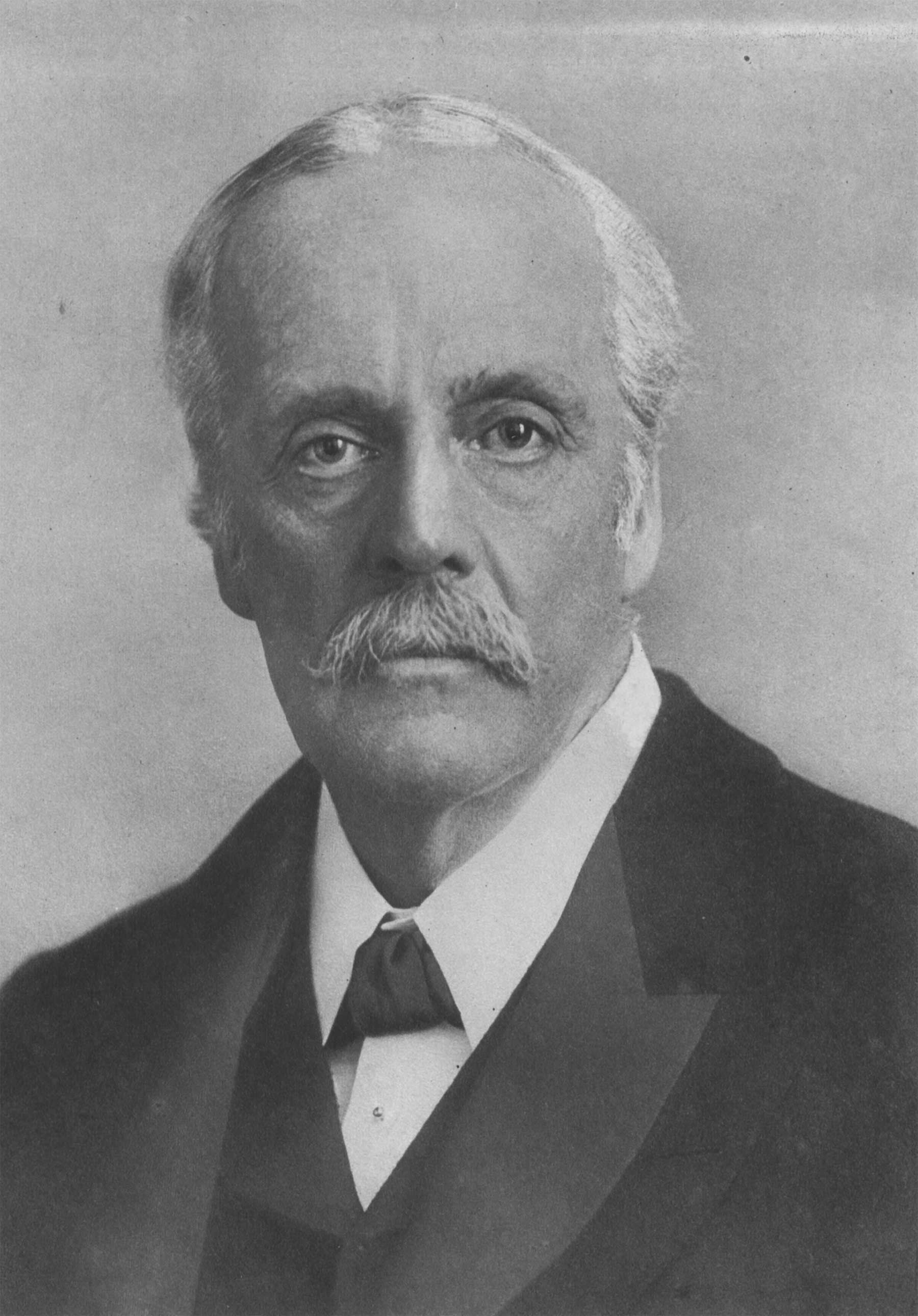
Arthur Balfour acted as British Foreign Secretary during the summer of 1922 as the official Foreign Secretary, Lord Curzon, was ill.

The Balfour Note of 1 August 1922, signed by Britain's acting Foreign Secretary Arthur Balfour, was sent to Britain's debtors: France, Italy, Yugoslavia, Romania, Portugal and Greece. Balfour claimed that the British government had reluctantly decided that the loans that those countries had received from HM Treasury should be paid back and that reparations from Germany should be collected due to the need for Britain to pay its creditor, the United States.

== Background ==
Due to the inadequacy of British industry to produce munitions during the Great War, the British government had required munitions from America, and a large proportion of these munitions had been used by France, Italy and other European Allies. Britain owed America about £850 million, while the total war debts and reparations owed to Britain were nearly four times that figure, including £1.45 billion from Germany, £650 million from Russia, and £1.3 billion from its allies.

== Contents ==
Balfour pointed out that so far the British had not asked the Allies for either the payment of interest or the repayment of capital on the debts owed by them to Britain. However, "the American Government have required this country to pay the interest accrued since 1919 on the Anglo-American debt, to convert it from an unfunded debt to a funded debt, and to repay it by a sinking fund in 25 years." Balfour pointed out the interconnectedness of the combined debts, and suggested that if Great Britain were to repay their "undoubted obligations as a debtor" to the Americans, it would thereby be necessary to enforce her "not less undoubted rights as a creditor". Balfour suggested that the British government was prepared, through an international settlement, to remit (cancel) all debts due to Britain by the Allies along with the reparations owed by Germany, presuming that their obligations to America were also adjusted. Balfour also said:

In no circumstances do we propose to ask more from our debtors than is necessary to pay to our creditors. And, while we do not ask for more, all will admit that we can hardly be content with less. For it should not be forgotten, though it sometimes is, that our liabilities were incurred for others, not for ourselves. The food, the raw materials, the munitions required for the immense naval and military efforts of Great Britain, and half the £2,000,000,000 advanced to allies, were provided, not by means of foreign loans, but by internal borrowing and war taxation. Unfortunately a similar policy was beyond the power of other European nations. Appeal was therefore made to the Government of the United States; and under the arrangement then arrived at the United States insisted, in substance if not in form, that, though our allies were to spend the money, it was only on our security that they were prepared to lend it. This co-operative effort was of infinite value to the common cause, but it cannot be said that the role assigned in it to this country was one of special privilege or advantage.

He then warned of the consequences of international indebtedness:

To generous minds it can never be agreeable, although, for reasons of State, it may perhaps be necessary, to regard the monetary aspect of this great event as a thing apart, to be torn from its historical setting and treated as no more than an ordinary commercial dealing between traders who borrow and capitalists who lend. There are, moreover, reasons of a different order, to which I have already referred, which increase the distaste with which His Majesty's Government adopt so fundamental an alteration in method of dealing with loans to allies. The economic ills from which the world is suffering are due to many causes, moral and material, which are quite outside the scope of this despatch. But among them must certainly be reckoned the weight of international indebtedness, with all its unhappy effects upon credit and exchange, upon national production and international trade. The peoples of all countries long for a speedy return to the normal. But how can the normal be reached while conditions so abnormal are permitted to prevail? And how can these conditions be cured by any remedies that seem at present likely to be applied?

== Reaction ==
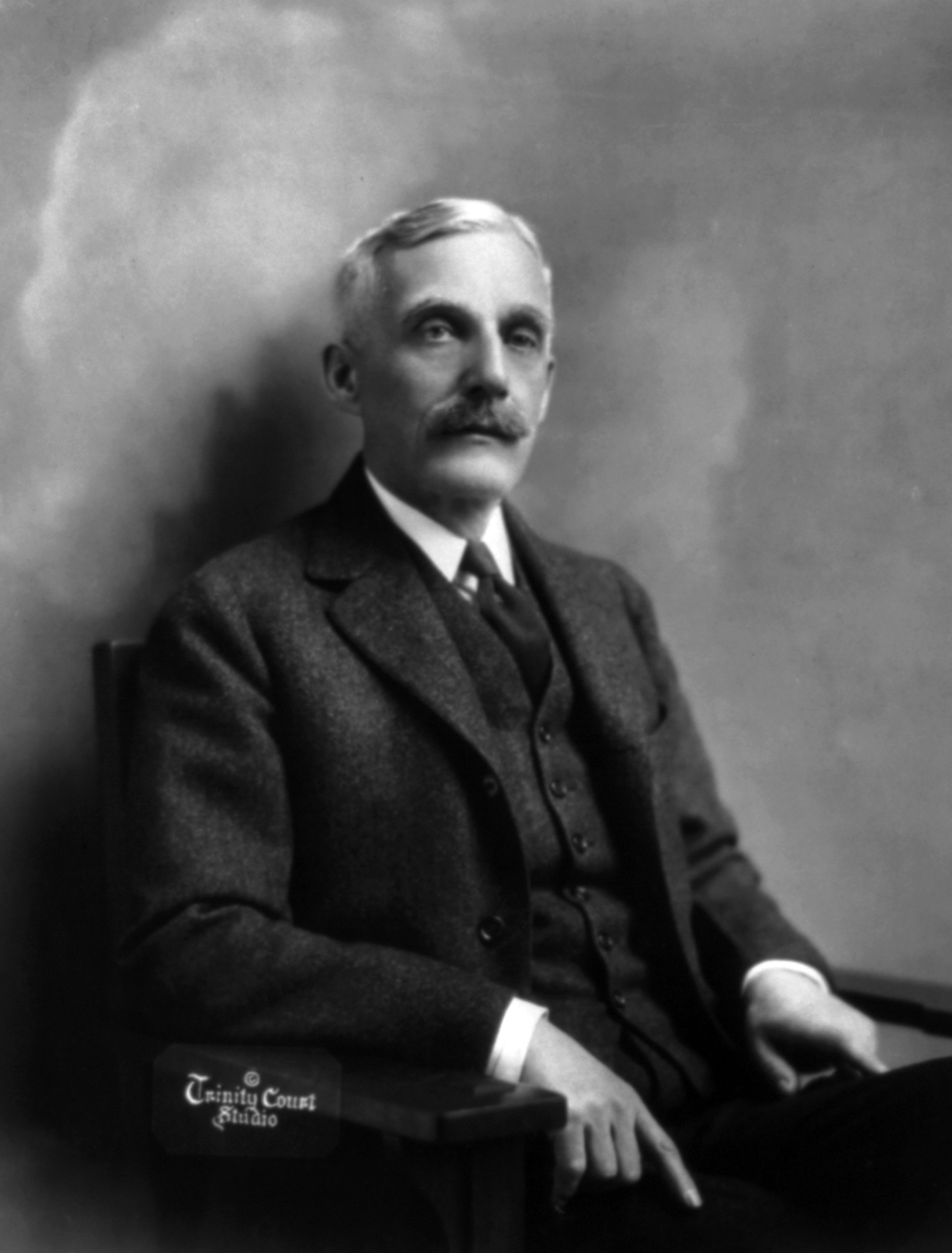
The Note was viewed negatively by the American Treasury Secretary, Andrew W. Mellon

The Note was "universally condemned in the United States". The United States Secretary of the Treasury, Andrew W. Mellon, was furious and regarded the Note as "a lie". The Under Secretary of the Treasury, Seymour Parker Gilbert, said the Note was "dangerously near to an attempt at repudiation...The insistence of the British on the theory that our loans to them were made in order to help their allies is about as irritating a piece of nonsense as has been pulled in the whole discussion about inter-governmental debts".

== Text of Note ==
- "Lord Balfour's Note on Inter-Allied Debts, Federal Reserve Bulletin, Sept 1922" (PDF).
