= Tom Kines =

- Birth name: Thomas Alvin Kines
- Born: August 3, 1922; Roblin, Manitoba, Canada
- Died: February 1, 1994 (aged 71); Ottawa, Ontario, Canada
- Genres: Folk
- Occupation(s): Musician, singer-songwriter
- Instruments: Vocals; Guitar; Piano
- Years active: 1927–1987
- Labels: Folkways

Thomas Alvin Kines was a Canadian folklorist, musician and media personality. He was born on August 3, 1922, in Roblin, Manitoba, and died on February 1, 1994, in Ottawa, Ontario. Kines was a force in Canadian culture, performing in folk and dance music genres, hosting multiple programs on Canadian Broadcasting Company, folk song collector and, later in life, working for the CARES Canada charity. An avid collector of music, instruments and other folklore materials, his collection was donated to Carleton University in 1994.

== Early years ==
Kines began performing music in public at the age of five. He had learned many folk songs, including songs from logging camps, from his Irish grandfather. As a teenager, Kines performed in local dance bands, brass bands and other groups. At the advent of World War Two, Kine joined the Royal Canadian Navy and served in Northern Ireland. After the war, Kine made his home in Ottawa, Ontario and worked for the Royal Canadian Legion. He continued to have an active role in musical culture and helped found the Tudor Singers of Ottawa in 1949.

== Career ==
In the early 1950s, Kines began to gain a reputation as a folk singer. He worked with the National Film Board of Canada, singing on the films the Story of HMS Shannon (1958) and The Chesapeake and the Shannon (1959). In the 1960s Kines performed multiple times at the Mariposa Folk Festival through the 1960s.

== Further resources ==
- Yates, Jim. "Mariposa 1964 - Jim Yates's Photos". Banjo Hangout.
- Gregory, David (2010). "Canadian folk song revival: beginning to boom". Canadian Folk Music. 44 (4). ISSN 1925-3265.
- Conlon, Paula (1993-06-01). "Bridging the Gap Between the Folk Musician and Academia: An Alternative Approach to CSMT as Discussed with Thomas Kines". MUSICultures. 21. ISSN 1920-4221.
