= List of German Consuls-General in Shanghai =

Consul-General of Germany in Shanghai
- Incumbent; Norbert Riedel since 2024
- Style: His Excellency
- Residence: Shanghai
- Inaugural holder: Walter Annecke
- Formation: 1869
- Website: Generalkonsulat Shanghai

The Consul-General of Germany in Shanghai (previously known as the Consul) is the Federal Republic of Germany's diplomatic representative within the city of Shanghai in the People's Republic of China. The consulate was first established as an office of the North German Confederation in 1869 and became the consulate of the German Empire on its formation in 1871. The present Consulate has existed since 1982 at Yongfu lu 181, with the Consul-General's residence in the same street at no. 151.

== Consulate history ==
German contacts in China had been much earlier however, with the Kingdom of Prussia and the German Customs Union sending Friedrich Albrecht zu Eulenburg and a diplomatic expedition to the Far East between 1859 and 1862, visiting China, Japan and Siam. On 2 September 1861, Eulenberg concluded a Friendship, Commerce and Navigation Treaty between Prussia and the States of the German Customs Union and China, effectively establishing for German citizens the same extraterritorial rights enjoyed by the other major powers.

With China's ratification of the treaty in 1863, the German states were accorded the right to establish consulates in China, although Prussia had already established one such consulate in the Shanghai International Settlement in 1862. C.W. Overweg served as the first Prussian Consul and the Free City of Hamburg had also established a consulate in Shanghai at that time. The consulate was first established as an office of the North German Confederation in 1869. Originally only titled as a 'Consul', on 12 November 1877 the serving German Consul in Shanghai, Carl Friedrich Conrad Lueder, was upgraded to the status of Consul-General.

When China entered the First World War on the Allied side in 1917, China broke off diplomatic relations between Germany and German interests were thereafter managed by the Netherlands as the Protecting power. The Consulate-General in Shanghai was reestablished in 1921, following the separate peace treaty with China. This consulate was closed following the outbreak of the Second Sino Japanese War as Nazi Germany was an ally of Japan, and withdrew recognition of the Nationalist Government. In 1941 Germany appointed a new Consul-General in Shanghai dealing with relations with the Japanese puppet Reorganized National Government of the Republic of China, which operated until the end of World War II. The current Consulate-General to the People's Republic of China in Shanghai has been operating since 15 October 1982 and is located in the former French Concession at no. 181 Yongfu lu (formerly known as "Rue du Pere Huc"), with the Consul-General's residence in the same street at no. 151. The residence and consulate are historic listed buildings in the Spanish Mission Style of the 1920s-30s.

== List of Consuls-General ==
=== Consuls, 1869–1877 ===
Name	Tenure Begin	Tenure End	Notes
Walter Georg Alfred Annecke	1869	1875	
Carl Friedrich Conrad Lueder	21 October 1875	12 November 1877	

=== Consuls-General, 1877–1945 ===
Name	Tenure Begin	Tenure End	Notes
Carl Friedrich Conrad Lueder	12 November 1877	1879	
Johann Heinrich Focke	1879	1884	
Johannes Lührsen	1884	1888	
Otto von Strübel	1888	1899	
Wilhelm Knappe	1899	1906	
Paul von Buri	October 1906	February 1913	
Hubert Knipping	February 1913	1917	
Relations suspended due to China's entry into First World War.
Fritz August Thiel	1921	1929	
Heinrich Rüdt von Collenberg	1929	1933	
Hermann Kriebel	1933	1937	
German relations severed after outbreak of Second Sino-Japanese War.
Martin Fischer	1941	1945	

=== Consuls-General, 1982–present ===
Name	Tenure Begin	Tenure End	Notes
Werner Handke	15 October 1982	1985	
Hannelore Theodor	1985	1991	
Helmut Arndt	1991	1994	
Rolf-Rüdiger Zirpel	1995	1998	
Kurt Leonberger	1998	2002	
Wolfgang Röhr	2002	2007	
Albrecht von der Heyden	2007	2010	
Wolfgang Röhr	2010	2014	
Peter Rothen	September 2014	July 2017	
Christine D. Althauser	August 2017	2024	
Norbert Riedel	2024		
