= Paul von Buri =

German diplomat

Consul-General of Germany for Australia
- In office 13 April 1901 – 9 August 1906
- Preceded by: Peter Kempermann
- Succeeded by: Georg Irmer

Consul-General of Germany in Shanghai
- In office 9 August 1906 – February 1913
- Preceded by: Wilhelm Knappe
- Succeeded by: Hubert Knipping

German Minister to Siam
- In office February 1913 – 22 July 1917
- Preceded by: Konrad von der Goltz
- Succeeded by: Relations suspended

Personal details
- Born: 1 June 1860 Gießen, Grand Duchy of Hesse
- Died: 7 August 1922 (aged 62) Seeheim, Hesse, Germany
- Spouse: Charlotte von Bomhard
- Parent(s): Maximilian von Buri; Marie von Ernest

Paul Friedrich Christian von Buri (1 June 1860 – 7 August 1922) was a German diplomat who served as the Consul-General for Australia and in Shanghai.

== Early life and background ==
Born in Gießen in the Grand Duchy of Hesse on 1 June 1860, von Buri was born into a prominent Hessian noble family, which had been ennobled (granting the title 'von') by the Landgrave of Hesse-Darmstadt, Louis VIII, in 1753. His father, Maximilian von Buri (1825–1902), was a jurist who served as a judge of the Reichsgericht from 1879 to 1896 and his great grandfather Ludwig von Buri (1746–1806) was a childhood friend of Goethe. On 14 March 1896 in Leipzig, von Buri married Charlotte von Bomhard (1871–1964), of a prominent Bavarian noble family and daughter of President of the Senate of the Reichsgericht, Ernst von Bomhard. Buri received his education at the Ruprecht-Karls-Universität Heidelberg, the Universität Straßburg and Leipzig University.

== Diplomatic career ==
Buri started his civil service career in 1881 in the Reichskolonialamt ('Imperial Colonial Office') serving as a councillor and was appointed Resident Commissioner in the Marshall Islands protectorate, as a part of the German New Guinea. Buri carried on the negotiations which resulted in the Tripartite Convention of 1899 which decided the question of the Samoan Islands, dividing the island group between Germany and the United States.

Joining the Imperial Foreign Office in 1886, Buri commenced his diplomatic career abroad as Vice-Consul in the British Protectorate of Zanzibar in 1889. Thereafter he served as German Consul to the Cape Colony in Cape Town and the Transvaal Colony in Pretoria. In 1895 he was appointed a counsellor based in the Foreign Office in Berlin. From 1900 he was appointed Consul-General in Basel, Switzerland. At age 40, in April 1901 Buri was appointed Consul-General of Germany for Australia based in Sydney, with responsibility for New Zealand and Fiji. With his arrival coinciding with the beginning of Australian Federation, Buri was the representative of Kaiser Wilhelm II at the occasion of the first opening of the Parliament of Australia in Melbourne on 9 May 1901. In August 1906 Buri was appointed German Consul-General in Shanghai, with responsibility for German nationals in the International Settlement as an extraterritorial power, and in surrounding areas, arriving in October 1906.

In February 1913, Buri was appointed German Minister to Siam, serving until 1917 when Siam entered the First World War on the Allied side. Buri retired on his return to Germany and died age 62 on 7 August 1922 in Seeheim, Hesse.

== Honours ==
- Knight, Fourth Class, of the Order of the Red Eagle (Kingdom of Prussia)
- Order of the Crown, 3rd Class (Kingdom of Prussia)
- Knight of the House Order of the Wendish Crown (Grand Duchy of Mecklenburg-Schwerin)
- Commander of the Order of the Brilliant Star of Zanzibar (Sultanate of Zanzibar)
- Order of the Double Dragon, Second Class, Third Grade (Qing Dynasty)

Diplomatic posts
Preceded by Peter Kempermann	Consul-General of Germany for Australia; 1901–1906	Succeeded by Georg Irmer
Preceded by Wilhelm Knappe	Consul-General of Germany in Shanghai; 1906–1913	Succeeded by Hubert Knipping
Preceded by Konrad von der Goltz	German Minister to Siam; 1913–1917	Suspension of relations due to World War I
