= Flat-Tire murders =

Series of unsolved murders in Florida, US

Details
- Victims: 12–35+
- Span of crimes: 1975 – 1976 (Confirmed)
- Country: United States
- States: Florida, possibly others
- Date apprehended: Never apprehended

The Flat-Tire murders were a series of unsolved murders in Broward and Dade (now Miami-Dade) County, Florida, occurring between February 1975 and January 1976. The name originated from investigators' belief that offender deflated the tires of the victims' cars when committing two of the murders. The list of suspected victims ultimately included twelve girls and women whose bodies were discovered in or near South Florida canals.

== Crimes ==
The suspected perpetrator was described as a white male, aged between 20 and 25, well-dressed, physically athletic and attractive, possibly married, likely very intelligent with an above-average IQ and a sexual sadist. Using his charm, he won the trust of potential victims whom he would lure to his car. A reward of $1,000 was announced for any information that would lead to his capture. Law enforcement postulated that the perpetrator possibly committed other murders across several states since the early-1970s, starting in California. In most cases, the victims, who physically resembled each other, were beaten and raped before death, with the killer stripping the bodies and throwing them in canals, streams, or leaving them near embankments. A total of thirty-five such murders were recorded.

== Victims ==
- 19-year-old Judith Ann “Judy” Oesterling, from Indiana, went missing on February 1, 1975, from Dade County after returning home from her job at a massage parlor. Two days later on February 3, her body was found in a canal bordering Broward County and Dade County.
- Barbara Davis Stephens, 23, went missing on the evening of February 12, 1975, after she said she would travel to Coral Gables to visit a friend. Her car, a cream-olive-silver 1973 Chevrolet Camaro was later found in a parking lot near the center of Miami, with her body later found on February 20 in a wooded lot. She was wearing her clothes, but her underwear had been pulled down and she had been stabbed multiple times in the abdomen.
- 17-year-old Arietta Marie “Renie” Tinker was dropped off by her husband at the Hippopotamus Lounge on Hollywood Beach in Hollywood, Florida at 1:00 p.m. on April 9, 1975. Three days later, her body was found floating in the Snake Creek Canal half a mile east of US 27 in Miramar, Florida. She was believed to have drowned and, although there were no obvious signs of foul play, detectives suspected she was murdered.
- 19-year-old Nancy Lee Fox from West Palm Beach, was last seen alive on the night of June 13, 1975, walking to a local laundromat. Two days later on June 15, her body was found floating in the canal parallel to Highway 27 in Broward County; she had been struck over the back of the head with a blunt object and choked before her body was thrown into the water.
- Barbara Susan “Barbie” Schreiber and Belinda Darlene Zetterower, both 14, were last seen on June 18, 1975, leaving Schreiber's home in Hollywood to spend the night at a friend's house. The following morning, a family on a fishing trip discovered their bodies lying side by side along the canal parallel to Highway 27, approximately four miles north of Andytown, Florida. They were shot to death and fully clothed; there was no conclusive evidence that they were sexually assaulted.
- 14-year-old Robin Leslie Losch was found dead on July 10, 1975, by a family vacationing from Fort Myers who spotted an arm sticking out of the Highway 27 canal, about half a mile from where Schreiber and Zetterower's bodies were found. She was reported missing by her parents two days earlier when she failed to return home from summer classes at Stranahan High School. She had drowned and unlike most other victims, she was found fully clothed.
- 27-year-old respiratory therapist Ronnie Sue Gorlin went missing on July 22, 1975, after leaving her Miami Beach apartment to visit her mother at Parkway Hospital. The next day, her naked body was found in the Graham Canal, with signs that she had been sexually assaulted and then stabbed to death. Her car, a rented burgundy-white Oldsmobile Cutlass, was found in a shopping center parking lot with a slashed tire.
- Eight days later on July 30, 1975, 21-year-old Elyse Rapp, originally from New York City, left her apartment to go shopping, and was last seen at a Hollywood mall that evening. Her rented yellow Chevrolet Vega was found in the mall's parking lot with a deflated tire. The day after, Rapp's body was found in the same canal where Gorlin's body was found earlier. A forensic autopsy determined that Rapp's cause of death was drowning, but she had been sexually assaulted prior to her death.
- 15-year-old Mary Coppolla and 27-year-old Marlene Annabelli, arrived in Fort Lauderdale from Pennsylvania on October 17, 1975, renting a room for a one-week stay at the Lauderdale Beach Club. Their bodies, strangled with a rope, were found by a motorcyclist nine days later in a dump outside the city.
- The body of 17-year-old Michelle Winters was found floating in the Snapper Creek in Pembroke Pines on January 11, 1976. She was last seen in early January in Fort Lauderdale, with friends of the deceased claiming that she had been depressed and planned to enlist in the Navy. Winters' mother told police that her daughter had likely voluntarily entered her killer's car, as she often preferred to hitchhike.

== Suspects ==
In August 2023, the Broward County Sheriff's office announced that they identified a known felon as a suspect by using DNA collected from the clothing of two of the victims, Barbara Schreiber and Darlene Zetterower. The man's name was Robert Clark Keebler, who died in 2019. Authorities at the time suspected that he had an accomplice, who initially remained unknown. In May 2025, the Sheriff's Office announced that the second suspect was identified as Lawrence Stein, another felon who died in 2005. In conjunction with this, Deputy Andrew Gianino stated that he personally believes that these crimes are unrelated to the remaining cases.

== See also ==
- List of fugitives from justice who disappeared
- List of serial killers in the United States

== Bibliography ==
- Michael Newton (2009). The Encyclopedia of Unsolved Crimes. Infobase Publishing. p. 121. ISBN 978-1-4381-1914-4.
- Michael P. Burns (2021). The Flat Tire Murders: Unsolved Crimes of a South Florida Serial Killer. McFarland & Company. ISBN 9781476645223.
