= Protasovo =

Protasovo Протасово
- Village
- Location within Altai Krai Location within Russia
- Coordinates: 53°25′N 79°10′E
- Country: Russia
- Region: Altai Krai
- District: Nemetsky National District
- Time zone: UTC+7:00

Protasovo (Russian: Протасово) is a rural locality (a selo) and the administrative center of Protasovo Selsoviet of Nemetsky National District, Altai Krai, Russia. The population was 1174 as of 2016. There are 6 streets.

== Geography ==
Protasovo is located within the Kulunda Plain, 36 km north of Galbshtadt (the district's administrative centre) by road. Polevoye is the nearest rural locality.

== Ethnicity ==
The village is inhabited by Russians and Germans.
