= Roaring Mountain =

Mountain in Yellowstone National Park in the United States

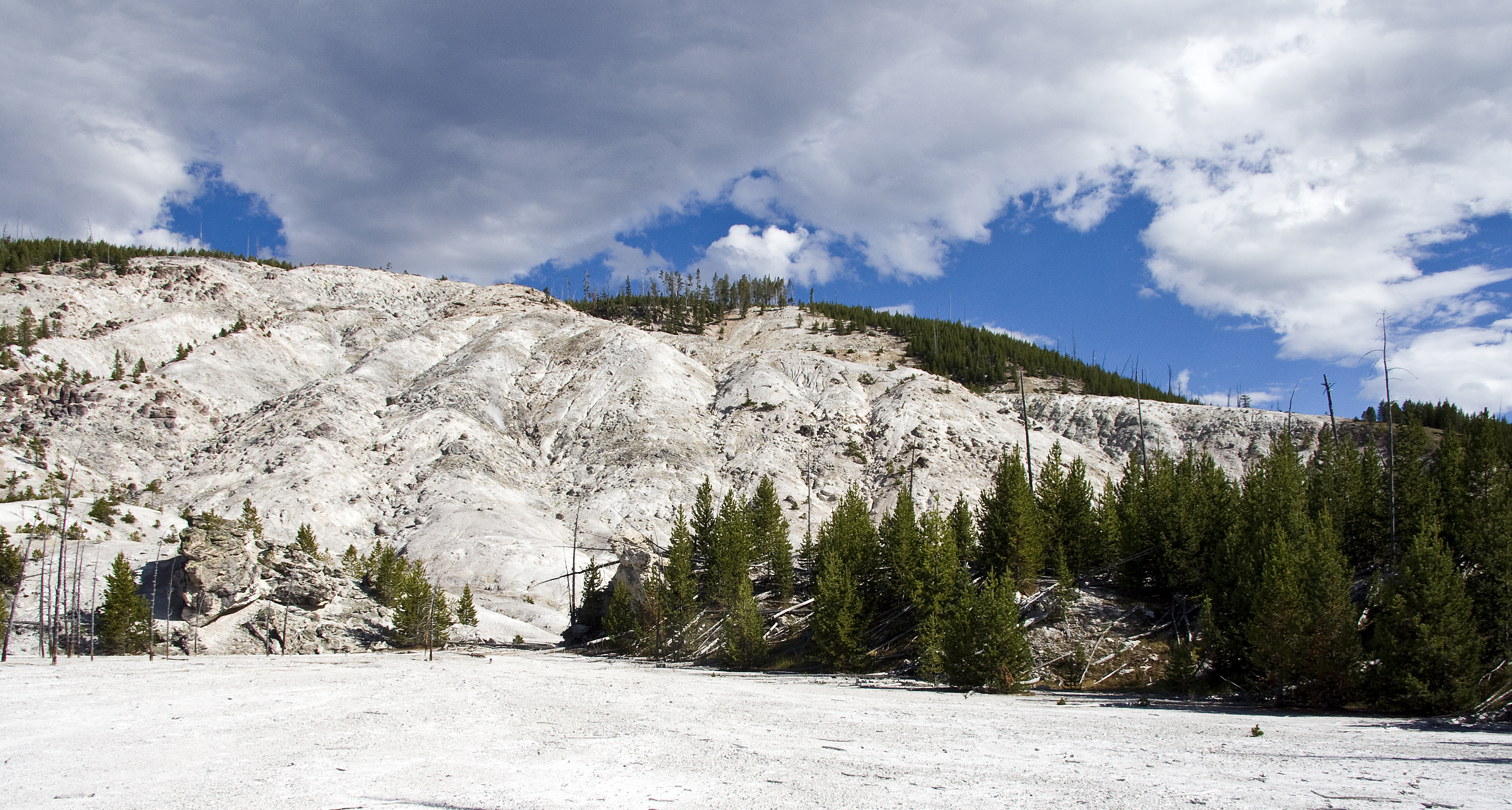
- Roaring Mountain in 2010

Highest point
- Elevation: 8,152 ft (2,485 m)
- Coordinates: 44°46′38″N 110°43′39″W

Geography
- Location within Wyoming
- Location: Teton County, Wyoming, U.S.
- Parent range: Yellowstone Plateau
- Topo map(s): USGS Obsidian Cliff, WY

Climbing
- Easiest route: hike

Roaring Mountain (8,152 feet (2,485 m)) is in Yellowstone National Park in the U.S. state of Wyoming. Roaring Mountain was named for the numerous fumaroles on the western slope of the peak which during the early 1900s were loud enough to be heard for several miles. Roaring Mountain is 5 miles (8.0 km) north of Norris Geyser Basin and south of Obsidian Cliff and is easily seen from park roads.

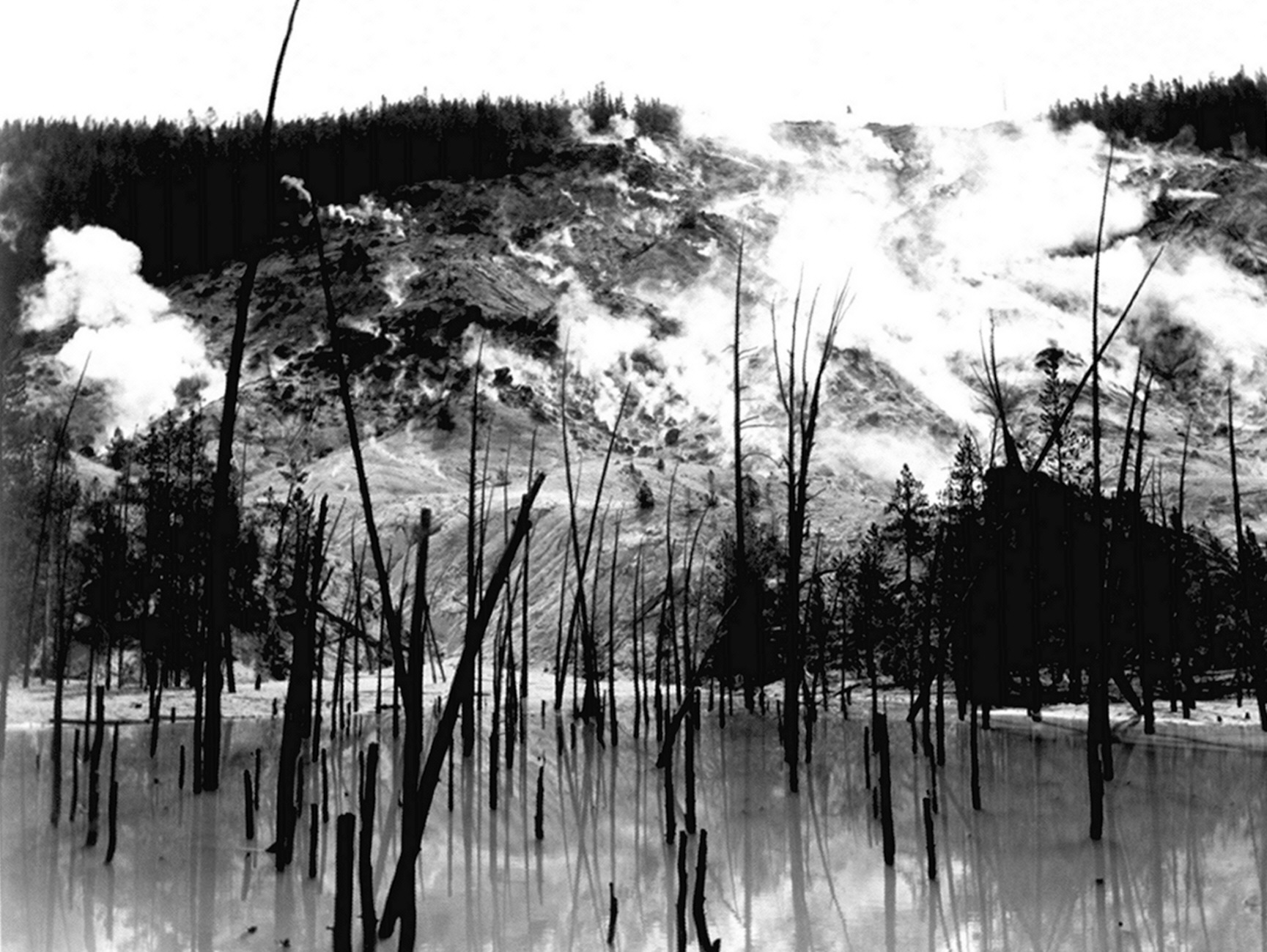
Roaring Mountain displaying significant fumarole activity in this image by Ansel Adams taken in 1942
