= Timeline of the Irish Civil War =

This is a timeline of the Irish Civil War, which took place between June 1922 and May 1923. It followed the Irish War of Independence (1919–1921), and accompanied the establishment of the Irish Free State as an entity independent from the United Kingdom of Great Britain and Ireland.

The conflict was waged between two opposing groups of Irish nationalists: the forces of the new Irish Free State, who supported the Anglo-Irish Treaty under which the state was established, and the republican opposition, for whom the Treaty represented a betrayal of the Irish Republic.

The government of the Irish Free State (established as a provisional government in January 1922 and as a full government in December 1922) was ultimately victorious. The anti-Treaty forces called a ceasefire in April 1923 and ordered their men to "dump arms" in May 1923.

The war involved both conventional warfare (late June–August 1922) when the Free State forces took the major towns and cities, and then a longer period of guerrilla warfare (September 1922 – April 1923) as the anti-Treaty forces were gradually brought to a standstill.

== Build up ==
=== January 1922 ===
- 7 January – The Anglo-Irish Treaty is passed in the Dáil (Parliament of the Irish Republic) by 64 votes to 57.
- 14 January – A Provisional Government is set up to administer the handover from British rule to the new Irish Free State. The Cabinet is almost the same as that of the Irish Republic, with the exception of Éamon de Valera, Cathal Brugha and Austin Stack, who resign over the acceptance of the Treaty.

=== February 1922 ===
- 18 February – An Anti-Treaty IRA unit under Ernie O'Malley seizes an RIC barracks in Clonmel, taking 40 policemen prisoner and capturing 600 rifles and thousands of rounds of ammunition.
- Anti-Treaty IRA leader Séumas Robinson closes down The Nationalist newspaper (Clonmel) over its support for the Treaty. Rory O'Connor has the Freeman's Journal closed down for the same reason.

=== March 1922 ===
- A stand-off occurs in Limerick between 700 pro-treaty IRA men under Michael Brennan and 800 Anti-Treaty IRA fighters under Ernie O'Malley over who will take over the military barracks, which were being abandoned by British troops. After negotiations between the mayor of Limerick, Stephen M. O'Mara, Anti-Treaty leader Liam Lynch and Pro-Treaty leader Richard Mulcahy, fighting is averted. On 12 March, it is decided that troops from outside Limerick will return to their own areas and that Limerick IRA men would divide the two military garrisons there between pro- and Anti-Treaty units. Limerick Corporation will oversee the maintenance of the RIC barracks.
- More confrontations result over the occupation of former British garrisons at Birr, Renmore and Templemore.
- 17 March - IRA leaders meet in Dublin and set up a temporary council with Liam Lynch as chief of staff.
- 26 March – 200 IRA delegates meet in an "Army Convention" and vote to repudiate the Treaty. They also reject the authority of the Dáil to accept the Treaty and set up their own 16-man "Army Executive".

See also IRA and the Anglo-Irish Treaty

- 29 March – Anti-Treaty IRA units in Cork under Sean Hegarty raid the British tug Upnor at sea. They take between 400 and 1,500 rifles, 60 machine guns, 700 handguns and over 25,000 rounds of ammunition, which they then distribute to Anti-Treaty IRA units.
- The Provisional Government's newly formed National Army takes over the British barracks at Beggar's Bush in Dublin.

=== April 1922 ===
- 1 April – Belfast Police Constable George Turner shot and killed; in retaliation five men shot and killed and six children wounded of whom one died of wounds in Sinn Féin area of Belfast.
- 10 April – Lieutenant Michael Sweeney, aged 21 years, 4th Battalion, Dublin Brigade of the Anti-Treaty IRA was killed by Free State troops at the junction of Grafton St and Nassau Street, Dublin while being transported under armed guard in a military lorry. Sweeney, who had previously been injured in his left leg by a landmine explosion stood up to hang onto the overhead bars in order to stretch the aforementioned leg. One of the escorts stepped forward and shot him in the back of the neck. Sweeney was taken to Jervis St Hospital where he died ten minutes after arrival. The seventeen year old soldier who shot him later testified that was trying to escape. An inquest ruled that death was accidental.
- 14 April – Rory O'Connor, Mellows and others lead 200 Anti-Treatyites in taking over the Four Courts and several other public buildings around Dublin in a show of defiance calculated to provoke a response by the British troops still stationed in Dublin.
- 20 April – There is 'intense firing' for two hours, starting at midnight, by Anti-Treaty fighters on the Pro-Treaty troops in Dublin stationed at the Provisional Government headquarters in Merrion Square, the Bank of Ireland on College Green, the telephone exchange and City Hall, Dublin. Three people are wounded. The Four Courts Anti-Treaty garrison denies knowledge of the attack.
- 25 April – A National Army brigadier-general, George Adamson, is shot dead in suspicious circumstances in Athlone.
- 27 April – The week after an abortive attempt by the anti-Treaty IRA to occupy the military barracks in Mullingar, two men – National Army adjutant Patrick Columb and anti-Treaty republican Joe Leavy – die in clashes in the town.
- 30 April – In Westport, County Mayo, four Pro-Treaty troops are arrested by Anti-Treaty Irregulars. They are taken to Castlebar and charged by a Republican Court of illegal recruitment. The men refuse to recognize the court. The men are threatened with execution if they continue to recruit for the Pro-Treaty forces.

=== May 1922 ===
- 2 May – Around 300 Irregulars take over the centre of Kilkenny, including the city hall, the Protestant cathedral and Kilkenny Castle. The Irregulars order the closure of the Ulster bank branch. The Provisional government hold the Military Barracks, the Jail and the Bank of Ireland. The Provision government sends 200 troops by train from Dublin to dislodge them. Fighting breaks out when the troops from Dublin arrive and there are up to 18 casualties. A truce is then brokered whereby both sides garrison different posts in the town.
- 3 May – Pro- and Anti-Treaty leaders announce a "truce" in the Dáil to try to prevent civil war.
- 4 May – Pro- and Anti-Treaty IRA forces clash in County Donegal. There is firefight at Buncrana. Around 16 Irregulars enter the town in order to rob the Hibernian Bank. Free state regulars learn about the attack and confront the raiders. Two Irregulars are killed and two are wounded. There are five civilians hit in the crossfire. One of which was a nine-year-old girl who later died in hospital. A nineteen-year-old woman also died later in hospital. Reports of the fighting are relayed to Ballybofey, which is the local headquarters of the Free State forces. When reinforcements travel through Newtowncunningham, they are ambushed. Three Free Staters are killed and three are seriously wounded.
- 5 May – Irregulars raid the Bank of Ireland branch in Westport and take £2,673. They leave a document indicating that the Provisional Government had refused to finance them and that they were taking the money to cover expenses. There are similar robberies in Waterford, Clonmel, Ballinrobe, Claremorris, Ballina and Sligo. In total, around £100,000 is seized from the Bank of Ireland.
- At Newtowncunningham, County Donegal, a Free State motor convoy is ambushed by Republicans, one Pro-treaty soldier is killed outright and four fatally wounded.
- 20 May – Michael Collins and Éamon de Valera sign a Pact, in which the pro- and Anti-Treaty wings of Sinn Féin would jointly contest the upcoming first election of the new state.
- There is a firefight at Gormanston railway station, County Meath, between RIC men and Anti-Treaty fighters. One Anti-Treaty officer and one RIC man are killed.

=== June 1922 ===
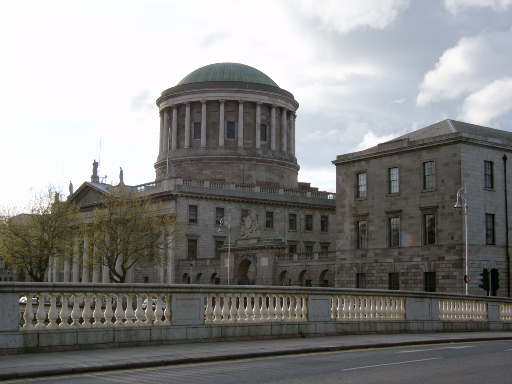
The Four Courts, occupied by Anti-Treaty forces in April and scene of the start of the civil war in June

- 14 June - Michael Collins urges voters to vote "for the candidates they think best of" in Cork.
- 16 June – A Free State soldier, William Murphy, is killed.
- 16 June – 1922 Irish general election – The Pro-Treaty Sinn Féin party wins the election, despite the Collins/De Valera Pact stating the election was not to be held on the issue of the Treaty but to form a Coalition Government, with 239,193 votes to 133,864 for Anti-Treaty Sinn Féin. A further 247,226 people voted for other parties, all of whom supported the Treaty (except Unionist Party)
- 18 June – At the Third Army Convention, a proposal by Tom Barry for war to be restarted with the British is narrowly defeated in the face of opposition by Liam Lynch. A hardline faction walks out and establishes a new GHQ command in the Four Courts. Joe McKelvey becomes IRA chief of staff.
- 22 June – Assassination in London of Henry Hughes Wilson by IRA men in retaliation for attacks on Catholics in Northern Ireland. Research will eventually come to suggest that it was Pro-Treaty leader Michael Collins who ordered the killing, but at the time, Winston Churchill assumes that the Anti-Treaty Four Courts garrison is responsible and warns Collins that if he does not act, British troops will be used to re-take Dublin. The assassins are hanged by the British on 10 August.
- 26 June – The Four Courts garrison kidnaps Free State General JJ "Ginger" O'Connell in retaliation for the arrest of Leo Henderson I/C Belfast Boycott.
- 27 June – Collins gives a final ultimatum to the Four Courts garrison to surrender before they are attacked.
- 28 June –
  - Michael Collins borrows two British 18-pounder field guns to bombard the Four Courts at 4.15 am, marking the definitive start of the Civil War.
  - Passenger trains to Galway, Westport, Ballina and Sligo are suspended.
  - A number of buildings in Ballina, including the post office, are seized by Irregulars.

== Hostilities ==
- 28 June–5 July – Battle of Dublin
- Fighting breaks out in Drogheda between pro- and Anti-Treaty units. One man on either side and a woman civilian are killed in a gun battle in the town. Many other civilians including the town's mayor are wounded. The Republicans are left in control of the town. The Anti-Treaty fighters blow up the railway bridge to the south of Drogheda, isolating it from Dublin.
- An Anti-Treaty fighter is killed in fighting Tipperary town.
- 29 June – British give Collins two more 18-pounders to increase the bombardment of the Four Courts. Free State troops storm the eastern buildings of the complex, losing 3 dead and 14 wounded.
- Oscar Traynor leads Anti-Treaty members of the IRA's 1st Dublin Brigade to occupy O'Connell Street in order to help the Four Courts garrison. His men also take up positions in York Street, South Circular Road, Capel Street, Parnell Square and Dolphin's Barn.
- Skirmish in Listowel, County Kerry, Free State troops surrender their arms to Republicans.
- Free State troops surround republican fighters at Finner Camp, County Donegal. After a two-hour gun battle, two anti-Treatyites are killed and 50 surrender. Elsewhere in the county, another 200 republicans are taken prisoner.
- 30 June – Anti-Treaty commander in the Four Courts, Paddy O'Brien is wounded by shrapnel. Ernie O'Malley assumes command. In the morning there is a truce to remove the wounded. Shortly afterwards, a massive explosion destroys the western wing of the Four Courts and the Irish Public Records Office along with it. It is thought to have been caused when fires from the artillery bombardment set off munitions stored there, although Free State troops claim that the building was mined. 20 Free State soldiers are maimed in the blast. O'Malley surrenders the Four Courts when Oscar Traynor sends word that he cannot break through to help them. Members of the IRA Army Executive Liam Mellows, Rory O'Connor, Joe McKelvey and Dick Barret are among the prisoners, but O'Malley himself escapes.
- A Free State column under Commandant General Sweeney breaks up Anti-Treaty units in County Donegal. There are fire fights at Letterkenny, Buncrana and Bundoran. Casualties are reported, including at least one irregular killed and 200 taken prisoner.
- Anti-Treaty IRA fighters fire on National Army billets in Tralee, killing one soldier.

=== July 1922 ===
- 1 July –
  - Free State troops take Republican outposts in the south of Dublin city and throw a cordon around their concentration on O'Connell street.Republican outposts at the Swan Hotel on Aungier Street and at Harcourt Road and Adelaide Road are cleared by National Army troops equipped with armoured cars and artillery. About 400 Anti-Treaty prisoners are taken in the operation.
  - In County Donegal, the National Army commandeer a train from Buncrana and move northward. Clonmany is captured without incident. Troops then move onto Carndonagh, where Irregulars occupy the workhouse. A gun battle breaks out. After one hour, the National Army open fire with a machine gun and the Irregulars surrender.
- Anti-Treaty IRA in County Sligo ambush National Army troops at Carrigarat.
- 2 July – In Dublin, the Republican garrison of thirty men in Moran's hotel on the corner of Gardiner street and Talbot street surrender after being shelled at close range by artillery.
- Fighting breaks out in Boyle, County Roscommon, when Republicans attack Free State held buildings. Casualties include National Army officer Michael Dockery. Fighting continues in Boyle for three more days.
- The Free State garrison in Ballyjamesduff barracks in County Cavan is attacked with rifle fire and grenades. There are no casualties. Barracks are also attacked at Ballyshannon and Cordonoagh and troops' arms are taken by anti-Treaty fighters.
- 3 July – Free State soldiers take the side streets around O'Connell street in Dublin, isolating the Republican held buildings there. They also detonate a bomb under the YMCA building held by Republicans, leaving just Oscar Traynor and a little over 100 men holding out in a "Block" of buildings at the northeastern corner of O'Connell street. Traynor evacuates most of his men, leaving just 15 in the "block" under Cathal Brugha. Casualties so far in Dublin are reported as 49 killed and 178 wounded, including combatants, civilians and one British soldier. 400 Republicans are reported taken prisoner
- A National Army officer is shot dead in Nenagh, County Tipperary, causing the Free State troops to attack Republican held positions in the town. The Republicans retreat, burning the barracks they were holding.
- 4 July – Frank Aiken, writes to Richard Mulcahy stating the Fourth Northern Division of the IRA would stay neutral, called for an end to the fighting and for the removal of the Oath of Allegiance (Ireland) from the Free State Constitution.
- In Dublin, Free State troops bring up a field gun to Henry street, within 100 metres of the remaining republican held positions to fire on them at point blank range. Incendiary bombs are also thrown into the "block", which is set ablaze.
- Ernie O'Malley and 250 Anti-Treaty fighters take Enniscorthy in County Wexford after some fighting. They take the Free State garrison there captive but release them on condition that they do not fight again against Republicans. Seán Moylan and 230 republican troops occupy New Ross.
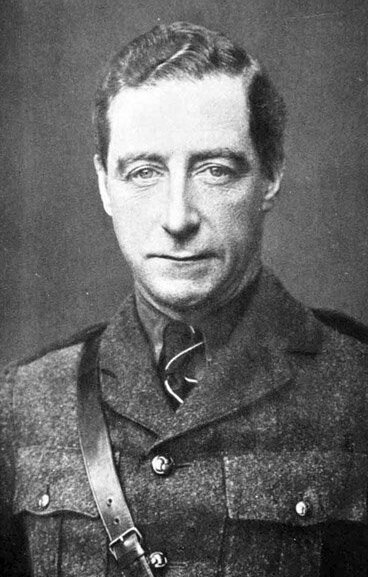
  Cathal Brugha, Republican leader killed on 5 July 1922 in Dublin
- A large Free State force takes Drogheda, County Louth. The republicans are based in Millmount Fort, which overlooks the town and also hold the railway station. National Army troops bring up mortars and 18-pounder guns to shell them. After several hours of bombardment, the Anti-Treaty fighters surrender. There is also some fighting at the railway station in the town, which again ends in the surrender of the republicans.
- Free State troops from the Curragh attack the Republican post at Ballymore Eustace, County Kildare but are beaten off with 3 killed and 8 wounded.
- 5 July – End of the fighting in Dublin The remainder of Oscar Traynor's Anti-Treaty force in O'Connell street either slips away or surrenders. Republican leader Cathal Brugha is killed outside the Hamman hotel. Anti-Treaty Dublin forces re-group in Blessington.
- The fighting in Dublin has cost sixty-five combatants killed, of whom 16 are government troops and 49 are Anti-Treaty IRA men, and 280 wounded of whom 122 are Free State soldiers and 158 are Republicans. The civilian casualties are thought to comprise over 250 killed and injured.
- Republicans abandon Boyle, County Roscommon when Seán Mac Eoin arrives with Free State troops and an 18-pounder gun.
- A battle takes place in Abbeyleix, County Laois. Vol. Christopher McGlynn of the Free State army is killed by a sniper's bullet.
- A firefight takes place between 200 Free State troops and 30 Anti-Treaty fighters at Curraghtown, County Meath. One man on either side is killed before a priest arranges a truce and the republicans surrender. They are held in Trim and Dundalk gaols.
- 6 July –
  - A Free State expeditionary force is sent to County Wexford to re-take the towns there. It comprises 230 men under Colonel Commandant Keogh, with one field gun and four armoured vehicles.
  - Two Anti-Treaty fighters are killed in a skirmish outside a pub in Urlingford.
- 7 July –
  - Free State troops move south from Dublin and break up the Anti-Treaty concentration at Blessington. They take 60 republican prisoners at Brittas and 13 more at Ballymore Eustace. Oscar Traynor and the main Anti-Treaty force from Dublin abandons Blessington. In exchanges of fire, one man on either side is killed and two Free State troops are wounded.
  - National Army troops beat off an attack on Lifford Barracks, County Donegal. Two National Army soldiers are wounded. Irregular casualties are unknown.
- Pro-Treaty forces take Galway, with minimal resistance. One Anti-Treaty IRA captain, Donnellan is killed, five of his men are wounded and 12 captured before Free State troops secure the area. The remaining republican fighters set fire to a number of public buildings before fleeing the city. The National Army takes two killed and more wounded in the operation.
- 8 July – The Republicans in Wexford abandon Enniscorthy and New Ross.
- 9 July – the Free State barracks in Bailieboro, County Cavan is attacked and taken, the arms of its garrison are seized. An anti-Treaty prisoner, Edward Boylans is shot dead in Cavan barracks as he tries to escape.
- 11 July – Fighting breaks out in Limerick between Pro- and Anti-Treaty factions. National Army troops open fire on the Republicans holding the Ordnance Barracks.
- Two Free State soldiers are killed and three wounded in an ambush at Drumkeen, County Donegal.
- 12–13 July – Republicans are taken prisoner in fighting in Limerick city.
- Anti-Treaty forces capture 47 Free State troops in east County Limerick.
- Free State troops secure Maryborough after a four-hour gun battle. Three Anti-Treatyites are killed and two Free State soldiers wounded.
- 13 July – Republicans take the Free State outpost, the Munster Tavern, in Limerick, but are driven back by armoured cars.
- Anti-Treaty IRA Mayo unit ambushes Pro-Treaty men at Rockwood, County Sligo, killing five, wounding four and capturing two armoured cars. They then occupy Collooney.
- One Free State soldier is killed and one fatally wounded in an ambush in Stranarlor, County Donegal.
- A Free State column of 16 is ambushed, taken prisoner and disarmed in County Clare.
- 14 July – Seán Mac Eoin and 400 Free State troops re-take Collooney, after an artillery bombardment and protracted fire-fight, taking 74 Republican prisoners. Only one man is killed, however, an Anti-Treaty IRA fighter.
- 15 July – National Army troops assault Republican-held Strand Barracks and King John's Castle in Limerick, with armoured cars, grenades, machine gun and mortar fire, but fail to take them. Six Free State troops are killed and five wounded. One Republican is killed and five wounded.
- A skirmish takes place in Kiltimagh, County Mayo. Anti-Treaty fighters attempt to kidnap T. Ruane, chairman of the Swinford District Council, but a fire-fight breaks out in which Ruane, an Anti-Treaty officer and Free State officer are fatally wounded.
- National Army troops surround and take Cappard House, County Laois where the local Anti-Treaty forces were billeted. Five Republicans are reported killed.
- A Free State soldier is killed in an ambush at Gort, County Galway.
- Free State troops, equipped with an 18-pounder gun, shell the republican camp at Lough Inch, County Donegal. They surrender after two days, with 30 taken prisoner.
- 16 July – Free State troops take Frank Aiken, who was previously neutral, along with 3–400 of his men from the Fourth Northern Division of the Irish Republican Army, prisoner in Dundalk. Two of Aiken's men are killed.
- 17 July – Free State general Eoin O'Duffy arrives in Limerick with 1,500 National Army troops, four armoured cars and one 18-pounder field gun.
- Two Anti-Treaty fighters are killed in two separate ambushes in County Kildare.
- In Galway, the funeral of a soldier killed on the 15th is fired on by Republicans, a battalion commandant, Rooney, is killed.
- 18 July –
  - Due to the occupation of Westport by Irregulars, supplies begin to run out. The flour and oatmeal supply is exhausted and stores are empty. There is considerable unemployment due to the closure of the port and local bacon factory. Post Office workers in Westport and Castlebar are refusing to go to work. As a consequence, Pensions are not being distributed.
  - Free State general John T. Prout arrives in Waterford with 700 troops, one artillery piece and four armoured cars to take the city. His second in command is deposed East Waterford Brigade Commandant Paddy Paul. The Anti-Treaty IRA garrison consists of 200–300 men under George Lennon, Flying Column Leader. The combined Waterford Brigade is under the overall command of Pax Whelan. Prout sets up his gun on Mount Misery (Mercy) and bombards Republican held positions along the River Suir in the city, forcing them to eventually evacuate the military barracks and the post office. The barracks are burnt down by Irregulars before they abandoned the city. Four deaths occurred during the fighting, one of which was a girl of ten, who was shot in the stomach.
- 19 July – An eight-man Free State foot patrol is ambushed at Ballinasloe, County Galway; one soldier is killed.
- 20 July –
  - Fall of Limerick. Free State forces capture the Ordnance Barracks and Castle Barracks in Limerick. The Republicans burn the remaining two barracks they are holding and retreat southwards. Fighting in Limerick has cost the lives of six Free State soldiers and 12 civilians, with a further 87 wounded. The press reports about thirty Anti-Treaty IRA men killed but a recent study puts their fatalities at just five.
  - Fall of Waterford. Captain Ned O'Brien leads 100 National Army troops in boats in an attack on the quays in Waterford, taking 12 prisoners. Free State troops then cross the river Suir into the city. General Prout brings their field gun down to the Suir Ferry bank to fire at close range into the Anti-Treaty-held Post Office, which then surrenders. The Republicans abandon Ballybricken Prison on Friday afternoon, 21 July escaping to Mt. Congreve in Kilmeadan, the Comeraghs and eventually, Dungarvan where many men of the Flying Column give up the struggle. Lennon resigns 1 August in a letter to First Division O/C Liam Deasy, citing disagreements over "tactics employed by our side". Two Free State soldiers have been killed in the fighting in Waterford and 19 wounded. At least one Anti-Treaty fighter is fatally wounded. Five civilians are also killed.
- Sir James Craig, prime minister of Northern Ireland, issues a statement endorsing Michael Collins' efforts to bring "peace and order to the South and West".
- Castlebar District Council issues a resolution condemning the Free State Provisional government for inaugurating the war in Ireland.
- 23 July – Free State troops under General W.R.E. Murphy take Bruff and Kilmallock in County Limerick. See Battle of Kilmallock.
- In County Mayo, IRA Irregulars abandon the former Black and Tans Barracks in Ballina. As they leave, they set fire to the building. The Irregulars also destroy all the telegraph equipment in the Post office and the telephone equipment in the railway station. After they leave Ballina, the Irregulars destroy the bridges at Pootoon and Shanaghy. They also dug trenches into the roads surrounding Ballina in order to prevent vehicle traffic entering the town.
- 24 July – Republican fighters under Liam Deasy re-take Bruff and take 76 Free State prisoners.
- Naval landing of 400 Free State troops in Westport. As the troops arrive on the quay, Irregulars abandon the R.I.C. barracks in the town.
- 24 July –
  - The police barracks in Newport are burned by Irregulars, who had held the building since the beginning of the Truce.
  - In Charlestown, County Mayo, Irregulars execute one of their own men for disobeying an order to destroy local property. As a result of the execution, some Irregulars from Charlestown and Swinford mutiny and return home.
- Anti-Treaty IRA fighters ambush a prison train Killurin, County Wexford, freeing its prisoners; two Free State soldiers are killed and 7 wounded.
- Two civilians are shot dead in Dublin when Irregulars rob a public house.
- Two girl civilians are shot dead another man critically wounded by Northern Ireland forces along the border with the Free State, near Newry. They had failed to stop when challenged.
- Two Free State soldiers are killed in Galway, when the car they were driving crashes into a tree laid across the road.
- 25 July –
  - Republican fighters attack a lorry full of Free State troops at York Street, central Dublin with small arms and grenades. Six civilians are wounded and two men are arrested. In a separate incident, a Free State soldier is killed in an accidental shooting at Beggar's Bush barracks.
  - In County Mayo, National Army Troops advance from Claremorris to Castlebar. By the evening, 150 troops occupy the town, equipped with armoured cars and artillery. The town is captured without a fight. However, the Courthouse, Barracks and Jail are all burned by Irregulars prior to the arrival of Free State Forces. The National Army followed up with raids on the houses of known Irregulars living in Castlebar. Five Irregulars were arrested. A contingent of Irregulars retreat to Ballinrobe.
- The County Mayo towns of Ballyhaunis and Balla are captured without incident. The townspeople of Ballyhaunis disarm one of the Irregulars and turn out in their hundreds to greet the National Army troops entering the town.
- 26 July – Free State troops, 350 men under Jerry Ryan, take Golden, County Tipperary.
- 27 July –
  - A contingent of the Dublin Brigade advance from Castlebar to Ballina. There is an exchange of fire before the Irregulars abandon the town. National Army troops occupy the workhouse, which is transformed into a makeshift barracks.
  - The Providence Wollen Mills in Foxford, County Mayo are closed, rendering 300 men and women unemployed.
  - Anti-Treaty IRA under Padraig Quinn attack Dundalk and dynamite the prison wall and in fifteen minutes the well-timed operation results in the freeing of 106 Republican prisoners, including Frank Aiken. In an ambush at nearby Castletown Cross, two Free State soldiers are wounded, one fatally.
  - The Marconi radio station in Westport is burnt by Irregulars.
  - Irregulars end their three-week occupation of Ballaghaderreen, County Roscommon. Before they left, they burnt down the local barracks and destroyed the bridges surrounding the town. At one point, up to 200 Irregulars occupied the town, forcibly procuring supplies from the townspeople.
- Two Free State soldiers are killed in ambushes in Galway.
- Oscar Traynor, commander of the Anti-Treaty IRA's Dublin Brigade, is arrested by Free State troops in Dublin.
- Three National Army soldiers were killed in fighting near Kilmallock. Republican casualties were not reported.
- 28 July –
  - Ambush of National Army troops by Anti-Treaty IRA at Tonduff, Abbeyleix, on the main road to Maryborough, County Laois. A mine is exploded and fire is exchanged, Vol. Grace from Mountrath is killed while retrieving his rifle from the road. Brigadier Mick Gray is wounded. In the rounding up operation, 21 Republicans are taken prisoner but two Free State officers, Comdt. General Austin McCurtin and Comdt. Seán (Jack) Collison are killed on 4 August 1922.
  - The National Army in Dublin issue a statement reporting that Tuam, Newport and Westport are now under the control of the Free State. Over one hundred prisoners held by Irregulars have been released. The message also reported that in Glenties, County Donegal, an Irregular disguised as a priest had lured National Army troops into an ambush resulting in the deaths of two Free State volunteers.
- Two Free State soldiers are killed in an ambush on the road from Killorglin to Tralee in Kerry.
- 29 July –
  - About 400 Republicans attack Golden, County Tipperary, but fail to take it and two of their men are killed. Their armoured car is knocked out by artillery and the National Army takes 26 prisoners.
  - In County Mayo, Comdt-General Lawlor and Col.-Comdt Reynolds arrive in Ballina and they are greeted by enthusiastic crowds. Numerous arrests of Irregulars are made throughout Ballina.
- 30 July – Free State troops take Bruree, County Limerick. The Dublin Guard, supported by artillery, attacks the village for five hours before the Anti-Treaty IRA retreats. At least 13 Free State soldiers and nine Anti-Treaty fighters are killed in the action and more are wounded.
- Two Free State soldiers are killed in a skirmish in County Mayo.
- 30 July – Free State troops raid on a public house owned by Mrs Maria Dowling, Blackmill Street, Kilkenny. Samuel Oakes aged 17 was fatally wounded when shot by the military. Eleven young men were arrested at the scene.
- 31 July – Anti-Treaty activist Harry Boland is shot by Free State troops as he is being arrested in Skerries, near Dublin. He dies on 2 August.
- Free State troops under Paddy O'Connor attack Republican held Tipperary town. Fighting continues for two days, in which four Free State troops are killed and three wounded. Forty-four Republican prisoners are taken.
- Free State general Seán Mac Eoin reports to Michael Collins, "In the Midlands Divisions all posts and positions of military value are in our hands."
- Two Free State soldier are killed in an ambush at Sugnagillow, County Donegal.
- Late July – Anti-Treaty IRA in Dublin ambushes and destroys an armoured train in Inchicore.
- Anti-Treaty IRA in Raheen, County Limerick ambushes Free State troops – two Colonels killed; 2nd Lt Michael Joe Costello and another officer turn ambush which results in capture of 30 of ambushers. Costello is promoted by Michael Collins to Colonel-Commandant at the age of 18.
- Two Free State troops are killed in an ambush at Sugnagillow, County Donegal. Another two are killed near Newport, County Mayo.

=== August 1922 ===
- 1 August –
  - Seven irregulars are arrested in Ballina by the National Army.
  - In County Mayo, the Free State Authorities establish a volunteer Civilian Guard. The initiative is later expanded to other counties.
  - National Army troops advance through North Mayo via Lahardane. National Army troops are ambushed as they travel through Coolnabinna, at the foot of the Nephin Mountains. One National Army soldier is killed while two Irregulars are wounded. Part of the National army remains in Coolabinna and face a second attack. One of the irregulars is killed. The remaining National Army troops advance to Crossmolina, which is taken without a shot fired. The local population greet the arrival of National Army troops enthusiastically. After the National Army capture Crossmolina, a number of Irregulars are arrested. Thirty men from the town sign up for service in the National Army.
- 2 August – Naval Landing of Free State troops in County Kerry. Paddy Daly and the Dublin Guard, as well as others, a total of about 800, land at Fenit. They fight their way to Tralee at a cost of 9 killed and 35 wounded. Two Republican fighters are killed in the fighting and more are wounded. The remainder retreat.
- Republican forces under Liam Deasy attack Bruree, County Limerick with three armoured cars, trying to re-take it from the Free State troops but their attack is beaten off.
- Republicans abandon Tipperary town and retreat to Clonmel; it is then occupied by National Army troops under Paddy O'Connor.
- 2 August – Irregulars attack Swinford, County Mayo. Initially, the Irregulars capture the town, taking 40 National Army Troops. In the evening, National Army troops counter-attack and recapture the town. As they approach the town, the National Army army is ambushed and commandant Scally from Athlone is killed. A second National Army Soldier is also killed. After the National Army employ a machine gun against the insurgents, five irregulars surrendered. All the surrendering irregulars were residents of Foxford. The remaining irregulars flee back into the countryside. As they leave the town, the barracks and town hall are burned.
- Fighting around Carrick on Suir between 600 National Army troops under General Prout and 400 Republicans under Dan Breen.
- 3 August –

The Free State forces under General Prout take Carrick on Suir with one man killed and three wounded. Breen's men retreat southwards.

  - A party of irregulars attack a National Army position at St. Muredach's College, Ballina. During the ensuring gun battle, one National Army soldier is severely wounded. Irregulars also attack troops stationed at the Ballina Workhouse.
  - A contingent of 70 National Army troops enter Ballinrobe, County Mayo. The National Army recruit a further 200 volunteers.
- Around 250 pro-treaty IRA men from County Clare are embarked from Kilrush to Tarbert in fishing boats and take Ballylongford and Listowel.
- Pro-Treaty supporter under suspicion of being an informant is executed by Anti-Treaty Volunteers in Donoughmore, County Cork.
- 4 August –
  - Charlestown Public Hall, County Mayo, is burnt down.
  - Republican troops abandon Cashel, County Tipperary.
  - The National Army capture Tubbecurry, County Sligo. Three Irregulars are captured.
  - 150 Free State troops under Paddy Daly take Castleisland, County Kerry. The Republicans abandon their positions after six shrapnel shells are fired at them from an 18-pounder field gun.
- Three Free State soldiers, including two commandants, Collison and McCurtain, are killed in a mine and gun attack on a troop lorry in County Tipperary.
- 5 August – About 2,000 Free State troops under Eoin O'Duffy take Kilmallock, County Limerick. The Republicans retreat towards Charleville.

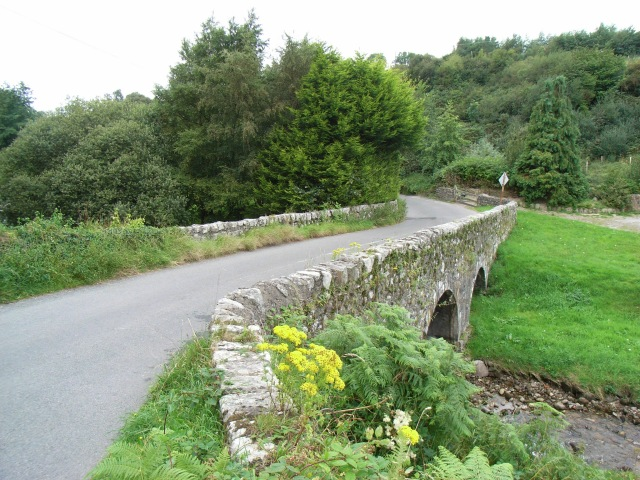
Glencullen Bridge

- Plot to Isolate Dublin Fails when Free State Intelligence officers discover from captured the Anti-Treaty officer Liam Clarke that Republicans have planned to destroy all the bridges leading into Dublin. In the ensuing manoeuvres
  - 31 Anti-Treaty Irregulars are captured at Glencullen Bridge.
  - Troops capture 104 Anti-Treaty fighters in the act in north County Dublin, including their officer Pat Sweeney, crippling the remnants of the Anti-Treaty IRA in Dublin.
- A National Army soldier is killed by a sniper at Tralee.
- 6 August –
  - In County Mayo, National Army troops leave Killala by sea and capture Enniscrone, County Sligo. Separately, a column of Troops leave Ballina and head to Enniscrone. The column is attacked and forced back to Ballina. They return with reinforcements, including an armoured car, and capture three Republicans. One is killed. After Enniscrone is captured, the National Army control the entire western coast from the River Moy down to Galway.
  - Anti-Treaty IRA fighters ambush a Free State provisions column at Knockeen crossroads in Kerry. One National Army officer is killed and several privates are wounded.
- 7 August –
  - Heavy fighting takes place at Newcastle West, County Limerick. Free State troops, advancing from Rathkeale, take the town with armoured cars and infantry supported by artillery. During the 12-hour battle, a party of Republicans is caught in machine gun fire from one of the Free State armoured cars, taking many casualties. The Republican headquarters is shelled by field guns and they eventually retreat along the Cork road. Press reports say that 12 Anti-Treaty fighters are killed in the action. National Army casualties are reported as, 'less than those of the irregulars.'
  - Joe Hudson, Glasthule, Dun Laoire is shot dead in his Garden at the same address by Free State Army officer.
- National Army troops assault and take Kildorrey, County Cork from its anti-Treaty garrison. Casualties are reported as one dead and 2 wounded on either side. 27 Republicans are taken prisoner.
- 8 August – Free State seaborne landings take place in County Cork. Emmet Dalton and 800 troops, with two artillery pieces and armoured cars, land at Passage West. A further 200 men are put ashore at Youghal and 180 troops land at Glandore. Heavy fighting takes place at Rochestown in Cork, as 200 Anti-Treaty troops try to block the Free State advance on Cork City. Nine National Army and seven Republicans are killed before the Free State troops secure the area.
- 9 August – There is fighting at Douglas, County Cork. The Free State troops take 36 Republican prisoners.
- A National Army soldier is killed in ambush at Ferrycarrig, County Wexford.
- General Prout's Free State column takes Redmondstown, County Kilkenny, with the aid of artillery.
- 10 August – The Republicans abandon Cork city and burn the barracks they had been holding, including Charles Fort. The National Army takes the city unopposed.
- General Prout's Free State troops take Clonmel.
- 11 August – Liam Lynch, the Anti-Treaty IRA's Chief of Staff, abandons Fermoy, the last major Republican held town. Lynch issues orders that Republican forces are to abandon the policy of holding towns, and orders them to form flying columns and pursue guerrilla warfare. End of the war's conventional phase.
- A Free State Naval landing takes place at Kenmare. Commandant Tom "Scarteen" O'Connor (formerly local IRA commander) lands unopposed with 200 pro-treaty men and occupies Rathmore and Millstreet. Kerry operations in August have cost the National Army a total of 11 killed and 114 wounded.
- 12 August – Free State President Arthur Griffith dies of a stroke. He is replaced by Michael Collins.
- 15 August – Free State troops take Clifden in County Galway without resistance. The Republicans abandon the town and burn the local radio transmitter station.
- 16 August – 300 men of the Anti-Treaty IRA 4th Northern Division under Frank Aiken attack Dundalk. They use two mines to breach the walls of the barracks and temporarily take over the town. Six Free State soldiers and one Commandant, Byrne, are killed in the attack. Fifteen more are wounded. Two Republicans are accidentally killed by one of their own mines and thirty wounded. About 240 Republican prisoners are freed from the prison and 400 rifles are taken. However, Aiken does not try to hold the town and, while in possession of it, calls for a truce in a meeting in the town square.
- 17 August – Free State troops under Dan Hogan re-occupy Dundalk unopposed. One civilian is killed in the operation.
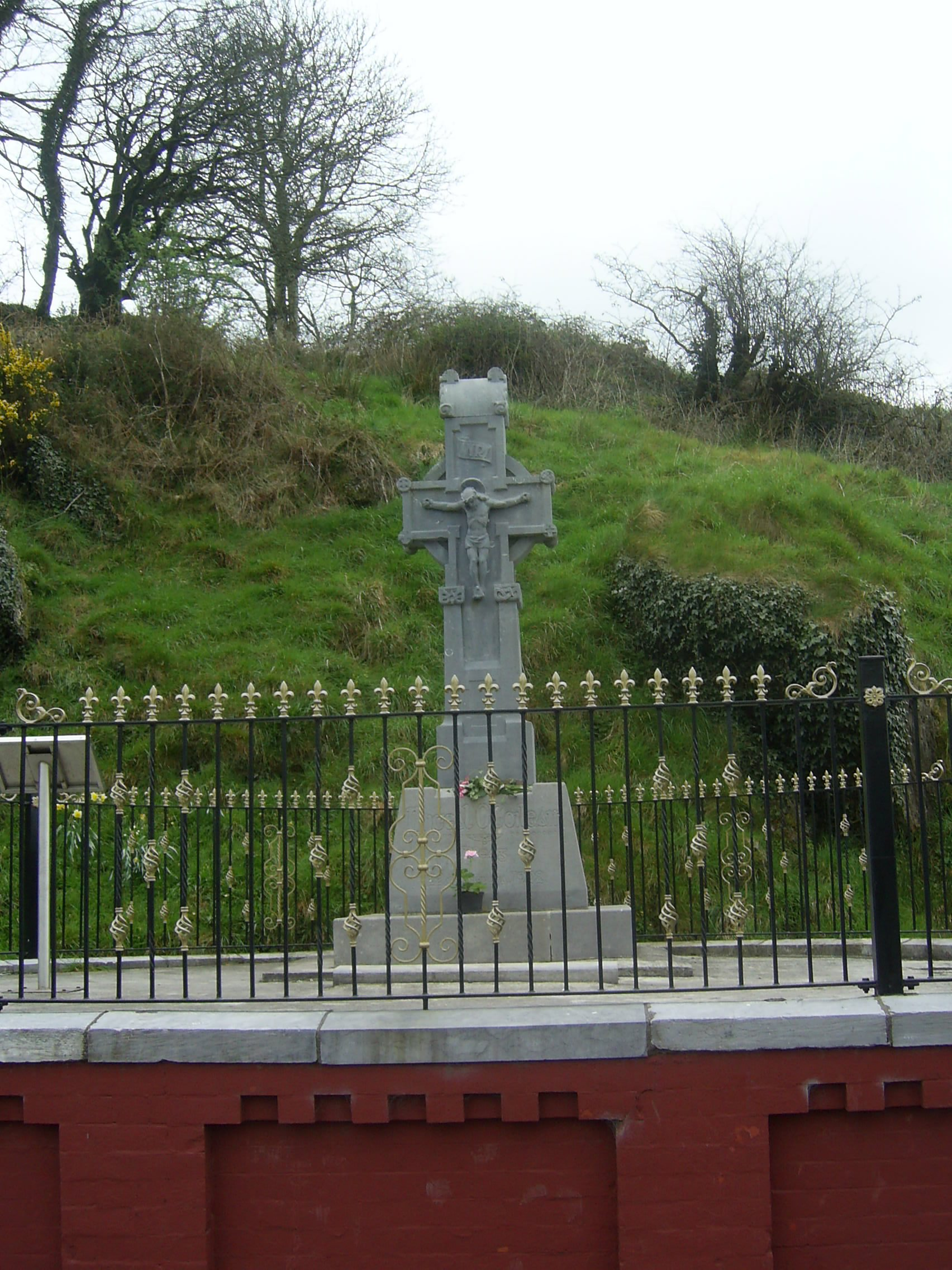
  The Cross on the bend in the road commemorating where Michael Collins, leader of the Irish Republican Army, was killed on 22 August 1922.
- Two unarmed National Army medics are shot dead by a sniper at Inisfallen, County Kerry.
- 18 August –
  - A lorry of Free State soldiers is ambushed between Clonmel and Cahir, County Tipperary. Three National Army troops are killed and seven wounded.
  - Anti-Treaty fighters attack the Free State barracks in Monaghan town. They are driven off after a half-hour gun battle. One National Army lieutenant is killed and three Republicans are wounded. The Republicans also raid the post office in the town, and shoot dead a postman. They get away with £900.
- Anti-Treaty IRA men attack a Free State patrol on Longford Street, Dublin, one civilian is killed and three more wounded.
- 19 August – There is a four-hour gun battle on the border near Dundalk between Free State soldiers and Anti-Treaty fighters. The Republicans eventually retreat across the border into Northern Ireland where they cannot be followed. Elsewhere, there are renewed attacks on Free State troops in Dublin and the railway bridge at Carrick on Shannon is blown up and destroyed by Republicans.
- In County Kerry, a Free State column is ambushed near Listowel, one soldier is shot dead.
- In County Tipperary, a National Army soldier is shot dead when visiting his family.
- 20 August – Seven Free State troops are ambushed in a car heading from Liscarrol to Kanturk, County Cork. One Free State officer is killed, two others wounded and the remainder surrendered with their arms.
- A lorry of Free State soldiers is ambushed at Blessington, County Wicklow. One soldier is killed and five are wounded.
- 21 August – One Free State soldier is killed in an ambush at Blessington, County Wicklow. Four more are wounded in an ambush near Enniscorthy, County Wexford. Free State troops occupy Bandon and Dunmanway, County Cork without resistance.
- 22 August – Two Free State soldiers are killed and three wounded in an ambush at Redmondstown, County Kilkenny on the road between Clonmel and Kilkenny. Free State commandant Frank Thornton is also badly wounded in the incident. Three other Free State officers had been captured by the irregulars in the same spot the previous night.
- A Free State soldier is killed in an ambush of a convoy near Tralee.
- 22 August – National Army Commander-in-Chief Michael Collins is killed in an ambush by Anti-Treaty Republicans at Béal na Bláth, near his family home in County Cork, he is the only fatality of the 45-minute fire fight. Richard Mulcahy takes over as Free State National Army commander in chief. Collins had been pursuing talks with Anti-Treaty leaders Dan Breen, Liam Deasy and others in order to try to stop the fighting. His killing greatly embittered the war and probably prolonged it by several months.
- The Criminal Investigation Department (CID), a police intelligence unit, is formed to 'be distinct from existing police forces with separate headquarters under direct control of the Minister for Home Affairs.' It was formed from members of the National Army and the Irish Republican Police and is based at Oriel House, Westland Row, Dublin. They consist initially of over 100 heavily armed men and later are 350 strong. Also thirty members of the Squad (a former IRA assassination unit) are established as the Protective Corps, also based at Oriel House, to afford protection to members of the Provisional Government. The Oriel House unit is effectively a counter-insurgency corps and is accused of the assassination of many Republicans during the conflict.
- A Free State soldier is killed in a raid on house at Kilcommin, County Kerry.
- 25 August – A Free State CID Motor Driver is fatally wounded in an attack at Dean's Grange, Dublin.
- A Free State soldier is shot dead and a barracks burned at Shortcourse, Waterford.
- 26 August – A Free State convoy of 100 troops is ambushed between Tralee and Killorglin, County Kerry. One officer is killed. The Free State troops are caught in several more ambushes along their line of retreat, taking more casualties.
- Anti-Treaty fighters ambush Free State troops at Glasson, near Athlone. National Army officer Lieutenant McCormack is killed and several more soldiers are wounded.
- Fianna Éireann members Seán Cole and Alf Colley and Anti-Treatyite Bernard Daly, are abducted and killed in Dublin by the CID based in Oriel House, allegedly in revenge for Michael Collins killing, although possibly in retaliation for the death of a CID man the previous day. Witnesses describe the detectives putting buckets over the boys' heads, and the boys crying out "But what is it for?"
- Two Free State soldiers are killed in an ambush on the road between Nenagh and Limerick.
- A civilian is killed in an exchange of fire at Whitefriars, Dublin city.
- 27 August – In County Tipperary, three Free State soldiers are killed in ambush near Nenagh, when a mine is exploded under their lorry and they were fired on by Republicans. Several more men are injured in the shooting. Another two are killed in a separate mine attack near Bushfield.
- Anti-Treaty units mount an ambush of Free State troops at Glenflesk, near Killarney, County Kerry. The Free State troops bring up an 18-pounder artillery piece and eventually drive off their attackers. Press reports say that the bodies of 20 Anti-Treaty fighters are found at the scene.
- A Free State soldier is shot dead in an ambush near Macroom, County Cork.
- Two Republicans are captured in Tralee and shot by Free State troops. One of them, James Healy, survives and escapes.
- 28 August – Five civilians are killed in Westport after Anti-Treaty IRA members open fire on a crowd leaving mass, held for the repose of the soul of Michael Collins. Free State troops returned fire.
- Free State troops assault an Anti-Treaty position at Convent hill, near Newport, County Mayo. They are repulsed with seven men wounded.
- 29 August – Six Free State soldiers are killed in three separate ambushes. Two in Tullamore, and one in Macroom, and two in an ambush and firefight between Kilrglin and Tralee in County Kerry. An attack is also made on Clonakilty in which one Free State officer is killed.
- Three Republican fighters are reported killed in fighting in Cork.
- In Marybourogh Jail, where 600 Anti-Treaty prisoners are being held, the Republicans riot and set fire to their cells.
- 30 August – Anti-Treaty IRA attack Bantry in western County Cork for several hours. They withdraw after losing four officers and more men killed. Four Free State soldiers are also killed and two wounded in the attack.
- In north Cork, near Millstreet, two lorries of Free State troops are ambushed by IRA Cork 1 Brigade members. Two Anti-Treaty fighters are killed and two wounded. Five Free State troops are wounded.
- 31 August – The Anti-Treaty IRA mounts gun and grenade attacks against Free State soldiers at Stephen's Green, Dublin. In Cork, there is an exchange of fire between Free State troops and Anti-Treaty snipers. One Republican is killed by machine gun fire.
- August – Republicans blow up the railway bridge over the river Blackwater at Mallow, County Cork, disabling the rail line between Cork and Dublin.
- August – Two Republicans are taken from a car in Drumcondra in Dublin and shot dead. Their bodies are left on the street. A British soldier on the scene reported that the car contained three men in "Provisional Government uniform" and three more in trench coats – presumed to be from the CID intelligence unit.
- Three unarmed Free State soldiers are shot at Glasson, near Athlone. One is killed.

=== September 1922 ===
- A civilian, Livingstone Cooke, is shot dead by gunmen thought to be Republicans, at Old Blackrock Road, Cork City.
- 2 September –
  - Republicans attack Macroom, County Cork with infantry and a captured armoured car. They withdraw after a seven-hour fire fight.
  - Republicans attack Free State troops while they are drilling in front of the City Club in Cork city. They drive up in a lorry and open machine-gun fire on the Free State troops, killing two and injuring six.
  - Two Free State soldiers are killed in an ambush at Watergrass Hill, County Cork.
- There are attacks by Anti-Treaty fighters on Free State troops in Dublin city centre and Tallaght and Rathfarnham in County Dublin. In an ambush, one civilian is killed, and a Free State soldier and another civilian are wounded. Two Free State soldiers are wounded in an attack in Rathfranham and the RIC barracks there is destroyed.
- Three CID police are shot in an ambush at Dean Grange, Dublin, one later dies.
- Anti-Treaty IRA members Leo Murray and Rodney Murphy, Deans Grange are shot in their beds at lodge house of Newpark Lodge, Stillorgan, Dublin. Another, John Joe Stephens, Bellek, Fermanagh is taken from his lodgings at 7 Gardiner Place and shot at Naas Road, Dublin, the following day. National Army or CID personnel are assumed to be responsible.
- 3 September – Massbrook House, Crossmolina, County Mayo is burnt down by Republicans.
- 4 September – An Anti-Treaty IRA unit under Liam Pilkington takes Dromhaire barracks, County Sligo. The Free State garrison there surrenders.
- A civilian is shot dead by Free State troops in a raid on a shop at Capel Street, Dublin.
- 4 September –
  - A Free State convoy is ambushed near Aughatubrid, County Kerry. Two Free State soldiers are killed and two wounded. One Republican is wounded and captured.
  - The Castle in Ballina, the historic seat of the Earl of Arran, is burnt and destroyed by Republicans. Around 350 priceless paintings in the Earl's art collection are destroyed.
- 5 September – A secret meeting takes place between Richard Mulcahy and Éamon de Valera, political leader of the Republicans, to try to arrange a truce. However, according to de Valera, they, "couldn't find a basis" of agreement.
- A large party of Republican fighters attack Carrickmacross barracks, County Monaghan. The attack is unsuccessful but one Free State soldier is killed.
- A Free State soldier is assassinated at Barrack Street, Cork, while visiting his family.
- There are gun attacks on Free State posts in Waterford City. One civilian, Kate Walsh is killed. Separately two bodies of anti-Treaty fighters, buried clandestinely after a previous action are dug up in Waterford.
- Republicans ambush Free State troops in Glenacone County Limerick, but are worsted in the ensuing action. One IRA officer, D Finich of Cork 2 Brigade is killed and 12 prisoners are taken. Two Free State soldiers are wounded.
- 6 September – A Free State column is ambushed outside Kilkelly, County Mayo by Anti-Treaty fighters. The Free State troops have five wounded and claim to have killed seven Republicans.
- A skirmish takes place in Mitchelstown, County Cork. One Anti-Treaty officer is killed and 12 of his men are captured.
- 8 September – Republican activist Timothy Kenefick is abducted from his home in Cork city by Free State troops. He is shot dead and his body is dumped near Macroom. Anti-Treaty fighters attack Free State posts protecting the railway line around Limerick Junction, County Tipperary. One Free State soldier and one Republican are killed and several others wounded in the fighting.
- 9 September – Republicans attack and take Kenmare in County Kerry. A total of 84 Anti-Treaty fighters take over the town and shoot dead local pro-treaty officer Tom "Scarteen" O'Connor and his brother after taking them prisoner. They take 120 Free State troops in the town prisoner, but later release them. They capture 110 rifles and 20,000 rounds of ammunition. This action allowed the Kerry Anti-Treaty units to pursue a fairly effective guerrilla campaign for the remainder of the war.
- A British intelligence report states that the Free State intelligence unit, the Crime Investigation Department or CID has, "murdered a number of prominent Republicans" in Dublin.
- Anti-Treaty fighters attack the barracks at Carrickmacross. One Free State soldier is killed and two wounded in the firing. A civilian is also killed in the crossfire.
- 10 September – Anti-Treaty ambush of Free State troops near Rathmore, County Kerry. Seven Free State soldiers are killed. The Republicans retreat after an artillery piece is brought up to fire seven shells at them.
- Republicans take Tarbert, County Kerry temporarily, capturing 40 rifles.
- 11 September – A Free State column travelling from Macroom, County Cork, towards Kerry, is attacked with a mine on a bridge at Carrigphooka in west County Cork. Free State commandant Tom Keogh and eight other soldiers are killed in the blast. A Republican prisoner is shot dead in reprisal by Dublin Guard troops.
- 12 September – The Battle of Ballina – Republicans under Michael Kilroy take Ballina, in a surprise attack while the Free State troops there are at a Mass service for a comrade killed in the fighting. Kilroy's men capture 100 rifles and 20,000 rounds of ammunition, and are reported by Free State authorities to have looted £25,000 worth of goods from local shops. Local banks are also raided. Kilroy later admits to drunkenness and indiscipline on behalf of his men. Two civilians are shot dead in the fire-fight between the combatants. One victim is a young woman called Connie Tynan – aged 19 – from Tullamore. The Republicans leave the town when Free State reinforcements arrive from Crossmolina, County Mayo. The Republicans' armoured car breaks down in the retreat and has to be abandoned.
- Anti-Treaty IRA attack a lorry of Free State troops in Dublin on the South Circular Road. A grenade misses the lorry and explodes in an adjacent newsagents, killing two civilians, one a 7-year-old girl. The Free State soldiers chase the ambushers through the streets man and catch two of them. Both are shot on Bishops Street, allegedly after trying to escape. One, Sean McEvoy, dies.
- 13 September – The Anti-Treaty IRA in Dublin mounts three separate ambushes of Free State troops at Stephen's Green, Mountjoy Square and O'Connell Bridge in the city centre. The ambushes, consisting of gun and grenade attacks, result in the death of one Republican, the injury of another and the serious wounding of three Free State soldiers and three civilians.
- 14 September – Republicans under Michael Kilroy ambush a Free State convoy near Belderg, County Mayo, killing 4 Free State soldiers and capturing 16. Republican losses are reported in the press as 10 killed and more wounded, but this may be an overstatement.
- Drumshambo barracks in County Leitrim is seized by Republicans after successful ambush of Free State troops.
- A skirmish takes place at Stuake, Donoughmore, County Cork. Two Republicans are killed and another arrested and executed.
- Press reports say that a total of six Anti-Treaty and six Free State troops are killed in an ambushes at Blarney.
- Republican fighters open fire on Free State troops landing by sea at Courtmacsherry, County Cork. Three Anti-Treaty fighters and one Free State soldier are killed.
- In Killarney, Free State troops break into the houses of six female Republicans and paint their bodies green.
- 15 September –
  - Second consecutive night of sniping attacks in Dublin. Anti-Treaty fighters attempt to take over the Telephone exchange and Kingsbridge Railway Station in Dublin. They also attack the Wellington and Portobello military barracks. The attacks were driven off by Free State troops after several hours of firing.
  - The Battle of Glenamoy (Mayo) – Following the invasion of Ballina by Republican forces, a detachment of Free State troops leave Ballina and travel through Crossmolina on their way to Glenlossara Lodge, Belderrig, where Republicans are reported to be concentrated in numbers. The detachment arrest six Republicans in Belmullet. In Glenamoy, an advanced party of Free State soldiers encounter an Anti-Treaty IRA position in the house of a family where two sons were serving in the Army. Given the large numbers of Republicans, the Free State pull back and wait for reinforcements from Ballina. As the Free State troops pass through Sheskin, four are killed when the Republicans open fire with machine guns. Free State reinforcements arrive and a five-hour gun battle breaks out. Two Free State soldiers are killed and one is injured. The Republicans suffer ten dead.
- In Dundalk, the Anti-Treaty IRA made several attacks on Free State troops and took over the power station, cutting off the town's electricity supply. One Free State soldier is killed by a hand grenade in the clashes.
- The Free State post at Athboy, County Meath is attacked. One soldier is killed.
- The Free State's Lord Chief Justice rules that the country is in a state of war and Habeas Corpus no longer applies. He rejects an application to free two of the 5,000 prisoners taken by National forces since the outbreak of the civil war.
- 16 September –
  - Michael Kilroy's Anti-Treaty IRA men attack Newport, County Mayo, but fail to take it and withdraw after a day of fighting.
  - The Anti-Treaty IRA mount three gun and grenade attacks in Dublin city, at Curzon Street, Capel Street and Drumcondra. Two Free State troops are wounded along with 5 civilians. One civilian is killed.
- 17 September – CID Headquarters (Oriel House in Dublin) is stormed and a CID officer is shot dead by Anti-Treaty IRA. There is a fire fight on Mount street bridge as the Anti-Treaty party makes its getaway. Republican fighter Patrick Mannion is shot in the head by Free State troops as he lies wounded.
- An ambush is mounted on Stephens Green in central Dublin. One civilian is killed in the crossfire. Another civilian is killed during an exchange of fire on Merchant's Quay in the city centre.
- 18 September – Three Free State troops are killed in an ambush near Nenagh, County Tipperary as they were about to enter a Church for Mass.
- 19 September –
  - Republican fighter Bertie Murphy is shot dead in Killarney, County Kerry, by National Army troops in reprisal for ambushes in the area.
  - Seán Mac Eoin begins a Free State sweep of northern County Sligo to clear it of Anti-Treaty guerrillas. The operation is largely successful. By the end of the operation, Free State forces are in control of all the towns in County Sligo and the conflict there becomes a low level guerrilla affair. 54 people are killed in the county during the entire civil war, 22 Free State troops, 21 Republicans and 11 civilians. Of these, all but 8 have been killed by the end of September 1922. During MacEoin's operation, a Republican column, including an armoured car, is cornered north of Sligo town. The car is put out of action and six Republicans flee up the slopes of Ben Bulben mountain. All six are killed by the pursuing Free State troops, four of them, it is alleged, are killed after surrendering. Among those killed are Cpt. Harry Benson, and Brian MacNeill, (son of Eoin MacNeill, founder of the Irish Volunteers), who is shot at close range in the forehead. One National Army sergeant is killed in the operation and 30 Irregulars are taken prisoner.
- 20 September – A Free State soldier is accidentally killed cleaning his rifle in County Cork and a civilian girl is killed in Kildare by bomb she found in an outhouse.
- The Free State barracks in Drumshambo, County Leitrim is attacked and one soldier is killed.
- Free State Civic Guard Charles Wood accidentally shot dead by a colleague, Ship Street Barracks, Dublin
- 22 September – One Free State soldier is killed and several soldiers and three civilians are injured in a gun and grenade attack by Republicans on Free State troops at noon on Eden Quay, central Dublin.
- 23 September – Anti-Treaty fighter Michael Neville, is taken from work in Dublin and found shot dead at Killester Cemetery by Pro-Treaty forces.
- Two Free State soldiers are killed in two separate ambushes in Kerry.

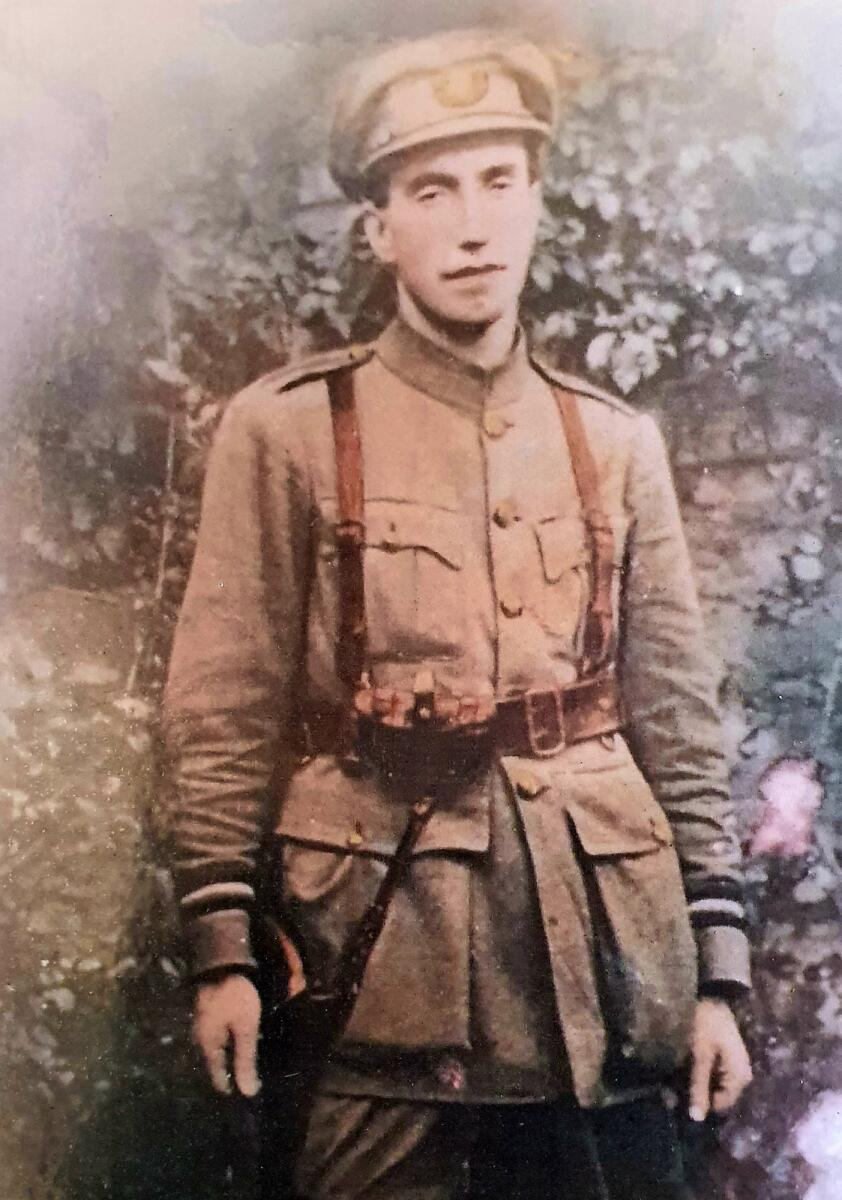
Brigadier Joseph Ring, Free State Army

- The Anti-Treaty IRA mounts three attacks in Dublin. In Drumcondra, 10 civilians are wounded by a grenade thrown at an Army lorry. On Eden Quay, one soldier is killed and three wounded along with four civilians wounded in a gun and grenade attack. On Merchant's Quay, a civilian is killed in another grenade attack.
- 24 September – the Free State evacuates its garrison at Newport, County Mayo due to the intense guerrilla activity in the area.

Republican ambush in the Ox Mountains kills up to 15 Free State soldiers, including Brigadier Joe Ring.

- 27 September –
  - The Free State's Provisional Government puts the "Public Safety Bill" before the Dáil, setting up military courts which allow for the execution of men captured bearing arms against the state and aiding and abetting attacks on state forces. It passes by 48 votes to 18. The Irish Labour Party oppose it.
  - About 500 Anti-Treaty IRA men attack Killorglin, County Kerry, led by Seán Hyde. However, they fail to dislodge a pro-treaty garrison of 60 men from Clare who hold the barracks in the town. British Intelligence reports that 23 Republicans are killed in the action and 30 wounded. Anti-Treaty soldier David Robinson admits to 2 killed, 15 wounded and 14 captured. The Republicans disperse after 24 hours of fighting, when Free State troops arrive from Tralee.
- Two Free State soldiers are killed in an ambush at Brennan's Glen, County Kerry.
- 28 September – In County Kerry, John Galvin, a Republican captured in the Killorglin raid is shot by Free State troops in Tralee and his body dumped in nearby Ballyseedy wood. Galvin had admitted under interrogation to the killing of a National Army officer at Castlemaine. A Free State soldier is also shot dead while on sentry duty at Rathmore courthouse.
- Anti-Treaty forces mount an ambush at Kilfenora, County Clare. One Free State captain, Consadine is killed.
- The Republican leader Tom Barry, who was captured in the Dublin fighting, escapes from an internment camp in Gormanston, County Dublin.
- A Free State medical orderly named Lydon is shot dead by a Republican sniper as he cycles out of Tralee, despite the fact that he is unarmed and wearing a Red Cross armband.
- September – A Free State garrison at Oldcastle, County Meath is attacked and forced to surrender its weapons. A mine is detonated against their barracks and fire is opened with machine guns. A civilian is killed in the crossfire.
- 30 September – A lorry of Free State troops is attacked with grenades and guns at O'Connell Bridge, central Dublin. One soldier is killed and three wounded. Four civilians are also wounded.
- An off duty Free State soldier, Volunteer Shercock, is seized and shot dead near Dundalk.
- 31 September – The barracks in Cavan town is attacked early in the morning, a mine is exploded but there are no casualties.

=== October 1922 ===
- 2 October – In County Mayo, Irregulars launch a night-time attack on Ballina Workhouse, where the National Army are garrisoned. The Irregulars bomb the workhouse gate. The gun battle last eight hours. Eventually, the Irregulars retreat via Knockmore.
- 3 October –
  - The Free State offers an amnesty to Anti-Treaty fighters who surrender their arms and recognise the government.
  - Irregulars attack the National Army garrison at Ballyhaunis, County Mayo.
- There are attacks on Free State troops at Cahir, County Tipperary and Omeath, County Louth. One officer, Captain Walshe is killed and three others wounded in an ambush in Tipperary. The telephone link between Dublin and Dundalk is cut.
- 4 October –
  - Four Anti-Treaty IRA fighters and one Free State soldier are killed in an action at Upton, County Cork. National Army troops mount a sweep to try and occupy the Republican stronghold around Ballyvourney but meet with "stiff resistance".
  - Irregulars ambush Free State troops on Station Road, Claremorris. No casualties were reported. Later that evening, troops were dispatched by train from Claremorris. Heavy boulders were placed on the line, but the locomotive pushed the obstructions aside. Irregulars open fire on the train, but again, no one was injured.
- Free State troops shoot dead a man they state is an 'Irregular', at Coolnamuck County Waterford who failed to halt at a checkpoint and arrest three others.
- In ambush of a Free State motor patrol at Brennan's Glen, County Kerry, two National Army troops are killed and seven wounded by anti-Treaty fighters firing from concealed positions. An anti-Treaty prisoner who had been in Free State custody on the patrol was also killed.
- Two civilian Free State supporters are abducted and killed at Whitescross, County Cork.
- A National Army officer, Captain Ignatius Redmond is assassinated in County Wexford, shot three times at close range.
- 5 October – An anti-Treaty IRA officer Sean O'Donoghue is shot dead by Free State troops in Cork city, who also arrest 39 men.
- 6 October – National Army officer Tony Lawlor shoots dead Republican prisoner, Patrick Mulrennan during a riot in the prison in Athlone.
- Anti-Treaty fighters in Tullycrine, County Clare ambush a National Army column. A number of Free State troops and one Anti-Treaty IRA man are killed in the firefight.
- A number of gun and grenade attacks are carried out by Republican fighters in Dublin. Three people are wounded. In Limerick, Republicans raid the hospital and free six of their prisoners who were being treated there.
- One Anti-Treaty fighter is killed in action at White's Cross, County Cork.
- 7 October – Charlie Dalton, a National Army intelligence officer, arrests three boys, neighbours of his, Edwin Hughes, aged 17, Brendan Holihan aged 17, and Joe Rogers, aged 16, putting up Republican posters in Drumcondra, Dublin. The next morning they are found shot dead in a ditch in the quarries, Clondalkin, "riddled with bullets" according to the inquest doctor.
- A National Army Lieutenant is found shot in the head on the road near Newtownbarry, County Wexford.
- President Cosgarve's uncle is shot dead as his public house is robbed.
- Two civilian pro-Treaty supporters are shot dead in Cork city and dumped in a turnip field, tied together.
- 9 October –
  - A civilian, Henry Moore, was shot dead by raiders to his house at Stillorgan, county Dublin.
  - An ambush of a National Army patrol takes place near Enniscorthy, County Wexford, two Free State officers are mortally wounded and two civilians are wounded.
- 10 October – The Roman Catholic Bishops of Ireland issue a formal statement, supporting the Free State as the lawful and democratic government, denouncing the Anti-Treaty campaign as an unlawful rebellion and denying their fighters access to Holy Communion or Confession.
- A Free State officer is killed in an ambush between Clonmel and Cahir.
- Peadar Breslin, a Republican captured after the fall of the Four Courts, is shot dead during an attempt to escape from Mountjoy Prison in Dublin. Three Free State soldiers are also killed in the fire fights during the escape attempts.
- In County Wexford, a senior Free State army officer, Commandant Peter Doyle, of Ballinakill, Marshalstown, is shot in the grounds of St. Aidan's Cathedral, Enniscorthy, by Anti-Treaty I.R.A. after mass. Five girls are injured in the process, two of them seriously.
- 11 October –
  - Two Free State soldiers are killed in ambush in County Cork, between Dunmanway and Clonakilty.
  - Irregulars hijack a cargo ship in Westport and direct it to Newport. Four hundred tons of flour are unloaded in Newport. The ship is then allowed to proceed to Liverpool.
- 13 October – A Free State soldier is killed in an ambush of a troop lorry at Ulverton Road, Dalkey, County Dublin.
- Two Free State soldiers are killed in kerry, one in Rathmore, the other in Abbeydorney.
- The railway hotel at Recess, County Galway, is burned down by Republicans (together with nearby Glendalough House) to prevent National troops from using them as billets.
- 14 October – An ambush in the Cornmarket area of Dublin leaves three civilians and four Free State soldiers wounded. In a separate ambush near Tralee, one National Army soldier is killed and another wounded.
- 15 October – The Public Safety Bill comes into effect. The bill called for people to hand over their weapons in a brief amnesty, after which time the possession of arms could be punishable by execution. This led to the summary executions of captured Anti-Treaty fighters.
- 15–16 October – In County Mayo, irregulars rob the banks in Belmullet and Bangor Erris. They also collect an "annual license duty' from the publicans in the towns.
- 15 October – In Swagh North, County Mayo, Irregulars attack two lorry loads of National Army Troops, one of whom is killed and another wounded.
- Directives are sent to the press by Free State director of communications, Piaras Béaslaí to the effect that; Free State troops are to be referred to as the "National Army", the "Irish Army", or just "troops". The Anti-Treaty side are to be called "Irregulars" and are not to be referred to as "Republicans", "IRA", "forces", or "troops", nor are the ranks of their officers allowed to be given. No letters about the treatment of Anti-Treaty prisoners are to be published. The words "attacked, commandeered and arrested" as used to describe their actions are to be replaced by, "fired at, seized and kidnapped".
- A civilian pawnbroker is shot dead by unidentified gunmen in Cork city.
- 17 October –
  - An Anti-Treaty force attacks the National Army posts in Charleville, County Cork. They claim two soldiers are killed and one mortally wounded, National Army reports three wounded
  - The National Army garrison in Dundalk is 'stood to' in anticipation of night attack by anti-Treaty fighters. One Free State soldier is accidentally shot and killed.
  - In County Mayo, National Army Troops, based in Charlestown, surround Ballaghaderreen and arrest a number of Irregulars. An eight-man patrol is sent out to nearby Carracastle. When the troops reach the village, two Irregulars open fire. One Irregular is killed and the other is arrested.
- 19 October – A Free State soldier is killed by sniper near Naas, County Kildare. Another dies in an accidental shooting at Corporation Street, central Dublin.
- Irregulars attack the National Army Garrison in Crossmolina, County Mayo. Free state soldiers eventually beat off the attackers after five hours.
- 20 October – In County Kerry, a Free State soldier is shot dead while trying to clear a blocked road at Duagh. Another is killed the following day at Lawlor's Cross.
- National Army troops raid and capture a bomb making factory at Gardiner Street, Dublin. A Free State captain, Nicholas Tobin, brother of Liam Tobin is accidentally shot dead by his own troops.
- 22 October –
  - Four soldiers of the National Army were killed when a Lancia car they were travelling in was bombed near Ferrycarrig County Wexford.Three other National Army Troops were injured in the attack.
  - Two National Army soldiers are killed at Woodhouse County Waterford when their lorry is ambushed The driver is also wounded. Private Larry Phelan of Kilmacthomas Waterford was shot dead. Private Patrick Foley of Waterford died from wounds.
- 24 October – Three Free State soldiers are killed in an ambush at Graney, County Kildare and five wounded. Their tender is ambushed on the road to Baltinglass.
- A Free State soldier is also killed in Limerick.
- 25 October – Éamon de Valera, at the request of the IRA Army Executive, sets up a "Republican Cabinet", formed from Anti-Treaty TDs to: "be temporarily the Supreme Executive of the Republic and the State, until such time as the elected Parliament of the Republic can freely assemble, or the people being rid of external aggression are at liberty to decide freely how they are to be governed".
- Two Free State soldiers are killed, one in a firefight near Abbeydorney, County Kerry, the other by a sniper in Dundalk.
- At an action near Castletownroche, County Cork, three IRA fighters are reported by the press to have been killed and nine wounded, having returned to the village for a funeral.
- A Free State soldier is fatally wounded by a sniper in Castletownmount, near Dundalk.
- 28 October – Three Free State soldiers are killed.
- Two Free State soldiers die in hospital in Limerick. One mortally wounded by a grenade attack in Limerick City on the 24th, another accidentally shot by another soldier cleaning a Thompson submachine gun.
- 29 October – An Anti-Treaty IRA column under Michael Kilroy attacks and takes Clifden, County Galway, capturing 80 Free State soldiers, after a ten-hour gun battle. The Irregulars burn the barracks there and take the Free State soldiers rifles before retreating. In a separate incident, a Free State soldier is killed by a landmine.
- 30 October – National Army troops raid Ballyheigue County Kerry. One Anti-Treaty fighter is killed, allegedly after he had been taken prisoner.
- Late October – The bodies of four Anti-Treaty IRA men are found in hay stack at Rockview, Delvin, County Westmeath. They were killed by their own bomb while trying to blow up a bridge.
- 31 October – A civilian, James Cullinan of Kilnamona, County Clare, is shot dead by the roadside near his home by unknown gunmen.

=== November 1922 ===
- 1 November – A 20 strong Anti-Treaty IRA column encounters 250 Free State troops at Brockagh Fahy, County Mayo. Six Republicans are captured, one is wounded and another is killed.
- Five civilians are wounded by a grenade blast at an ambush in Henry Street, central Dublin.
- 2 November – Skirmish near Headford, County Kerry, one Anti-Treaty IRA man and a Free State soldier are killed.
- 3 November – Tom Powell and his East Mayo Anti-Treaty IRA unit are captured in Ballinrobe, County Mayo.
- Republicans attack Free State General Richard Mulcahy's official residence adjoining a military barracks in Portobello, Dublin. A grenade is thrown into the house and fire is opened with revolvers before troops from the barracks are mobilised. One Anti-Treaty fighter is shot dead.
- 3 November – A Free State soldier and a civilian are killed in a car accident at North Wall, Dublin.
- 4 November – Ernie O'Malley, second-in-command of the Anti-Treaty IRA, is captured following a shoot out with Free State soldiers in a house on Ailesbury Road in Donnybrook, south Dublin. O'Malley is hit over 20 times, but survives and is taken prisoner. He shoots dead a National Army soldier in the gun fight.
- Two Free State soldiers are killed by a land mine and gun attack on a patrol near Dundalk. Another two are killed in Kerry.
- Skirmish between National Army and Republican troops who attack military posts in two villages, Enniskean and Ballineen in West Cork. Five Free State soldiers are injured, two fatally. Republican losses are at least two dead; a section commander Tadhg O'Leary and a volunteer, both IRA West Cork Brigade.
- 5 November – 4 civilians are killed in Tubbercurry, three are shot dead by anti-Treaty fighters and one shot by Free State troops at a roadblock.
- The National Army arrests Republican at checkpoint and executes him on the side of the road, in Peake near Coachford, County Cork.
- Two British merchant sailors are shot dead by National Army troop in Youghal, County Cork when they failed to stop at a checkpoint.
- 6 November – Republicans attack the National Army barracks at Glanmire, County Cork. One civilian is wounded in the crossfire.
- A prisoner, Michael Buckley, is shot dead in Limerick Prison by National Army troops for 'signalling to political prisoners'.
- 8 November – Five people are killed in an attack in Dublin. Anti-Treaty IRA fighters attack Wellington Barracks in Dublin. They open fire with machine guns and rifles from across the Grand Canal on National Army troops drilling on the parade square. In the ensuing firefight, one Free Soldier is killed and fourteen wounded, seven of whom require surgery. Two Republicans are killed and six captured, along with a machine gun, by Free State reinforcements rushed from Portobello. Two civilians are killed in the crossfire and many wounded. One of the IRA dead, James Spain, is allegedly executed while unarmed after capture.
- One Civil Guard is mortally wounded.
- Anti-Treaty fighters mount an ambush of a Free State cycling patrol near Milltown, Kerry, County Kerry. Two civilians (30-year-old Jeremiah McKenna and his mother) are killed in the firing.
- A Free State soldier, Daniel Dennehy of Cork is shot dead by machine gun fire while guarding a railway near Mallow, County Cork.
- 9 November – Anti-Treaty fighters in Dublin attack Portobello barracks. One Anti-Treaty fighter is killed.
- William Ahearne shot as an alleged spy by the Anti-Treaty IRA and dumped in Bishopstown, Cork.
- A Free State sergeant is accidentally shot by a sentry in Cahersiveen, County Kerry.
- There are simultaneous night attacks on Wellington and Portobello barracks in Dubin by Anti-Treaty fighters. In 20 minutes of firing, one Free State soldier is hit in the head. Two civilians are found shot dead in Rathmines, near Portobello – it is presumed killed in the crossfire.
- 11 November – Republican head of propaganda Erskine Childers is captured by the Free State at the house of Robert Barton in Annamoe, County Wicklow.
- A civilian is shot dead by Free State patrol on Queen Street, Dublin.
- 13 November – Free State troops raid Newtownshandrum, County Cork at night, looking for Anti-Treaty fighters. Two are arrested with arms but the troops also fire on a pony and trap, killing civilian Molly Egan
- A civilian, James Martin is shot dead by anti-Treaty raiders at his home at Drumcar, County Cavan. Another civilian is killed in North Frederick Street, Dublin.
- 14 November – Garda Síochána Garda Henry Phelan killed by anti-treaty insurgents at Mullinahone, County Tipperary
- 15 November – A seven-man Free State Army patrol, escorting a prisoner is ambushed at Ulverton road, Dalkey, County Dublin. A Free State soldier and a civilian are killed in the action, in which shots are exchanged and two grenades are thrown by the Anti-Treaty fighters.
- 17 November – Four Anti-Treaty IRA men from Dublin, who were captured with weapons in County Wicklow, are shot by firing squad.
- An IRA fighter, Phillip Kilgam is killed in an exchange of fire in Manorhamilton, County Leitrim.
- 18 November – Four Anti-Treaty IRA fighters are killed when a land mine they are preparing on the Naas road near Dublin explodes prematurely.
- A Free State lorry, driving from Dundalk is destroyed by a remotely detonated landmine in Carrickmacross. One soldier is killed and ten are badly injured. IRA fighters took the wounded men's weapons and equipment but also tried to give them first aid. Another FS soldier is killed in Manorhamilton.
- 19 November – Three more Republican prisoners are executed in Dublin by the Free State.
- Free State troops fire on a Republican rally on O'Connell Street, Dubin that was protesting against the mistreatment of prisoners. One civilian is killed and seven wounded.
- 21 November – A Free State soldier is killed in an ambush between Tallaght and Clondalkin, Dublin.
- 23 November – The Battle of Newport – A National Army begin an operation to clear out Irregular forces from Newport, County Mayo. The force surprises Michael Kilroy and the leader of the Mayo Anti-Treaty IRA at Carrowbeg house. In the ensuing fight, 5 National Army soldiers and Two Irregulars are killed and more are wounded. Artillery is used against Irregulars who are holding positions in the hills outside the town. The operation leads to the capture of 70 Irregulars.
- Free State troops re-take Newport, County Mayo, after some resistance by Republicans. The Free State troops reportedly took 35 casualties between killed and wounded before the Republicans abandoned their positions and the National Army took possession of the town.
- In the rest of the month of November – Free State troops under Tony Lawlor sweep south and west County Mayo and Connemara for Republican guerrillas. Lawlor reports that 5 of his men were killed in the operation and 9 wounded. He reports the Republican losses as 9 killed, 19 wounded and 23 taken prisoner. Thirty National Army soldiers are also hospitalised as a result of influenza.
- One Free State soldier is killed and another badly injured when their truck crashes in Dalkey, Dublin, while driving too fast close to the scene of an ambush on 15 November.
- A Free State soldier is killed by a shotgun blast at Lixnaw, County Kerry.
- 24 November – Former Treaty negotiator Erskine Childers is executed by the Free State, having been captured in possession of a pistol-which, ironically, had been given to Childers by Michael Collins (Irish leader). There are attacks that night on Protobello and Wellignton attacks in Dublin but inflicting no casualties.
- 25 November – The Anti-Treaty IRA mount an attack on Oriel House, Dublin. Several IRA fighters are captured at nearby Harcourt Street and one Anti-Treaty fighter is shot and killed.
- 29 November – A Free State soldier is killed in an ambush at Rearcross, County Tipperary.
- 30 November – In reprisal for the executions, Liam Lynch, Anti-Treaty IRA Commander, issues a general order to his forces to kill members of the Dáil (T.D.s) and senators who had voted for the Emergency Powers legislation. He also orders the killing of hostile judges and newspaper editors.
- Three Anti-Treaty IRA prisoners are executed by firing squad in Dublin for possession of arms.
- Anti-Treaty IRA officer Patrick Lynch is killed in a Free State raid on his home in Moyrisk, County Kerry.
- Two National Army soldiers are killed in an action at Ballinamult, Woodhouse, County Waterford.
- Anti-Treaty fighters ambush Free State troops near Tubbercurry, County Sligo. Two National Army soldiers are killed.
- November – members of the South Wexford Brigade I.R.A. (Anti-Treaty) ambush a Lorry near Begerin, Old Ross, carrying Free State soldiers, killing one and wounding seven others.
- November – In several 'sweep' operations, National Army troops capture over 200 Anti-Treaty fighters (including 8 women) in County Kerry in this month, along with a substantial quantity of arms and explosives.

=== December 1922 ===
- 1 December – After a skirmish on the border of County Kildare and County Meath, the Meath Anti-Treaty IRA column, consisting of 22 men under Patrick Mullaney is captured. The Republicans attack a Free State supply truck near Leixlip. One Republican and one Free State soldier are killed in the action and three Republicans are wounded. Five of the Anti-Treaty men, who had previously deserted from the National Army, are executed in Dublin on 8 January 1923 for 'treachery'.
- Several hundred National Army troops mount a major operation in Dublin, setting up checkpoints at all major roads in an effort to halt the daily small scale ambushes in the city. They stop and search all in-coming traffic and male civilians for arms. Three men are found carrying weapons and detained. The military barracks at Tallaght, County Dublin is attacked that night. Four Free State soldiers are wounded by gunfire.
- Dublin Guard troops end a week of sweeps in Kerry, having raided Rathmore, Killcummin and Barraduff, capturing 39 Anti-Treaty IRA men as well as arms and equipment. A separate sweep in the Currow/Scartaglen area takes another 15 prisoners and 4 more are captured elsewhere in the county.
- 4 December – A party of 60 Republican fighters ambushes a Free State convoy of two lorries on Drimoleague Road, near Dunmanway in West Cork. One National Army sergeant is killed. The National Army troops call for air support and an aeroplane bombs and machine guns the Anti-Treaty fighters before they disperse. Press reports say they suffered, 'many casualties'.
- 5 December – In County Mayo, a National Army soldier – Vol. John Moyles from Crossmolina – is shot dead by a sniper in Ballyhaunis. His body was taken to Claremorris barracks where hundreds of local people paid their respects.
- Early December – Kenmare, County Kerry (captured by Republicans on 9 September) is re-taken by Free State troops under General Murphy.
- 6 December – The Irish Free State is formally established by the British House of Commons.
- National Army troops encounter 80 Republicans at Kilcash, County Tipperary occupying a hill top position. A fire fight breaks out that lasts for three hours. Two Republicans are killed, four wounded and eleven captured. The remainder of their column gets away by burning the furze bushes to cover their retreat. Free State troops have three men wounded.
- 7 December – Former IRA men in the War of Independence and pro-Treaty TD, Seán Hales is shot dead by Anti-Treaty gunmen on Ormonde Quay as he set out for Leinster House. Another TD, Pádraic Ó Máille is also shot and wounded in the incident.
- One Anti-Treaty fighter, Hugh O'Donnell, a native of the Caherconlish district, is killed in a skirmish in Ballintubber, Kilfinane, in County Limerick.
- A Free State patrol is ambushed on Harcourt Street, Dublin, one civilian, a waitress in a hotel, is shot dead in the crossfire.
- Free State soldier Thomas Leahy, was accidentally shot dead by one of his comrades while guarding Cahir Castle in County Tipperary.
- A Free State soldier, Charles Glass is killed at his home in Dundalk by two gunmen.
- 8 December –
  - Anti-Treaty leaders captured in the Four Courts in July, Rory O'Connor, Liam Mellows, Dick Barrett and Joe McKelvey are executed by the Free State in revenge for the killing of Seán Hales. This is an illegal act, as the four were captured before the Dáil passed its emergency legislation.
  - Two Anti-Treaty fighters are killed in an action at Kealkill, County Cork.
- 9 December – Republican raid on the barracks in Sligo town. One Free State soldier is killed.
- 10 December – Anti-Treaty IRA members burn down the house of TD Seán McGarry, his seven-year-old son dies in the blaze.
- Two prisoners attempt to escape from Drumboe Castle, County Donegal. They are shot by Free State troops under Major Glennon, and one Gallagher is killed.
- A civilian, James Malone, is shot dead at his home in Garald Griffin Street, Cork city by unidentified gunmen.
- 13 December – 100 Republican fighters under Tom Barry take Carrick-on-Suir in a surprise attack, capturing 107 rifles, two Lewis Guns and two armoured cars. They do not attempt to hold the town however.
- An Anti-Treaty column of ten men at Moore's Bridge, County Kildare is surprised by a National Army raid and captured. One of the Anti-Treaty men is killed, allegedly due to a beating with rifle butts, though the troops claim he was shot trying to escape. Seven of the others are executed in Dublin on 19 December. They had ambushed a Free State patrol on 25 November and derailed two trains on 11 December.
- 14 December – Free State garrisons at Thomastown and Mullinavat in County Kilkenny surrender to the Republican column under Tom Barry, which took two other towns the day before. The Free State troops hand over their arms and in some cases join the Republicans.
- 15 December –
  - 70 Anti-Treaty IRA fighters ambush a Free State patrol between Rathmore and Barraduff. There is a gun battle of several hours, in which one National Army soldier is fatally wounded. The Army claims that the Republicans took "heavy casualties" in the action. The local priest tries to prevent the ambush and mobilises local people to remove a roadblock. The IRA in response seize four of his cattle.
  - A National Army officer is accidentally shot in Ballina. He survives the accident but loses his leg.
- 16 December – the Free State post in Carrick-on-Shannon is attacked and taken by anti-Treaty fighters. One FS soldier and one civilian, are killed. Four Lorries and a large quantity of arms are taken.
- Two anti-Treaty fighters are killed in County Carlow.
- A civilian Eric Wolfe, is taken from his trap by unknown gunmen near Kinsale, County Cork and killed by multiple gunshots.
- Free State troops come upon what they describe as a 'large body of Irregulars' near Ballingarry, County Tipperary. They report that two killed and eleven taken prisoner, with two of their troops wounded.
- Free State troops near Carrick on Suir shoot dead a civilian, Patrick Martin, who approaches them with a revolver.
- Free State troops retake Clifden.
- 17 December – the last British troops leave the Free State. They are the remnants of a 5,000 strong garrison maintained up to that point in Dublin, commanded by Nevil Macready.
- Two National Army soldiers (a Sergeant and an officer) are killed. Lt. John Keogh is killed in an ambush on his patrol in Naas, County Kildare, Sgt Thoma Walsh is killed when his armoured car crashed in Phoenix Park, Dublin.
- 18 December – Armed raiders kill a father and son named Dennison at Drumkeeran, County Leitrim.
- 19 December – Seven Republican fighters, all from County Kildare, are executed in the Curragh. They had been captured on 13 December.
- Four National Army soldiers are killed in action
- 20 December – Pro-Treaty politician Séamus Dwyer is shot dead at his shop in Rathmines, Dublin by Anti-Treaty fighters.
- An anti-Treaty fighter, T Beehan, is shot dead after capture in county Kildare by Free State troops.
- 22 December – A CID Assistant Inspector is wounded in an attack at Ellis Quay, Dublin and dies of his wounds on 29 December.
- 23 December – There are gun and grenade attacks on National Army troops in Dublin, one Free State soldier is killed, Paddy Ftizgerald, shot at close range on Granby Row another soldier and two civilians are wounded.
- The Free State releases 300 Republican prisoners who are no longer considered a threat to national security.
- An IRA column, 60 strong from the Arigna mountains raids the town of Blacklion, County Cavan, looting shops and homes and taking a Free State supporter, Doctor Hamilton captive before they return to the mountains.
- Free State troops in Clones shoot dead a civilian, James Murphy, who failed to stop at roadblock.
- A Free State soldier, Volunteer Fergusson from Cavan, is killed in action in County Kerry.
- 24 December – A priest in Curragheen, County Kerry, alerts the local Free State garrison to the presence of the local Anti-Treaty guerrilla column at Midnight Mass. 22 of them are captured when National Army troops raid the church.
- 25 December – Christmas Day – Joseph MacDonagh, TD, who had been deputy Minister for Labour to Countess Markiewicz, brother of Proclamation of the Irish Republic signatory and 1916 leader Thomas MacDonagh, dies on hunger strike in hospital in Eccles Street, having been hastily removed there when it became clear that his appendix had ruptured and peritonitis had resulted.
- 27 December – The railway station in Ballina is attacked by a sniper.
- 28 December – Republican Francis Lawlor is abducted by Free State forces in Dublin, killed and his body dumped at Orwell Road, Rathgar. An anti-Treaty IRA Volunteer (Michael William Morris) is accidentally killed in County Wexford, monument erected Kyle, County Wexford, buried in Crossabeg cemetery, County Wexford.
- 29 December – Two Anti-Treaty men are executed by the Free State in Kilkenny.
- A Free State foot patrol is ambushed by an IRA column near Castlegregory, County Kerry. Two soldiers are killed and two wounded. Their post in the village is burned. The National Army in Tralee threaten to execute four Republican prisoners in reprisal but after a legal appeal their sentence is commuted to penal servitude
- There is a bomb planted at CID headquarters at Oriel House, Dublin. One Free State soldier is killed and two wounded in the explosion. Two civilians are also wounded.

=== January 1923 ===
- 1 January – An anti-Treaty IRA column is ambushed by National Army troops at Kyle, County Wexford. One IRA fighter is killed and three wounded. One Free State soldier is also wounded in the action.
- 3 January –
  - A National Army patrol is ambushed near Bangor Erris, County Mayo. One Soldier is injured and 14 Irregulars are captured, each in possession of a rifle.
- 4 January – A column of 65 Anti-Treaty fighters from Cork and Kerry IRA units, under Tom Barry, attacks Millstreet, County Cork, under cover of darkness. They use 12 machine guns and take three National Army posts in the town, taking 39 prisoners and capturing one Lewis gun and 35 rifles. However they fail to take the main post in the Town Hall, held by 23 Free State soldiers. They withdraw after several hours – one party to Ballyvourney in County Cork and the other to the Pap mountains in County Kerry. Two Free State soldiers are killed and several more wounded. The National Army reports six Anti-Treaty fatalities and 19 wounded but the Republicans admit to only three wounded.
- 6 January – Skirmish at Ballyconnell on the County Cavan–Fermanagh border, Anti-Treaty IRA captain Michael Cull killed by plain clothes Free State officer while raiding a hardware shop.
- In the Dundalk area two killings are reported. the body of a man John Phelan is found in Castlebellingham, with the notice 'Convicted spy, IRA' pinned on him, he had pointed out houses of antii-Treatyites to Free State forces which were subsequently burnt. In Dundalk itself, a civilian Hugh O'Donnell of Belfast, reported to be 'of Republican sympathies' is shot dead by unknown gunmen.
- 8 January – Four Republican prisoners are executed in Dublin. One National Army soldier is also shot for "treachery" for complicity in an Anti-Treaty ambush of Free State troops at Leixlip.
- 9 January – Anti-Treaty IRA men burn the home of Free State Senator John Philip Bagwell at Marfield, Clonmel, County Tipperary, including the extensive library built up by his father, historian Richard Bagwell.
- 10 January –
  - Two Anti-Treaty IRA officers are killed in a skirmish with Free State troops near Spelsherstown, County Wexford.
  - The National Army barracks in Crossmolina is attacked by a sniper. Several private houses are pierced by bullets. There are no casualties.
- 11 January – 40 Republicans burn the railway station in Sligo town, destroying it and badly damaging seven engines and forty carriages. The Great Southern and Western Railway Company releases a report detailing the damage Anti-Treaty forces have caused to their property over the previous six months; 375 lines damaged, 42 engines derailed, 51 over-bridges and 207 under-bridges destroyed, 83 signal cabins and 13 other buildings destroyed. In the same month, Republicans destroy the railway stations at Ballybunnion and Listowel.
- A Free State soldier is killed in an attack on Dowra barracks, County Cavan.
- 13 January – Three Republican prisoners are executed in Dundalk. A crowd gathers outside the jail to say the rosary but is dispersed when Free State troops open fire on them.
- 15 January – Five Anti-Treaty IRA men are executed by the Free State. Four are shot in Roscrea, County Tipperary, one in Carlow.
- 16 January – Two Republican fighters are killed in a skirmish in County Tipperary.
- 17 January –
  - Three National Army soldiers are killed in action
  - In County Mayo, a National Army patrol is attacked as it returns from Kiltimagh to Swinford. Five National Army Troops are injured, one of which dies of his injuries a few days later. National Army troops return fire, killing one Irregular, and injuring four. A grenade is hurled during the attack that seriously injures a young girl.
- 18 January – Republican leader Liam Deasy is captured by Free State troops in the Galtee Mountains. He is not executed after he signs an order calling for men under his command to surrender.
- Three National Army soldiers are killed in action (six have been killed int two days)
- 19 January – Republican fighters derail the railway line on the bridge near Ardfert, County Kerry. The train crashes, killing its two drivers.
- 20 January –
  - Eleven Republican prisoners are executed by the Free State – two in Limerick, four in Tralee and five in Athlone.
  - In County Mayo, on the road between Kiltimagh and Swinford, a commercial traveler is killed and his companion is seriously injured after they fell into an ambush prepared by Irregulars.
- 22 January – Three Anti-Treaty IRA men are executed in Dundalk, having been captured on 7 January.
- 23 January –
  - Two Republican prisoners are executed in Waterford.
  - Two civilian railway drivers are shot in Tralee railway station. One is killed, another is wounded. Republicans are blamed but do not claim the attack. The Railway drivers issue a statement that "neither murder nor intimidation would prevent them from carrying out their duties". Free State soldier Niall Harrington later alleges the culprits were National Army officers.
  - An Anti-Treaty IRA column under Tom McEllistrim and John Joe Sheehy attacks the National Army barracks, containing 60 troops, in Castlemaine, County Kerry. They use an improvised mortar, one of whose rounds makes a direct hit on the barracks. In a subsequent two-hour gun battle, one Free State soldier is killed, the town's railway station is burned and the bridge over the river Maine blown up by the Republicans. The National Army reports 4 Anti-Treaty fighters killed.
  - Two Free State officers Lt.s Kennedy and Cruise are seized while driving near Clonmel, shot and secretly buried. Their bodies are found on 3 April.
- 25 January – One Free State soldier and one Anti-Treaty fighter are killed in two separate skirmishes in Kerry.
- 26 January –
  - Three men are executed by the Free State in Birr, County Offaly for armed robbery. Although not actually IRA members, having been denied entry on the grounds that they were too young, the three had Republican connections and claimed as 'Republican soldiers' in an Anti-Treaty communique.
  - An anti-Treaty land mine outside Terenure College, Dublin destroys a National Army tender, badly injuring three Free State soldiers and two civilians.
- 27 January – Two Republican prisoners are executed in Portlaoise. The two are Joseph Byrne and Patrick Geraghty, commanders of the IRA Offally Brigade. The executions, 'terrorised' the Offaly Anti-Treatyites, who had killed 5 Free State troops up to that point, but killed only 2 after. A total of 22 people are killed in Offaly during the conflict. 8 Free State troops, 11 Republicans and 3 civilians.
- The Free State executes a total of 34 Republican prisoners during this month, bringing the total number executed so far up to 53.
- 27 January – Anti-Treaty IRA ambush a party of five National Army soldiers at Abbeyfeale, County Kerry. A Captain Coyle is killed and three soldiers wounded. Free State troops pursue the IRA column, killing one of them and wounding another two.
- A civilian William McGowan, is shot dead by a Free State sentry in Dublin's Phoenix Park.
- 28 January – In County Leitrim, Ballinamore Free State barracks, is attacked and taken by Republicans. They take 35 National Army soldiers prisoner, who they take with them back to the Arigna mountains. The barracks itself and the train station are destroyed with explosives.
- 29 January – The Earl of Mayo's house is destroyed and burned by Republicans.
- A Free State soldier is killed in an attack on the National Army post in Castlemaine, County Kerry.
- 30 January – Free State Senator John Bagwell is kidnapped in Dublin by Anti-Treaty fighters. Senator O'Sullivan's house is also burned in Killarney.

=== February 1923 ===
- 1 February – Moore Hall in County Mayo is burned down by Republican guerrillas, because its owner, Maurice Moore is a senator in the Dáil.
- 2 February – One Free State soldier is killed and another wounded in an ambush of a patrol near Cahirsiveen, County Kerry.
- 3 February –
  - A Postmaster J O'Reilly, is shot dead by Republican raiders on the post office at Clonakilty, County Cork.
  - Irregulars attack the railway station in Killala, County Mayo. The set fire to a train and set it into motion, where it crashes into the buffers and eventually lands in the sea. The station is also destroyed.
- 4 February – In Shorne, Rathmore, County Kerry, Anti-Treaty IRA fighter Micheal McSweeney is shot dead by Free State troops.
- Free State troops use IRA prisoners to clear a blocked road near Bandon, County Cork, a booby trap mine explodes while they are clearing a road block, killing two prisoners and injuring seven.
- 5 February –
  - A party of 50 Anti-Treaty IRA fighters, operating from the Arigna mountains, raid the town of Ballyconnell in County Cavan. They shoot dead two civilians and wounded another man. The Post Office was robbed and car dealership blown up. The raid was in reprisal for the shooting of a Republican named Cull the month before in the town.
  - A National Army soldier accidentally shoots dead a civilian, Elizabeth Walsh, in her home in Parnell Street Dublin while she was making him dinner his revolver went off.
- 7 February – An anti-Treaty IRA column attack the Free State post in Ballinamore. The National Army garrison of 35 men surrenders and the barracks is blown up. The prisoners are taken to the Arigna mountains.
- A civilian, Thomas Roche is shot dead at a roadblock near Newcastle West, County Limerick by Free State troops when he failed to halt his car in time.
- 8 February – The Free State suspends executions until 18 February, offering an amnesty to anyone who surrendered before that day.
- 9 February –
  - Two Anti-Treaty fighters are killed in a skirmish at Poleberry, County Waterford, while attempting to hold up a post office.
  - Irregulars attack the train from Castlebar and Westport. Thirty Irregulars lift the tracks, derailing the train. The driver and fireman were injured. The Irregulars disarm a number of National Troops, and then let then return to Westport by foot.
- 10 February – Republican officer Tom Barry, after contacts with some former IRA comrades on the Free State side, proposes that the Anti-Treaty IRA call a truce. Liam Lynch turns down the idea.
- It is reported that tax collectors in County Leitrim are refusing to collect taxes in the county, saying it is too dangerous. They are told to resume collection or be sacked within 3 weeks. The county is 50,000 pounds in arrears due to uncollected rates.
- 10 February – Republicans shoot dead a civilian James Gallagher in Gweedore, County Donegal. He had previously fired at an IRA party raiding his house.
- Republicans open fire on Free State troops as they are leaving Mass in Clonmel, killing one civilian. Separately a National Army lieutenant is killed in an action near Scartaglen, County Kerry along with a civilian. Three anti-Treaty fighters are wounded.
- In Cork city a civilian, Michael Cusack, is mortally wounded in an attack on the city Courthouse.
- 11 February –
  - The Father of Government minister Kevin O'Higgins is shot dead by Republicans at the family home in Stradbally County Laois. The house is also burnt down.
  - Athlone Waterworks is badly damaged by a Republican bomb.
- A civilian carter, James Finlay is shot dead by anti-Treaty fighters near Tullamore, County Offaly.
- 13 February – Two Anti-Treaty men are killed in a raid on their dug out at Currahane Strands, County Kerry.
- 14 February – In Kiltimagh, County Mayo armed Irregulars set fire to a goods store.
- 15 February – Mansion of senator Brian Mahon in Ballymore Eustace, County Kildare is burned down by Anti-Treaty forces. In the remainder of the month, a total of 37 houses of senators are destroyed by the Anti-Treaty IRA. Their owners are mainly big landowners, descendants of the Protestant Ascendancy and many of them were unionists before Irish independence. Oliver St John Gogarty is another prominent victim of house burnings. He also survives an assassination attempt in Dublin.
- 16 February – An unidentified man is found shot dead near Thurles, with the warning pinned on him, 'One out of fifty'.
- 18 February – Up to 1,000 Free-State troops drawn from Cahir, Cashel, Clonmel and Tipperary town encircle the area around the Glen of Aherlow and move in from all sides simultaneously in pursuit of Republican leader Dinny Lacey and his IRA column, which is billetted in the Glen. Lacey and one of his men are killed and many of his column are captured, having been surprised in two different safe-houses. Three of the Free-State troops are mortally wounded during the attack on the house. Lacey was the head of the IRA's 2nd Southern Division and his death crippled the Republican's cause in the County Tipperary/Waterford area.
- 19 February – Anti-Treaty officer Thomas O'Sullivan, head of the local IRA battalion, is shot dead by Free State troops near Dingle.
- 21 February – Anti-Treaty IRA attacks income tax offices in Dublin. Attempts are also made to burn Jury's Hotel, but without success. There are also abortive attacks on Merrion Square, Dawson Street, and Lower O'Connell Street. However tax offices are destroyed at Nassau st, Gardiner st and Beresford Place. A total of 75 Republicans are involved in the action, of whom five are captured.
- 22 February – Nicholas Williams, a member of the Free State militia the Citizens Defence Force, is found shot dead in field on Hollybank Road, Dublin.
- 23 February – National Army troops ambushed by Anti-Treaty fighters at Shramore, County Mayo. The troops were returning to Westport with eight prisoners. After a seven-hour gun balttle, one National Army soldier and a medical orderly are killed.
- An Anti-Treaty column is surprised by National Army troops near Cluid, County Galway. One Republican is killed and eighteen are captured and sentenced to death. Five of the prisoners are later executed.
- 24 February – There are a number of ambushes and sniping attacks in Dublin. One Free State soldiers is killed in an exchange of fire at Cornmarket, another is shot in the thigh on Thomas Street and wounded.
- A Civilian John Conway is shot dead at the work.
- 24 February – In County Mayo, the National Army capture six Irregulars in Moygownagh, Crossmolina. The Irregulars were digging a trench in the road. The National Army also arrested a 13-year-old boy who was acting as a scout,
- 25 February – Irregulars attack a party of National Troops as they escort eight Irregular prisoners through Mayo. The attack occurred near Claremorris as they were returning to Westport. One National Army Soldier was killed (Corporal Collins) and three were wounded. National Army reinforcements leave from Ballina, but they encounter Irregulars near the Nephin Mountains. One Irregular is wounded and two are captured. Following the engagement, 12 Irregulars are arrested in the Westport Area.
- 26 February – Meeting of Anti-Treaty IRA officers assembles at Ballinageary in County Tipperary. Officers from the First Southern Division report that, "in a short time we would not have a man left owing to the great number of arrests and casualties". Tom Crofts reports that the Cork Brigades have suffered 29 killed and an unknown number captured in recent actions, "if five men are arrested in each area, we are finished". Nevertheless, Liam Lynch takes the opportunity to issue a statement rejecting the possibility of a truce.
- A National Army soldier is executed in Portlaoise for treachery, having defected to and handed over weapons to the Anti-Treaty IRA.
- 27 February – National Army troops surprise an Anti-Treaty column in their dug out at Arigna, County Leitrim. Two Anti-Treaty fighters, James Cull and Patrick Tynan, are killed when their dugout is blown up.
- 28 February –
  - Free State General Denis Galvin dies after the accidental explosion of grenade during a training exercise.
  - Six irregulars from Corballa, near Ballina are arrested. In addition, the National Army arrest a female school teacher called Miss May.
- February – Republicans attack Kenmare, County Kerry, but are driven off.
- February – Free State troops based in Carrick-on-Shannon, including armoured cars and an 18-pounder gun, sweep County Leitrim, searching for a Republican column under Ned Bofin, at least 18 arrests are made.

=== March 1923 ===
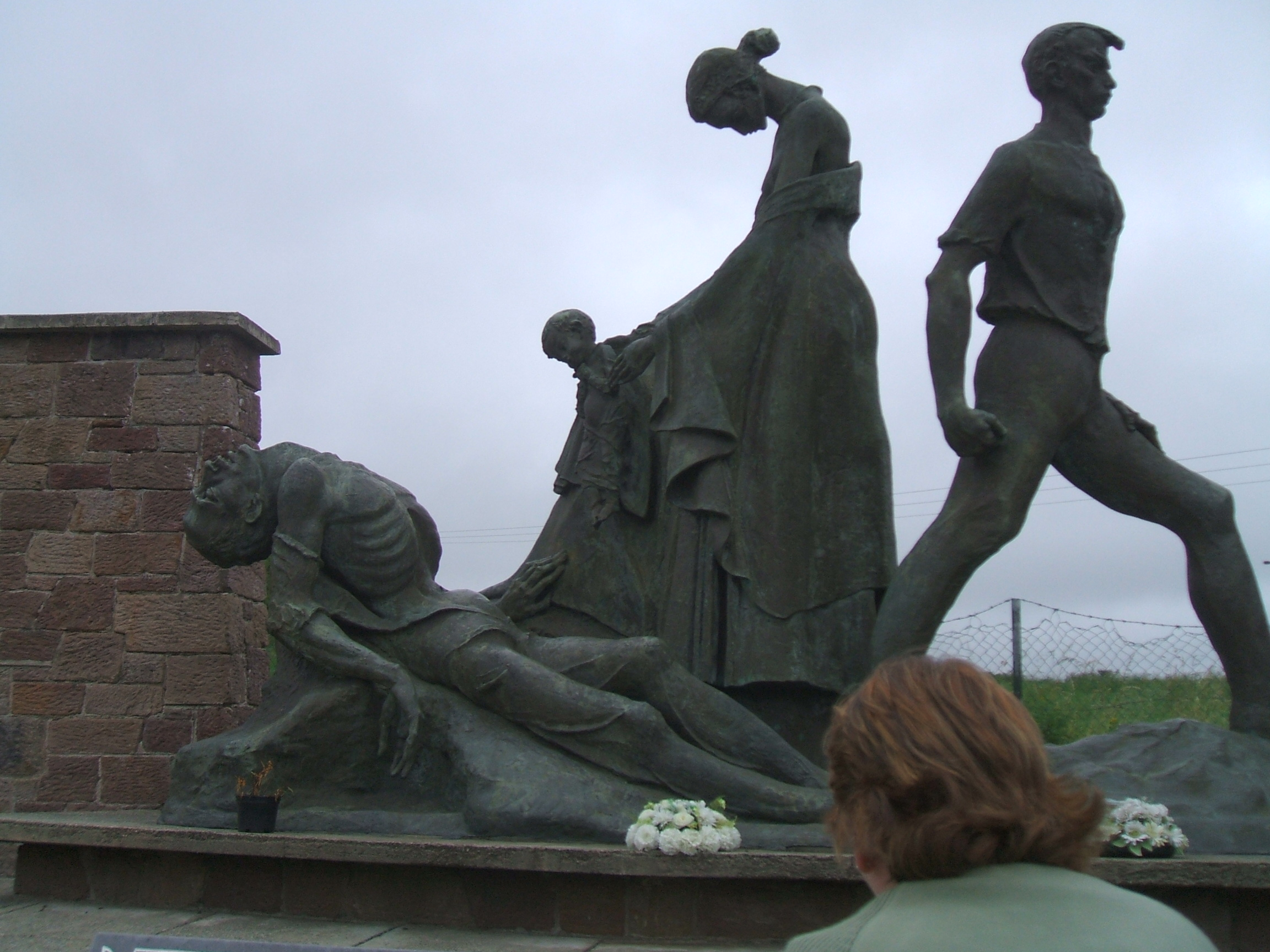
Memorial designed by Yann Goulet to the Republican soldiers killed by Free State troops at Ballyseedy, County Kerry in a mass killing of prisoners on 7 March 1923. The month of March was marked by a series of such atrocities in Kerry

- 2 March – Anti-Treaty IRA officers in North Tipperary, Paddy Ryan Lacken and Seán Gaynor are captured by the Free State.
- 3 March – The body of a National Army sergeant, Thomas McGrath, is found near, Clonmel. Killed by four gunshots. He is reported to the fourth soldier assassinated in the area within a month.
- 5 March – A Free state patrol comes upon a 36-man strong Anti-Treaty column about to attack Cahersiveen, County Kerry. The IRA retreat, fighting a rearguard action against pursuing National Army troops through the Garrane mountains. In the running fights, 3 Free State soldiers killed. Two Republicans, including one Anti-Treaty engineer (Dan Clifford) are killed, allegedly after being wounded and then falling into the hands of the pro-Treaty troops. Another later died of wounds. The National Army claims that three more Anti-Treaty fighters were killed in the action and carried away by their comrades. Six Anti-Treaty men are captured, five of whom are executed on 28 March.
- 6 March – Five Free State soldiers, including three officers are killed by a booby trap mine while clearing a road in Knocknagoshel, County Kerry. Another soldier is badly wounded. National Army commander Paddy Daly issues a memorandum that Republican prisoners are to be used to clear mined roads from now on.
- 7 March – Nine Republican prisoners are taken from Ballymullen Barracks in Tralee to Ballyseedy Cross, ostensibly to clear a mined road. They are then tied together around the landmine, which is then detonated by National army troops. One man, Stephen Fuller, is blown clear by the blast and survives. The eight other prisoners are killed. All of the dead are from IRA Kerry no 1 Brigade. A riot breaks out in Tralee when the troops bring nine coffins back to the town.
- 7 March - On the Countess Bridge in Killarney, a railway bridge, Jer Donoghue, Stephen Buckley, Daniel Donoghue, and Tim Murphy were killed on another mine. Tadhg Coffey survived and escaped. A barracks tailor called Sugrue was later shot; he had befriended the prisoners.
  - A Free State sentry is killed by a sniper outside a barracks in Tralee.
  - Con Moloney, Adjutant General of the Anti-Treaty IRA, is captured by Free State troops at the Glen of Aherlow, County Tipperary, in Moore's Wood, Rossadrehid.
  - In County Mayo, an Anti-Treaty IRA column is surrounded and captured by Free State troops at Buckagh. One IRA man is killed. The remainder are taken to prison in Galway and sentenced to death, but this sentence is not carried out.
  - A CID Officer fires at a 'wanted man' on the corner of Grafton Street and Nassau Street. He hits and mortally wounds civilian George Fitzhenry (67) of Fairview.
- 8 March – Four more Anti-Treaty IRA prisoners are killed in Kerry by National Army troop from Dublin. They are, as at Ballyseedy the day before, blown up by a mine, ostensibly while clearing a mined road, at Countess Bridge in Killarney. The dead are from IRA Kerry 2 Brigade. One man, Tadhg Coffey, escapes the massacre.
  - A Postmaster, Samuel Atkinson, is shot dead by raiders at Lisnalong, County Monaghan.
- 9 March –
  - An anti-Treaty prisoner, Gleeson is shot dead after being taken prisoner by Free State troops near Cloughjordan, County Tipperary.
  - Dublin, A civilian, Patrick Carney, injured by the fire started by anti-Treaty fighters at the income tax offices, Beresford Place, dies at his home in Harold Cross.
- 11 March –
  - A civilian suspected of Republican sympathies is shot dead on Donore Avenue Dublin by Free State Intelligence officers.
  - Kerry, Another Republican prisoner, Seamus Taylor is taken from Kenmare jail to Ballyseedy woods by National Army troops and shot dead.
- 12 March –
  - In County Kerry, Five Republican prisoners (this time from IRA Kerry no. 3 Brigade) are taken from Bahaghs Workhouse where they are imprisoned, and killed at Cahersiveen. They are taken from a National Army post in the town at gunpoint by Dublin Guard officers, under protest from the garrison. The prisoners are then shot in the legs to prevent escape and then blown up by a landmine by National Army troops. Later, the officer from whose charge they were taken, Lieutenant W McCarthy, resigns in protest.
  - One anti-Treaty fighter and one Free State soldier are killed in a gun battle after an attack on Free State post at Rooskey, County Roscommon.
- 13 March –
  - Three Republican prisoners from Wexford IRA units are executed in Wexford town.
  - Three other Republicans are executed, two in Cork (one was a William Healy of the Donoughmore Battalion) and the other in Dublin. The Republican 'government' issues a statement announcing a period of mourning and forbidding all public entertainments such as sporting events while executions of their men continue.
  - A Free State soldier is killed in a gun attack at Glasson, near Athlone.
  - In County Mayo, near Charlestown, a gun battle takes place between the National Army and Irregulars. During the previous night, around 100 Irregulars enter Charlestown, raided some houses and set up a roadblock preventing traffic to Swinford. On 13 March the National Army barracks in Swinford hear about the incident and send troops to investigate. As they approach Charlestown, the patrol is ambushed. In the ensuing gun battle, the National Army suffer two dead. Irregular casualties are one dead and three wounded.
  - The bodies of two civilians are found at Morehill, Tallow on the Waterford/Cork border.
- 14 March –
  - Two Republicans are executed for their part in a bank robbery in Mullingar.
  - Two National Army soldiers are shot and killed in Dublin. One is seized when unarmed and off duty in Portobello and shot in the head. The other is killed in an exchange of fire when he tries to search two republican fighters near Mountjoy Prison.
  - Anti-Treaty IRA officer Charlie Daly and three other Republican fighters are executed by Free State troops at Drumboe Castle, near Stranorlar in County Donegal where they had been held since January. They are executed in reprisal for the death of a Free State soldier in a nearby ambush the day before.
- 15 March –
  - Anti-Treaty officer John Kevins killed in Beaufort, County Kerry.
  - A Free State soldier is shot dead near Wellington Barracks, Dublin.
  - Two soldiers of the Railway protection Corps go missing in County Louth. The body of one is found shot dead.
- 16 March – National Army troops sweep the vicinity of Newport in County Mayo, resulting in some arrests.
- A Free State sweep in County Wexford encounters an anti-Treaty column. One National Army soldier and two republicans are killedi n the fire fight.
- Anti-Treaty fighters explode a bomb at the Customs and Excise Offices in Dublin. One CID man is killed and another wounded.
- 17 March –
  - A major boxing match between Mike McTigue and Battling Siki takes place in Dublin city centre, despite the Anti-Treaty prohibition of public entertainments. A battalion of Free State troops guards the fight on Princes street. Anti-Treaty fighters detonate a mine beside the theater and fire on the spectators after the fight.
  - There is also a bomb attack on the Custom and Excise office in Dublin. One CID man is killed and another is wounded. A National Army Intelligence Officer, Frank Bolster, is shot and wounded while attending the theater in Dublin.
  - Another Free State soldier, John Little, is accidentally shot dead by his comrades in Collins Barracks, Dublin.
- An elderly civilian is shot dead during a Post Office robbery in Monaghan town.
- 19 March – Free State troops of Custume Barracks, Athlone, shoot dead a civilian, John Murphy, they said they were pursuing escaped prisoners.
- 22 March – A fire fight takes place at Windgap on the County Kilkenny–Tipperary border between an IRA column and NA troops from Kilkenny sweeping the area. One NA soldier Vol. Brown is killed and press reports three 'Irregulars' also killed.
- 23 March – A detachment of National Army troops surrounds a house on Albert Road, Dalkey, County Dublin, which contains six Anti-Treaty fighters. One Free State soldier is killed and two wounded when the house is stormed, one Republican is also killed and another is wounded in the fire fight. The remaining four and a woman civilian are arrested. Some arms and hundreds of rounds of ammunition are seized by the Free State troops. In a separate incident, another Anti-Treaty fighter is killed in Rathmines. Another is shot dead trying to blow up the Carlton cinema in O'Connell Street.
- March – In retaliation for the execution of three Wexford Republicans on 13 March, Bob Lambert, the local Republican officer, orders the killing of three National Army soldiers captured while drinking at a pub in the county. The soldiers were taken by Anti-Treaty IRA from a Public House at Ballagh, parish of Adamstown. They were taken to the village of Adamstown where they were shot dead later that night or early next morning, on 24 March 1923. A fourth Free State soldier, John Croke, was badly wounded when he was shot in the leg when he resisted the Anti-Treaty IRA as they initially entered the Pub.
- 23 March –
  - A civilian, Michael Muldoon is shot dead by unknown gunmen Mohill, County Leitrim.
  - National Army troops based in Swinford, County Mayo, arrest an irregular named Halligan from the Kiltimagh area. He was found to be in possession of gelignite, ammunition and a bomb.
- 24 March – Anti-Treaty IRA executive meets in County Waterford to discuss the war's future. Tom Barry proposes a motion to end the war, but it is defeated by 6 votes to 5. Éamon de Valera is allowed to attend, after some debate, but is given no voting rights.
- 25 March –
  - Republican leader in County Leitrim, Ned Bofin and three of his men are captured in the Arigna Mountains.
  - Free State soldiers in Wexford shot dead Michael Furlong (of Ballagh) at Oldcourt, in revenge for the previous days killing of three Free State troops as they suspected that he was an Anti-Treaty IRA member (he had fought in the recent Irish War of Independence in the IRA).
  - A republican prisoner, Murphy is shot dead by Free State troops in Kerry.
- 27 March – William Johnson of IFS Citizens' Defence Force killed by IFS Lt. Frank Teeling; Teeling found guilty of manslaughter and serves 18 months.
- 28 March – Five Republicans who were captured in the Anti-Treaty IRA's 5 March attack on Cahersiveen, County Kerry are executed by firing squad.
- 29 March –
  - Anti-Treaty fighter Bobby Bondfield is arrested on St. Stephen's Green in Dublin by W. T. Cosgrave's CID bodyguards. He is shot dead and dumped in Clondalkin.
- Republicans attempt to burn and lay a land mine in Burton Hall, the home of the Guinness family, one of whom is a senator. The fire fails to ignite and the mine is defused by Free State troops.
  - Press reports that Free State troops have arrested 16 republican fighters around the country.
  - An Anti-Treaty fighter named Murphy is captured near Tralee, and then shot dead by Free State troops, his body is found in Knocknagoshel, County Kerry
- 30 March –
  - Four Anti-Treaty IRA fighters are killed in an action at Kyle in County Wexford, between Wexford town and Enniscorthy. A party of National Army troops was travelling from Wexford to Enniscorthy, heavy machine-gun fire was opened on them, when reinforcements arrived from Wexford Military barracks the fighting had ceased but the reinforcements pursued the attackers, it was during this pursuit that the four men were killed
  - The body of an Anti-Treaty soldier is found on Upper Rathmines Road near Tranquilla Convent Dublin. The body of the deceased had 22 bullet wounds. The jury at the inquest found that Thomas O’Leary had been murdered and that the military authorities were uncooperative. Thomas O’Leary, 22 years old from 17 Armstrong Street Harold's Cross Dublin.
- 31 March –
  - An 80-year-old woman, Mrs Fitzpatrick, is shot dead at her home Longford by republicans who were looking for her son, a Free State officer.
  - In Ballybay, County Monaghan, another civilian, Owen McGuinness, a Treaty supporter, is shot dead by republicans.

=== April 1923 ===
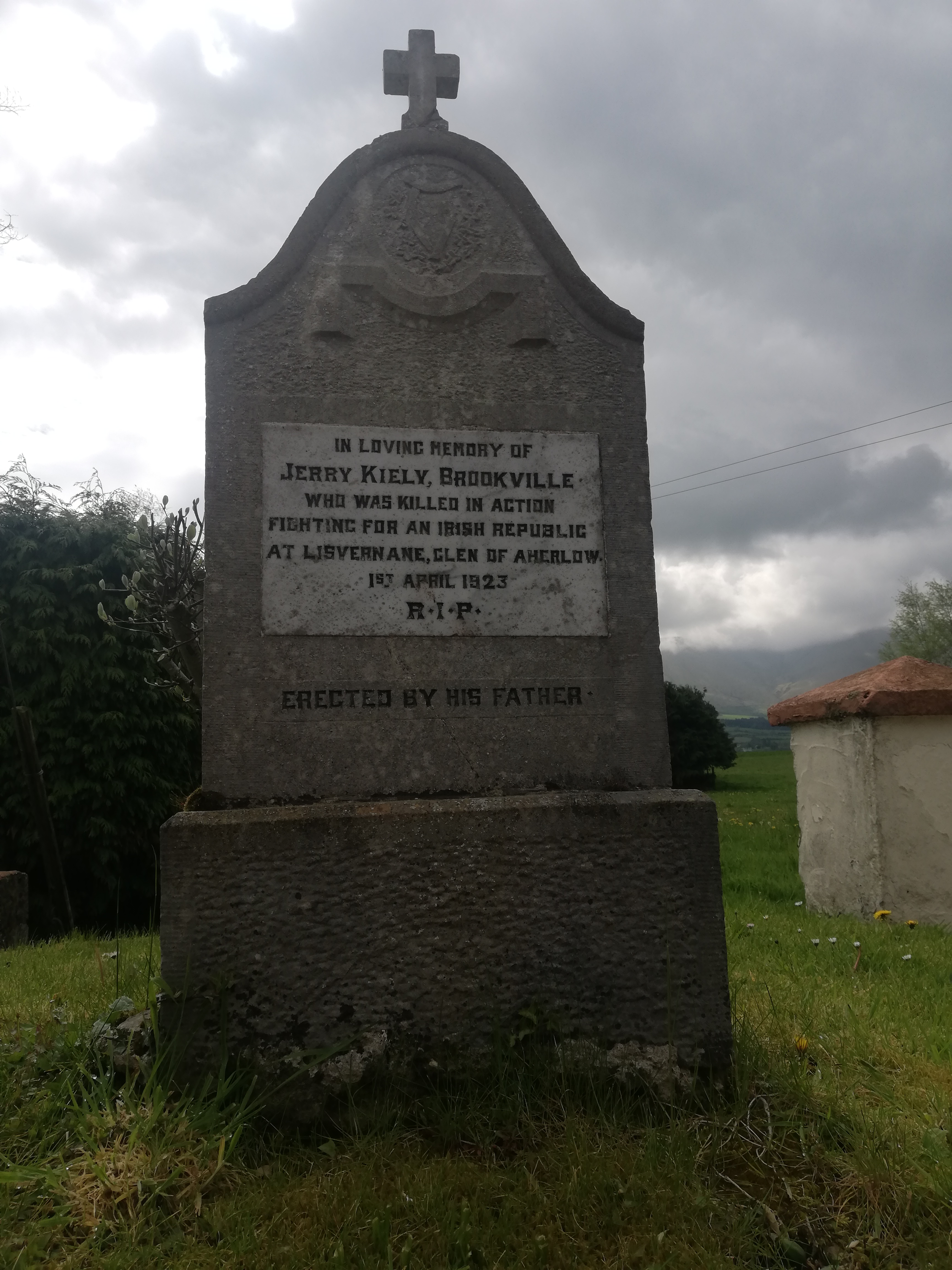
Grave of Jerry Kiely (Anti-Treaty), killed in a raid in the Glen of Aherlow on 1 April 1923

- 1 April – Anti-Treaty IRA men ambush a National Army bicycle patrol on Larkin's Road, in County Louth. One man is killed on either side in the engagement.
- April – National Army troops under General Prout conduct large sweeps of the Knockmealdown Mountains in counties Tipperary and Waterford. They have extracted information from Republican prisoners in Dublin that the IRA Executive is in the area. Prominent Anti-Treaty IRA officers captured in the operation include Dan Breen, Todd Andrews, Seán Gaynor and Frank Barrett. Many other rank and file Republicans are also taken prisoner. Though the Civil War was marked by executions and killings of prisoners, in Prout's command there were only two judicial executions and no 'summary executions'. Republican Mick Sheehan commented, "We may thank Prout that there are so few."
- The Anti-Treaty IRA in Kerry shoot an informer and dump his body near Killorglin. Another civilian informer, a railway worker Cornelius Hannafin, is kidnapped and taken to a remote spot for interrogation.
- A Free State lieutenant and an anti-Treaty fighter are killed in a skirmish in the Glen of Aherlow, County Tipperary.
- 3 April –
  - Anti-Treaty IRA members Christy Breslin and Joseph Kiernan, are arrested by Free State forces at Georges Street, Dublin and killed at Cabra. Another, James Tierney, is killed later.
  - The bodies of two National Army Intelligence officers who were abducted while in plainclothes and unarmed near Barne, County Tipperary on 23 January and killed by Anti-Treaty forces are discovered. Their bodies had been dumped in nearby cemetery.
- Anti-Treaty Volunteer Jerome Lyons is shot dead whilst under interrogation in Kickham Barracks, Clonmel.
- 5 April – Senior Republican leaders Tom Derrig and Moss Twomey are captured by Free State troops on Raglan Road, in Ballsbridge, in Dublin.
- 6 April – In Kerry, Free State troops mount an operation aimed at rescuing Hannafin, an informer held by the Anti-Treaty IRA. They raid a village at Derrynafeana near Carrauntoohil, where he is being held. Three Anti-Treaty fighters are killed in a resulting skirmish and two more captured. The National Army claims a total of nine Anti-Treaty fighters were killed. Most of the IRA column gets away into the mountains. Hannifin is freed. He had previously been made to dig his own grave prior to his imminent execution.
- 9 April – Anti-Treaty fighters cross the Corrib in boats from Oughterard and attack the Free State Army barracks at Headford, County Galway. They detonate a mine against the wall of the barracks and then open fire. The gun battle continues until Free State reinforcements arrive and the irregulars withdraw. The Free State troops lose two soldiers killed and five wounded. Two republicans are killed and more wounded. More Anti-Treaty men are captured in the aftermath of the attack.
- 10 April – Liam Lynch, Republican Commander in Chief, is killed in a skirmish with Free State troops in the Knockmealdown mountains in County Tipperary. He and a group of republicans are caught on a hillside armed only with side-arms and Lynch is shot while attempting to flee. Four more senior Republican officers are captured in the incident. This is part of the same sweep that had captured several other senior republicans a few days earlier. Lynch's death is often cited as the effective end of the war.
- 11 April – Six Republican prisoners are executed by firing squad in Tuam, County Galway.
- Waterford Anti-Treaty IRA Flying Column Leader Tom Keating is mortally wounded. He is transported in a horse and dray and is denied medical attention. The Dungarvan parish priest permits only one mass to be offered for him.
- A National Army report states, "Events of the past few days point to the beginning of the end as a far as the irregular campaign is concerned".
- 12 April – National Army officer in Clonmel barracks shoots dead a prisoner named Jerome Lyons. he allegedly tried to grab the officers revolver while under interrogation
- 13 April – Three republican fighters are surprised and captured in a dug out near Gortaglanna, County Kerry. One is shot dead, the other two are taken prisoner.
- A National Army scout is shot dead in Glenties, County Donegal.
- 14 April –
  - Austin Stack, Deputy IRA Chief of Staff, is captured by Free State troops near Ballymacarbry. He is carrying a document accepting a proposal by the Catholic Bishop of Cashel to end the war by calling a ceasefire and dumping arms.
  - Free-State forces converge on a ruined castle at Castleblake, County Kilkenny after receiving information that it was being used as a dugout by the Republicans. Free State Lieutenant Kennedy calls on the occupants to surrender and fires three shots through the door. A grenade is thrown from inside the shelter, mortally wounding Lieutenant Kennedy. Free-State troops then rush the building. Two republican fighters(Ned Somers and Theo English) are killed in the firefight and several others captured.
  - A 62-year-old woman Bridge Geoghegan is shot dead accidentally by republican guerrillas in Ballybay Monaghan. A weapon discharged when they arrived at her house demanding food and shelter.
- 15 April – A fire-fight between an Anti-Treaty IRA column and Free State troops takes place at Glenvar, County Kerry. The Free State claims that nine Republicans were killed in the action.
- 17 April – Laurence Ginnell, who in December 1922 was appointed by Éamon de Valera as envoy for the anti-Treatyites in the United States, dies in a Washington, D.C. hotel.
- 18 April –
  - Anti-Treaty IRA column under Timothy Lyons (known as "Aeroplane") is surrounded by Free State troops near Kerry Head. They take refuge in caves on the coast. Two Free State soldiers are killed when they try to storm the cave. After three days siege, landmines are lowered over the cave mouths and exploded, killing three Republicans. Lyons is also drowned in the incident. The remaining IRA men surrender. This is the last significant engagement of the civil war in Kerry. Roughly 180 people have been killed in the county, of whom 85 were Free State troops, 72 Anti-Treaty fighters and 12 civilians.
  - Six Anti-Treaty fighters are executed in Tuam County Galway.
- 19 April – Two Anti-Treaty fighters are killed in action at Kealkil, West Cork.
- 20 April – Frank Aiken is elected IRA Chief of Staff.
- 21 April – An Anti-Treaty IRA captain, Martin Hogan, is abducted and killed in Dublin, his body is found in Drumcondra.
- A Free State soldier (Stephen Clancy) is shot dead while patrolling in Ennis, County Clare. An elderly civilian is shot dead during an ambush in Cork City. Another civilian John Melvin is shot dead by the IRA in Ballina, County Mayo as an alleged informer and another government supporter is shot and fatally wounded while in bed.
- 22 April – Free State troops surround Frank Aiken, Padraig Quinn and Sean Quinn, the leaders of the Anti-Treaty forces in the Dundalk area, in a safe house in Castlebellingham. A firefight breaks out in which the two Quinns are wounded, Sean mortally and subsequently captured. In the confusion, Aiken manages to slip away.
- 24 April – Free State troops take a republican prisoner, Daniel Murphy, to Knocknagoshel, where 5 National Army troops had been killed on 6 March and shoot him dead.
- 25 April –
  - Three Anti-Treaty prisoners are executed in Tralee.
  - A National Army officer, Peter McNicholas, is killed in an ambush near Kiltimagh, County Mayo.
  - A Free State Lieutenant, Beehan, is shot dead in an ambush near Castleisland, County Kerry, while escorting two Civic Guards.
- 26 April – One Anti-Treaty fighter is executed in Ennis.
- 30 April – Frank Aiken calls an end to IRA military operations.

=== May 1923 ===
- Early May – 12,000 Republicans have been interned by Free State up to this point.
- First week of May – A major Free State sweep in County Cork takes the last rural areas held by the republicans in the county at Ballyvourney and Ballymakeera. Historian Peter Hart puts the casualties for the civil war in the county at 180 killed and 295 wounded. Of the dead, 70 are National Army, 51 are Anti-Treaty IRA, 28 are civilians and the status of 30 is undetermined.
- 2 May – Two Republican prisoners are executed in Ennis, County Clare.
- 5 May – A civilian Michael Reynolds is shot dead by anti-Treaty republicans in County Leitrim, who were looking for his son, an ex RIC officer.
- Republicans blow up the Grand Central Cinema in Dublin.
- 6 May – A National Army sergeant is shot dead while on sentry duty.
- 14 May – Joint meeting of the Republican Government and IRA Army Executive instructs Aiken to end the war.
- 15 May – Anti-Treaty IRA column surrounded at Valleymount, County Wicklow. Its leader, Ned Plunkett, is killed and the rest surrender.
- 24 May – Frank Aiken orders a ceasefire. Anti-Treaty fighters are to "dump their arms" and return home. Éamon de Valera supports the order, issuing a statement to Anti-Treaty fighters: "Further sacrifice on your part would now be in vain and the continuance of the struggle in arms unwise in the national interest. Military victory must be allowed to rest for the moment with those who have destroyed the Republic". End of the war.

== Aftermath ==
- 30 May – Two Republicans are executed in Tuam, County Galway.

=== June 1923 ===
- 22 June – Michael Radford of the South Wexford Brigade I.R.A. (Anti-Treaty) is shot dead by Free State soldiers at Ballybuick, Tomhaggard, County Wexford.

=== July 1923 ===
- 3 July – Noel Lemass, Anti-Treaty IRA officer in Dublin, brother of Seán Lemass is abducted by Free State plainclothesmen and killed. His body is later found in the Wicklow Mountains on 12 October.

=== August 1923 ===
- 3 August – The body of Henry McEntee was found at Dubber Cross near Jamestown Road Finglas County Dublin. It was alleged that McEntee had received threats from the CID at Oriel House.
- A Civic Guard is shot dead by pro-Treaty troops at Belturbet County Cavan, when he failed to stop at an Army checkpoint.
- 15 August – Éamon de Valera arrested in Ennis, when he tried to make an election speech. He is imprisoned at Kilmainham Jail and Arbour Hill Prison in Dublin until 16 July 1924.
- 17 August – Voting in 1923 Irish general election takes place. Cumann na nGaedheal win 63 seats; Sinn Féin 44; Independents 16; Farmers 15; Labour 14; and Independent Labour 1. About 415,00 first preference votes were given to Pro-Treatyites and 286,000 to Anti-Treatyites. (64% of the electorate voted.) Some of the Anti-Treaty members elected are still imprisoned.
- 18 August – A Free State soldier is accidentally shot dead by his comrades, firing in the air to celebrate the election reulsts in Ballybay, County Monaghan.

=== October 1923 ===
- 13 October – A mass hunger strike is launched by 424 Republican prisoners in Mountjoy Prison in Dublin in protest at their continued detention after the war's end. The strike is joined by up to 8,000 Republican prisoners in prisons and camps around the country.
- 29 October – The Oriel House CID is disbanded and its members transferred to the Dublin Metropolitan Police. In April 1925 the DMP was amalgamated with the Garda Síochána. CID was responsible for a number of killings of republicans during the war.

=== November 1923 ===
- 20 November – Republican prisoner Denny Barry dies on hunger strike in Newbridge camp.
- Two republican prisoners are executed, one in Athlone and one in Tralee.
- 22 November – IRA prisoner Andrew Sullivan dies on hunger strike in Mountjoy prison in Dublin.
- 23 November – The republican hunger strike is called off. The women prisoners are released but most of the men are detained until the following year.

=== December 1923 ===
- 3 December – Garda Síochána Garda Sergeant James Woods murdered in his Garda station after resisting an armed raid by insurgents, Scartaglen, County Kerry.
- 6 December – Scartaglen, County Kerry. Free State Lt. Jeremiah Gaffney shot dead republican Thomas Brosnan in a revenge attack.
- 29 December – Two republicans are executed in Kilkenny.

=== March 1924 ===
- 13 March – Lt. Jeremiah Gaffney was executed for the shooting of Thomas Brosnan.
- 18 March – Army Mutineers assembled in Dublin. The army council resigned affirming the subservience of the military to the civilian government.
- 21 March – An attack on British Soldiers/Sailors and civilians at Queenstown {Cobh} is mounted by Irregulars with Armored car and firing on HMS Scythe; 1 killed and 23 wounded. The Irish Free State paid for compensation for the families of the men killed/wounded in the attack.

=== July 1924 ===
- Last of Republican internees are released.

=== November 1924 ===
- Shots are exchanged between Republicans and Free State troops at the cemetery in Dundalk at the interment of the bodies of six Anti-Treaty fighters executed in January 1923. Several people are hit and one man dies of his wounds.
- 8 November – A general amnesty is declared for acts committed during the civil war.

=== November 1926 ===
- 14 November – Garda Sgt James Fitzsimons in Cork city and Garda Hugh Ward in Hollyford, County Tipperary are murdered in their Garda stations by members of the Anti-Treaty IRA.

== Appendix ==
Statistics are incomplete, Free State government sources stated that between 540 and 800 National Army soldiers were killed in the war. Historian Michael Hopkinson, in Green against Green, pp. 272–3, states "There are no means by which to arrive at even approximate figures for the dead and wounded. Mulcahy stated that around 540 pro-Treaty troops were killed between the Treaty's signing and the war's end; the government referred to 800 army deaths between January 1922 and April 1924. There was no record of overall Republican deaths, which appear to have been very much higher. No figure exists for total civilian deaths."

=== Deaths by date ===
Year	No.
January–June 1922	11
June/July 1922	207–242
August 1922	123
September 1922	122–164
October 1922	48
November 1922	77
December 1922	34
1922	619–696
January 1923	51–75
February 1923	59
March 1923	66–69
April 1923	48–66
May 1923	5
June–December	9
1923	238–265

Total for 1922 and 1923: 857–961.

With additional statistics – fatalities by county available for: Cork 180, Kerry 185, Mayo 88–100, Sligo 54, Offaly 21. Anti-Treaty combatants killed in Clare: 28 (no reliable statistics for pro-Treaty/Civilians). Pro/Anti-Treaty combatants killed between January–June 1922, 9, – 2 in Clare. Casualties in County Kildare, 45 killed. (17 National Army)

Additions,: Kerry + 78, Cork + 120, Sligo + 39, Offaly + 19, Clare + 27, January–June clashes + 7 = 290

Revised total: 1,147-1,251*

A range is given where casualties are reported but not confirmed.

*this is not a definitive total, but rather what could be found in this article.

=== Status of those killed ===
Deaths by status of victim
Status	No.
Civilian*	86
Pro-Treaty	346
Anti-Treaty	596
unknown status	30
Total	1,058

*Civilian casualties, may be far higher, casualties for the Dublin fighting are given as 250, but it is not clear how many of these were killed and how many wounded.

== See also ==
- Timeline of the Irish War of Independence
- Irish Free State offensive
- Executions during the Irish Civil War
