= John T. Prout =

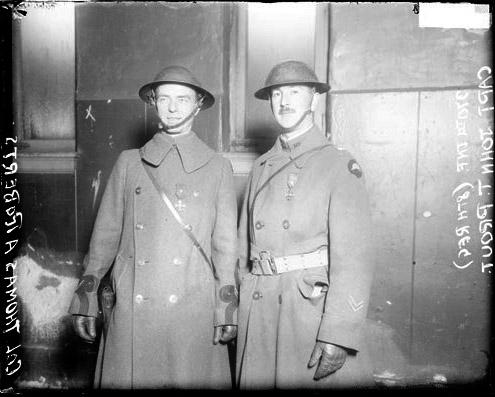
- Colonel Thomas A. Roberts (left) and Captain John T. Prout (right) of 370th infantry, 8th regiment in 1919
- Born: John Thomas Prout; October 25, 1880; Dundrum, County Tipperary, Ireland
- Died: 27 April 1969 (aged 88); Chesterfield, New Hampshire, U.S.
- Burial place: Brattleboro, Vermont, U.S.
- Spouse(s): Catherine Prout (m. 1907-her death); 1 child Mary Conba (m. 1922-19??); 4 (+1 deceased in infancy)
- Military career
- Branch: United States Army; Irish Republican Army; National Army (Ireland)
- Rank: Commandant-general
- Conflicts: First World War; Irish War of Independence; Irish Civil War
- Awards: Croix de Guerre

John T. Prout (October 25, 1880 – April 27, 1969) was an Irish soldier. He served in the United States Army in the First World War, as a training officer in the guerrilla Irish Republican Army during the Irish War of Independence (1919–1921) and held one of the senior commands in the National Army during the Irish Civil War (1922–23).

== First World War ==
Prout was born in Dundrum, County Tipperary in 1880, but emigrated to the United States while still young. After the United States entry into the First World War in 1917, he enlisted at age 36 with the United States 69th Infantry Regiment. He spent five months attached to the French command staff and was awarded the Croix de Guerre.

== Irish War of Independence ==
After the war he returned to Ireland, where he became involved in the agitation for Irish independence and joined the Irish Republican Army. He served as a training and intelligence officer to the Third Tipperary Brigade, based at Galtee Castle.

== Irish Civil War ==
When the IRA split over the Anglo-Irish Treaty in 1922, he sided with the Pro-Treaty side. He subsequently joined the new National Army, where he was given the rank of Commandant General and given command of the southeast, based in Kilkenny. The Civil War, between pro- and anti-Treaty factions, broke out in June 1922.

In July 1922, with a command of 450 men, and an 18 pounder field gun, Prout re-took the city of Waterford from anti-treaty forces after a three-day battle (see Irish Free State offensive). There he recruited 200 more soldiers into the National Army, and received a large shipment of arms by sea from Dublin. His troops also had to keep order in the city in the absence of any other civil power.

Moving on from Waterford, his command proceeded to take the republican held town of Carrick on Suir, after more fighting on August 2, 1922. He went on to take Cashel and Clonmel. After a final stand at Redmondstown, the Anti-Treaty IRA in the south east gave up their fixed positions and took up guerrilla warfare.

The guerrilla war was not as intense in Prout's south-eastern command as elsewhere but his troops came in for considerable criticism for indiscipline and inefficiency. A National Army report of October 1922 stated, "Prout is too weak as well as too guilless to handle traitorous or semi-mutinous incompetents". In December a number of posts under Prout's command, including Carrick on Suir, surrendered to an anti-Treaty column under Tom Barry, giving up their arms and equipment. Commandant General Eamon Price, sent to investigate the incident, backed Prout's plea for more arms and transport for his command and blamed Prout's subordinate officers for the reverse.

In 1923 Prout organised a number of successful operations, which helped to bring the war to an end. In February 1923 he launched a sweep of the Glen of Aherlow, killing republican commander Dinny Lacey and capturing several of his column. In March and April another sweep, of the Knockmealdown Mountains, arrested more anti-Treaty fighters, including several of the general staff, and killed their Commander-in-Chief, Liam Lynch, effectively ending the Civil War, as after Lynch's death the anti-Treaty forces laid down their arms. Nevertheless, his command was criticised by National Army GHQ until after the end of the war for its performance – particularly for its failure to stamp out guerrilla activity in County Wexford.

Though the Civil War was marked by executions and killings of prisoners, in Prout's command there were only two judicial executions and no 'summary executions'. Republican Mick Sheehan commented, "We may thank Prout that there are so few."

== Later life ==
Prout was demobilised from the National Army in June 1924, at a time when he held the rank of Major General. General Richard Mulcahy, Commander in Chief of the Army, criticised the decision: "I think that is a very regrettable matter. Major-General Prout has been made the butt of an attack by a none too sober and none too industrious section here in the country and it is a most disconcerting matter that an officer of Major-General Prout's record and service during the last 18 months or two years finds himself now demobilised."

Tipperary IRB centre Eamon O'Dwyer's witness statement to the Irish Bureau of Military History stated: "The civil war disgusted him and he has been back in the USA for many years." Prout returned to the United States and settled in New York. In 1940, he was technical advisor on the film The Fighting 69th, credited as "Captain John T Prout".

Prout died in 1969 in Chesterfield, New Hampshire and is buried in Brattleboro, Vermont.
