= Graney (surname) =

Graney is a surname. Notable people with the surname include:

- Dave Graney (born 1959), Australian rock musician, singer-songwriter, and author
- Jack Graney (1886–1978), Canadian baseball player
- Pat Graney, American activist and choreographer

== See also ==
- Raney
