= July 1922 =

Month of 1922

<<	July 1922					>>
Su	Mo	Tu	We	Th	Fr	Sa
						1
2	3	4	5	6	7	8
9	10	11	12	13	14	15
16	17	18	19	20	21	22
23	24	25	26	27	28	29
30	31

July 1, 1922: U.S. railroad workers strike begins as 400,000 walk off the job

The following events occurred in July 1922:

== July 1, 1922 (Saturday) ==
- The Great Railroad Strike began in the United States as 400,000 railworkers walked off of the job.
- Construction began on the Country Club Plaza, the world's first regional shopping center, in Kansas City, Missouri. The Plaza opened in 1923.
- James Harvey and Joe Jordan, two African American men tried in absentia on accusations of rape and sentenced to death, were seized by a white mob of about 50 people while being driven by a deputy sheriff through Liberty County, Georgia and lynched. A grand jury indicted 22 men, and four were convicted of murder.
- Five men and a woman on the Spray, a boat on the St. Lawrence River, were drowned when the boat was struck by a larger passenger ship, the Cairndhu, near Sorel, Quebec.
- Born:
  - Shikaripura Ranganatha Rao, Indian archaeologist, claimed to have deciphered the Indus script used by the Indus Valley Civilisation in South Asia between 2600 BC and 1900 BC; in Sagara, Mysore State, British India (now Karnataka state of India) (d. 2013)
  - Toshi Seeger, German-born American environmental activist and Emmy Award-winning documentary producer; as Toshi Ohta, in Munich, Weimar Republic (d. 2013)
- Died: Katherine S. Reed, 41, American screenwriter and playwright, died after a long illness, (b. 1881)

== July 2, 1922 (Sunday) ==
- The derailment of an express train of the Philadelphia & Reading Railroad killed seven people and injured 89 at Winslow Junction, New Jersey.
- Louis James, an American aviator and daredevil, was killed in a horrific accident during an airshow while above 5,000 witnesses in Homewood, Illinois. James was attempting to perform the stunt of climbing down a rope ladder from one airplane and onto another when he was struck by the second aircraft. As The New York Times described it, "James and the ladder were thrown squarely into the propeller of the lower ship, a heavy bar of wood turning at 1,500 revolutions to the minute" and was cut to pieces. His mangled body then fell into the crowd.
- Born: Pierre Cardin, Italian-born French fashion designer; as Pietro Cardin, in San Biagio di Callalta (d. 2020)

== July 3, 1922 (Monday) ==
- Three days of parliamentary elections concluded in Finland. The Social Democratic Party remained the largest in Parliament.
- German journalist and editor Maximilian Harden was stabbed and nearly killed by two right-wing radicals associated with a paramilitary group, the Freikorps.
- Before a crowd of more than 30,000 people at Camp Harding, a temporary encampment of the Gettysburg Battlefield, site of the 1863 Battle of Gettysburg during the American Civil War, the Fourth Brigade of the U.S. Marines staged a large Civil War re-enactment of Pickett's Charge in conjunction with the 59th anniversary of the battle.
- Gerald Chapman, George "Dutch" Anderson, and Charles Loeber, who had teamed up to rob a United States Post Office truck in New York City on October 24, 1921, were located after Chapman had attracted attention by using his share of the loot to live a lavish lifestyle. Chapman was arrested after attempting to sell gold notes from Argentina to a U.S. postal inspector posing as a stock broker. The $2.4 million stolen would be equivalent to $38 million a century later.
- Born:
  - Guillaume Cornelis van Beverloo, Belgian-born Dutch artist; as Cornelis Guillaume van Beverloo, in Liège (d. 2010)
  - David Ward, Scottish opera singer; in Dumbarton, Dunbartonshire (d. 1983)

== July 4, 1922 (Tuesday) ==
- At the Gettysburg Battlefield in Gettysburg, Pennsylvania, a modern version of the 1863 American Civil War battle was staged by the 5th Regiment and 6th Regiment of the U.S. Marines Fourth Brigade before 50,000 people. The Gettysburg Times commented that the war game, presented the day after a re-enactment of the original battle, was "in many respects a simulation of battles fought in the Great World War rather than a reproduction of Pickett's charge," carried out "as the Marines would make it today" with "airplanes, tanks, field artillery, machine guns and Stokes mortars" against a hypothetical U.S. enemy whose troops "had entrenched themselves from the National Cemetery to the Round Tops, including the line which the Union Troops occupied at the time George Pickett made his charge."
- Benny Leonard knocked out Rocky Kansas in the eighth round in Michigan City, Indiana to retain boxing's World Lightweight Title.
- American swimmer Sybil Bauer broke four world records for swimming on the same day in one meet at Brighton Beach in Brooklyn, including 200 meters in 3 minutes, 6 4/5 seconds.
- The city of Jacksonville, Florida inaugurated a program it called "rolling courts" to enforce traffic regulations on the city's Atlantic Boulevard. According to The New York Times, "Justices of the Peace and their bailiffs in the districts traversed by the boulevard... and dozens of deputies in motorcycles and in automobiles were ready to pounce upon any driver who endangered traffic. Upon making an arrest, the deputy and his prisoner proceed until they meet one of the 'rolling courts.' The court stops, gives a preliminary hearing and fixes bond for the appearance of the defendant in Criminal Court. Failure to put up cash bond on the spot results in the taking of the prisoner to Public, where he is held in the city jail."
- A German mail plane flown by German fighter ace Lothar von Richthofen, which was carrying American actress Fern Andra and director Georg Bluen, crashed due to engine failure. Richthofen, the younger brother of Manfred von Richthofen, was killed in the crash but Andra and Bluen survived.
- Born: Father Yod, American spiritual leader, founded "The Source Family" in Los Angeles during the 1960s and early 1970s; as James Edward Baker, in Cincinnati, Ohio (d. 1975)
- Died: Jacques Bertillon, 70, French demographer and statistical analyst, created the Bertillon Classification of Causes of Death system used to determine correlations between socioeconomic conditions and types of death (b. 1851)

== July 5, 1922 (Wednesday) ==
- Elections were held in the Netherlands for the 100-member Tweede Kamer of the Staten-Generaal, the first in which women were allowed to vote. No party got a majority, but the General League of Roman Catholic Caucuses (Algemeene Bond van Roomsch-Katholieke Kiesverenigingen or ABRKK) of Prime Minister Charles Ruijs de Beerenbrouck increased its plurality to almost one-third, winning 32 seats.
- The Tenente revolts began in Brazil, with an uprising of 301 soldiers at Fort Copacabana near Rio de Janeiro. Out of the original 301 rebels, 273 surrendered the next day when offered a chance to leave the fort. The 28 who remained marched toward Rio and were shot by government troops; only four survived. Brazil's Congress voted to impose martial law, with the approval of President Epitácio Pessoa, in order to restore order.
- The Battle of Dublin ended with a total of 65 people killed in a defeat of Irish rebels by the Irish Free State Army at the Granville Hotel on O'Connell Street in Dublin. Near the end, only six anti-treaty fighters remained. Cathal Brugha refused to surrender and was shot and fatally wounded.

== July 6, 1922 (Thursday) ==
- The Brazilian Navy battleship São Paulo fired its 12-inch diameter guns at the rebel-held Fort Copacabana near Rio de Janeiro and forced the surrender of all but 18 of the 301 soldiers and seamen who had seized the fort.
- New York City's Brooklyn Bridge was closed to all motor traffic and horse-drawn vehicles and limited to pedestrians due to two large suspension cables beginning to slip. The bridge would remain closed for almost three years as repairs would be made, not reopening until May 12, 1925.
- Eleven people in Soviet Russia were condemned to death for interfering with the state confiscation of church property.
- Born: William Schallert, American character actor best known for his role in The Patty Duke Show; in Los Angeles (d. 2016)
- Died: Sir John Sandys, 78, English classical scholar (b. 1844)

== July 7, 1922 (Friday) ==
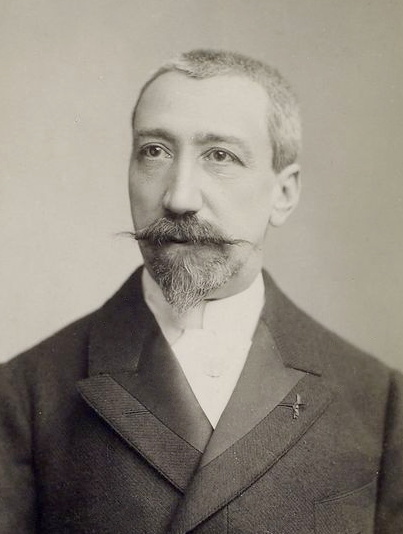
Anatole France

- The Vatican placed the works of French author Anatole France on the list of books that Catholics were forbidden to read.
- Lawrence K. Marshall, Vannevar Bush, and Charles G. Smith founded the American Appliance Company, initially to manufacture refrigerators that would run more quietly, but then moved into electronics to market Smith's invention, the voltage-regulator tube, that could convert alternating current used in home electricity to a regulated, high voltage direct current. The company was renamed as the Raytheon Manufacturing Company in 1925.
- Born:
  - Chandrashekhar, Indian actor and filmmaker; as Chandrashekhar Vaidya, in Hyderabad, British India (now in India's Telangana state) (d. 2021)
  - Robert Raymond, Australian television producer and journalist, co-founder of the news program Four Corners, which has run on the Australian Broadcasting Corporation network since August 19, 1961; in Canungra, Queensland (d. 2003)
- Died:
  - Cathal Brugha, 47, the Minister for Defence of Ireland from 1919 until his death and a supporter of the anti-treaty faction of Sinn Féin, died three days after being fatally wounded by an Irish Free State soldier in Dublin. (b. 1874)
  - Ioannis Svoronos, 59, Greek archaeologist and numismatist (b. 1863)

== July 8, 1922 (Saturday) ==
- Muhammad VI al-Habib, commonly known as "Habib Bey", became the new Bey of Tunis, the monarch of the French protectorate of Tunisia in North Africa, upon the death of his first cousin, Muhammad V an-Nasir ("Naceur Bey"), who had ruled since 1906. Habib Bey would reign until 1929.

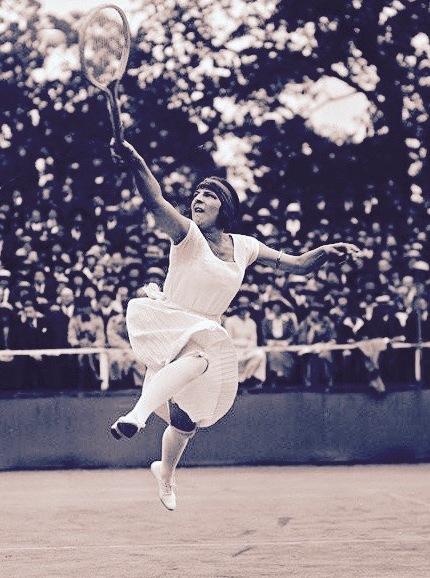
Lenglen in 1922

- Elections to the Upper House of the Althing (the Efri deild) were held in Iceland for the six seats that had previously been filled by appointment. The other 14 representatives' seats had been selected directly by the voters in prior elections in 1916 and 1919.
- The lone aircraft of the Army of Paraguay, an Armstrong Whitworth F.K.8 biplane, was shot down over Pirayú while on a bombing mission against rebels in the Paraguayan Civil War. Paraguayan pilot Francisco Cusmanich and British mechanic Sidney J. Stewart were killed in the crash. They had been conducting bombing missions since June 29, and had killed and injured prisoners of war while bombing a train on July 3.
- The government of Chile agreed to a proposal by Peru to request American arbitration of the boundary dispute over the Arica Province of Chile, and the Department of Tacna of Peru, occupied by Chilean troops since 1885.
- Suzanne Lenglen of France defeated Molla Mallory in straight sets, 6–2 and 6–0 to win the Ladies' Championship at Wimbledon for the fourth straight year.
- Born: John Prip, American metalsmith; in New York City (d. 2009)

== July 9, 1922 (Sunday) ==
- All 29 people on the British cargo ship SS El Kahira died when the ship sank in a storm, two days after it had departed from London to reach the French Algerian port of Algiers. A subsequent British inquiry discovered that El Kahira was not seaworthy at the time of its departure, having gone uninspected for two years, lacking a wireless transmitter, powered by defective boilers and having only four of its six lifeboats actually working.
- American athlete Johnny Weissmuller became the first man to swim 100 metres in less than a minute, covering the distance in 58.6 seconds.
- The government of France hosted a visit of 27 African tribal leaders who were "sovereigns of various French colonies or protectorates in the Sudan, Senegal, Dahomey, Mauretania and the Ivory and Guinea coasts." The visitors included King Baloum Naha of Togo and King Adadji Abdoukane of Senegal, and each leader was accompanied by two or more wives.
- The Australasian bent-wing bat was discovered by British naturalist Oriana Wilson, who caught the animal in Australia near the port of Darwin. British zoologist Oldfield Thomas, who first described the bat as a new species, gave it the scientific name Miniopterus orianae in her honor.
- Born: Sir Phillip Bridges, British lawyer, served as Attorney General and later the Chief Justice of the Gambia; in Bedford, Bedfordshire (d. 2007)

== July 10, 1922 (Monday) ==
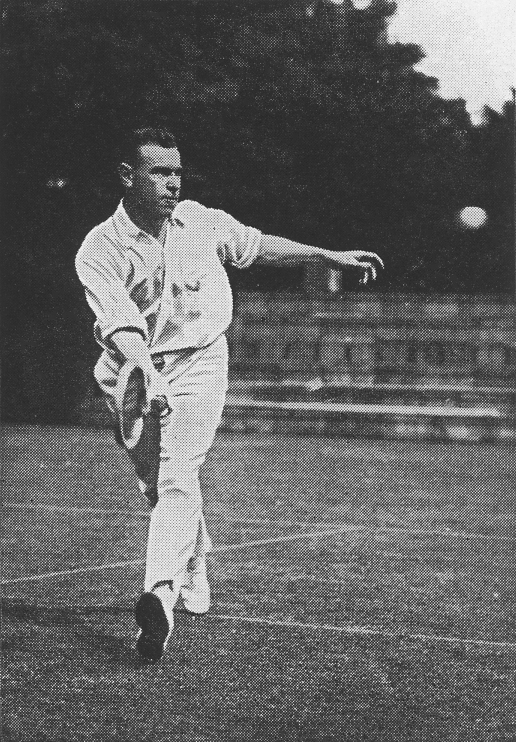
Gerald Patterson

- The Negev, a desert area in the Middle East and formerly part of the Ottoman Empire, inhabited mostly by Palestinian Arabs and historically part of what is now the Kingdom of Jordan, was conceded by British administrator Jack Philby to become part of Mandatory Palestine, rather than to the Emirate of Transjordan. In 1947, when Palestine was being divided to form a Jewish state, the Negev (including Beersheba and Eilat) would be assigned to what would become the nation of Israel.
- Gerald Patterson of Australia defeated Randolph Lycett of the United Kingdom in the Gentlemen's Singles Final at Wimbledon.

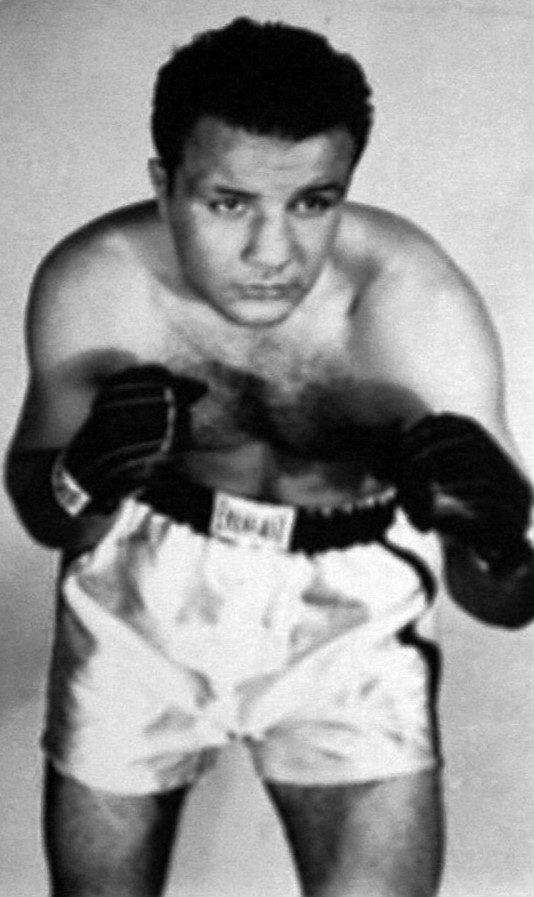
Jake LaMotta

- Joe Lynch regained boxing's World Bantamweight Title with a 14th-round knockout of Johnny Buff in New York.
- Born:
  - Jake LaMotta, American professional boxer and former middleweight world champion who was the subject of the 1980 film Raging Bull; as Giacobbe LaMotta, in Manhattan, New York City (d. 2017)
  - Nell Blaine, American landscape, expressionist and watercolor painter; in Richmond, Virginia (d. 1996)

== July 11, 1922 (Tuesday) ==
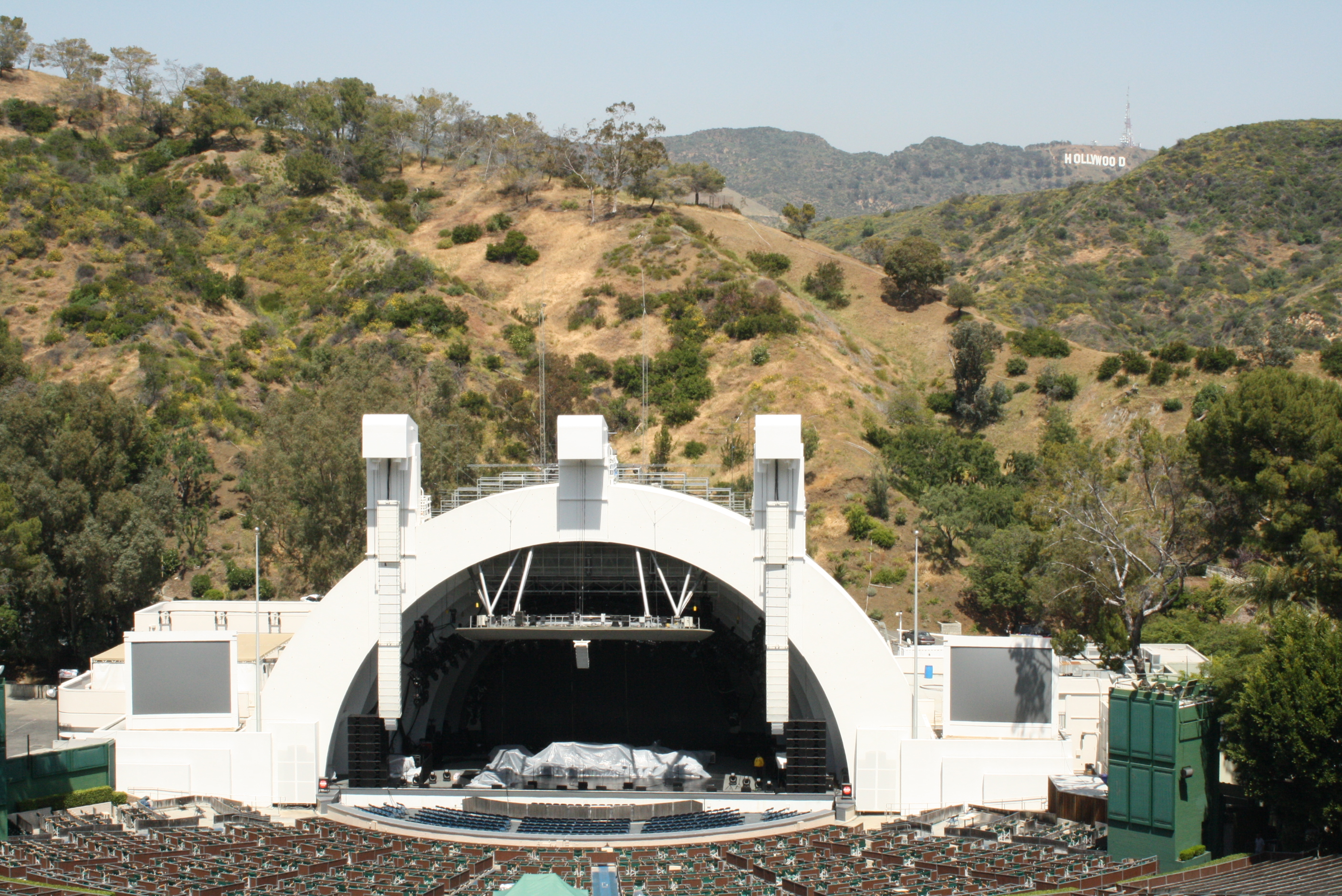
The Hollywood Bowl

- The Hollywood Bowl amphitheatre had its official opening in Hollywood, California with a performance by the Los Angeles Philharmonic orchestra.
- U.S. President Warren G. Harding intervened in the nationwide railroad strike issued a proclamation and declared: "Whereas, The maintained operation of the railways in interstate commerce and the transportation of the United States mails have necessitated the employment of men who choose to accept employment... and Whereas the peaceful settlement of controversies in accordance with law and due respect for the established agencies of such settlement are essential the security and well-being of our people" all railroad employees and employers were directed "to refrain from all interference with the lawful efforts to maintain interstate transportation and the carrying of the United States mails."
- The U.S. state of Montana got its first licensed radio station, KFBB out of Great Falls.
- Born: Jerald terHorst, American journalist who served as the 14th White House Press Secretary during the first month of Gerald Ford's presidency, resigned in protest over President Ford's pardon of former President Nixon; in Grand Rapids, Michigan (d. 2010)
- Died: Hans Irvine, 65, Australian vigneron, winemaker and politician, died following an operation. (b. 1856)

== July 12, 1922 (Wednesday) ==
- Field Marshal Fevzi Çakmak resigned as Prime Minister of Turkey and was replaced by Rauf Orbay.
- While visiting the White House as the guest of U.S. President Harding, Canadian Prime Minister William Lyon Mackenzie King proposed to modernize and make permanent the century-old Rush-Bagot Treaty with the United States.
- Germany formally asked the Allied Reparations Commission to extend the moratorium on German reparations payments to all of 1923 and 1924.
- Eight children, ranging in age from 12 to 15, were killed in Watertown, New York by the explosion of a three-inch diameter artillery shell that had been fired a year earlier by the U.S. Army's 106th Heavy Artillery regiment. Investigators learned that one of the victims, Anson Workman, had found the shell on the Pine Plains Army Reservation and then took it back to the Dimmick Street duplex where he lived. The children had been playing croquet and police concluded that one of them had pounded on the live shell with a croquet mallet.
- Born:
  - Mark Hatfield, American politician, served as Governor of Oregon from 1959 to 1967 and as the U.S. Senator from Oregon from 1967 to 1997; in Dallas, Oregon (d. 2011)
  - Govinda Bahadur Malla, Nepalese novelist; in Kathmandu (d. 2010)
  - Heinz Sachsenberg, German World War II fighter ace who served in the Luftwaffe, recipient of the Knight's Cross of the Iron Cross; in Dessau, Weimar Republic (d. 1951)
- Died:
  - Admiral John Moresby, 92, British naval officer and explorer, namesake of Port Moresby in Papua New Guinea (b. 1830)
  - George Washington Steele, 82, American lawyer and politician, served as the first Governor of the Oklahoma Territory and as the U.S Representative from Indiana from 1881 to 1889 and 1895 to 1903 (b. 1839)

== July 13, 1922 (Thursday) ==
- The Kingdom of Serbs, Croats and Slovenes, which would officially change its name to Yugoslavia in 1929, received official recognition as a sovereign nation from the Conference of Ambassadors of the Principal Allied and Associated Powers.
- The directors of the Bank of England reduced the interest rate on loans to 3% per annum, the pre-war figure.
- Born:
  - Anker Jørgensen, Danish politician, served as the Prime Minister of Denmark from 1972 to 1973 and 1975 to 1982; in Copenhagen (d. 2016)
  - Leslie Brooks, American film actress; as Virginia Gettman, in Lincoln, Nebraska (d. 2011)
  - Ken Mosdell, Canadian ice hockey player; in Montreal (d. 2006)

== July 14, 1922 (Friday) ==
- French President Alexandre Millerand survived an assassination attempt when anarchist Gustave Bouvet fired two revolver shots at an open carriage that he thought was carrying Millerand. A bystander grabbed Bouvet's arm during the shooting, and a crowd subdued the 23-year-old anarchist.
- The New York Zoo received the first and only platypus in the United States, the only surviving specimen of five that had been brought from Australia by Ellis S. Joseph and Henry Burrell on a journey that had started on May 12. Four of the five animals died before Joseph and Burrell arrived in San Francisco on June 30. The platypus survived only 49 days after its arrival at the zoo, dying on September 1.
- The Hague economic conference ended without an agreement.
- Born: Peter Tranchell, British composer; in Cuddalore, British India (now in India's Tamil Nadu state) (d. 1993)

== July 15, 1922 (Saturday) ==
- The Japanese Communist Party (日本共産党 or Nihon Kyōsan-tō) was founded by three former anarchists, Katsuzō Arahata, Toshihiko Sakai and Hitoshi Yamakawa. The JCP would be outlawed on April 22, 1925, with the passage of the Peace Preservation Law and would not become legal again until 1945.
- Italian Fascists led by Roberto Farinacci occupied several cities where the municipal government was led by the Social Communist Party and forced the local governments to resign. In addition to Cremona in Lombardy, the villages of Viterbo and Alatri in Lazio were attacked as well.
- The first fully-automated telephone exchange in the United Kingdom, using a public relay system that bypassed the need for a person operating a switchboard, was installed in the English town of Fleetwood, Lancashire. It would remain in service until 1959.
- Gene Sarazen won the U.S. Open golf tournament.
- Born:
  - Leon M. Lederman, American experimental physicist and Nobel Prize laureate; in New York City (d. 2018)
  - Kadri Hazbiu, Albanian politician, served as the Minister of Internal Affairs and chief of Albania's secret police, the Sigurimi, during Communist rule from 1954 to 1980; in Mavrovë, Principality of Albania (executed 1983)

== July 16, 1922 (Sunday) ==
- The blue, black and white Flag of Estonia was adopted as the national banner by the Estonian government.
- Irish nationalist Frank Aiken was arrested by pro-treaty troops and imprisoned at Dundalk Gaol. He escaped the next day, along with 100 other men.
- Felice Nazzaro won the French Grand Prix.
- Born: Mary Russell Vick, English field hockey player and sports administrator, led the All England Women's Hockey Association from 1976 to 1986; as Mary de Putron, in Guernsey (d. 2012)

== July 17, 1922 (Monday) ==
- The assassins of German Foreign Minister Walther Rathenau on June 24 were cornered by police at hideout in Saaleck Castle near Bad Kösen. Mechanical engineer Hermann Fischer committed suicide. Retired naval officer Erwin Kern was shot and fatally wounded while attempting to flee.
- In Germany, the Darmstadt Bank of Trade and Industry and the National Bank and merged to create the Danatbank.
- The signing of "Treaty 11" (the eleventh and final treaty between Canada and the First Nations governments) took place at Fort Liard in Canada's Northwest Territories.
- The Sheriff of Brooke County, West Virginia, was killed along with six coal miners by gunfire during an attack on the Richland Mining Company's tipple at Cliftonville and the 90-minute gun battle that followed. Sheriff H. H. Duval was shot seven times while leading an attempt to defend the attack.
- Born: John P. Flynn, American lieutenant general in the U.S. Air Force who served in World War II, the Korean War, and the Vietnam War, he was the highest-ranking American prisoner of war during the Vietnam War; in Cleveland (d. 1997)

== July 18, 1922 (Tuesday) ==
- Edwina Ashley and Lord Louis Mountbatten were married at St Margaret's, Westminster, London in the society wedding of the year.
- The U.S. state of Kentucky's first radio station, WHAS out of Louisville, went on the air.
- Raghunathrao Shankarrao Gandekar was crowned as the Raja of Bhor, a princely state of British India (now in the Maharashtra state). During his 29-year reign, the Raja implemented multiple reforms in Bhor, including representative government, freedom of association and the abolition of discrimination against Indians of the Dalit caste who had been labeled as "untouchable." He signed the Instrument of Accession to join Bhor with the Dominion of India in 1948, bringing an end to the separate existence of the princely state.
- Born: Thomas Kuhn, American physicist, historian and philosopher of science; in Cincinnati, Ohio (d. 1996)
- Died: Charles Ransom Miller, 73, American journalist and editor, served as the editor-in-chief of The New York Times from 1883 until his death (b. 1849)

== July 19, 1922 (Wednesday) ==
- Italy's Prime Minister Luigi Facta and his cabinet resigned after losing a resolution of no confidence in the Chamber of Deputies, which voted 288 to 103 against the government.
- The National Athletic and Cycling Association of Ireland, which would govern all amateur sports in Ireland by a merger of the Irish Amateur Athletic Association (IAAA) and the Gaelic Athletic Association (GAA).
- A riot by inmates of the Penitentiary of New Mexico, done to protest overcrowding, poor food and excessive force by authorities, was ended when prison guards fired into the crowd of inmates after they ignored a command to return to their cells. Six inmates were wounded, one fatally, and the subsequent state investigation faulted the prison administration for its lack of training or experience in controlling a prison population.
- Born:
  - George McGovern, American politician and diplomat, served as U.S. Senator for South Dakota and was the unsuccessful Democratic Party nominee in the 1972 U.S. presidential election; in Avon, South Dakota (d. 2012)
  - Jaafar of Negeri Sembilan, Malay monarch, Yang di-Pertuan Agong of Malaysia from 1994 to 1999; in Klang, British Malaya (d. 2008)
  - Vladimir Serov, Soviet Air Force flying ace who downed 29 enemy planes during World War II; in Kurganinsk, RSFSR, Soviet Union (d. killed in action, 1944)

== July 20, 1922 (Thursday) ==
- Several areas of Africa, former German colonies that had been ceded after Germany's loss in World War I, were formally transferred to the administration of other European powers under the League of Nations mandate system as "Class B mandates". Kamerun was divided between the French Cameroons (which became Cameroon) and the British Cameroons (now divided between Cameroon and Nigeria). Togoland was split into French Togoland (now the Republic of Togo) and British Togoland (now the Volta Region of the eastern part of the Republic of Ghana). German East Africa was divided into the British Tanganyika Territory (now part of Tanzania) and the Belgian-administered Ruanda-Urundi (now the nations of Rwanda and Burundi.
- The city of Limerick, taken earlier by the Irish Republican Army, fell to the Irish Free State Army, with casualties of 20 people.
- The Irish National Army began bombardment of IRA-held city of Waterford with artillery shells.
- Born:
  - Alan S. Boyd, American attorney and transportation executive, served as the first United States Secretary of Transportation from 1967 to 1969 and later the President of Illinois Central Railroad and Amtrak; in Jacksonville, Florida (d. 2020)
  - Ruth Bidgood, Welsh poet; as Ruth Jones, in Seven Sisters, Neath Port Talbot, West Glamorgan (d. 2022)
- Died:
  - Andrey Markov, 66, Russian mathematician, namesake of the Markov chain in probability theory (b. 1856)
  - John Goucher, 77, American Methodist pastor and co-founder of the Women's College of Baltimore City, now Goucher College, died of anemia. (b. 1845)

== July 21, 1922 (Friday) ==
- In response to the assassination of Foreign Minister Walther Rathenau by terrorists, Germany's Reichstag enacted the Law for the Protection of the Republic (Republikschutzgesetz), which outlawed organizations that attempted to undermine the constitutionally established republican form of government. Its scope included the right-wing terror group Organisation Consul, which was responsible for Rathenau's assassination, and authorized the arrest of its members.
- Film actress ZaSu Pitts filed for bankruptcy.
- A limited commercial license was issued for operating radio station WIAE, in Vinton, Iowa, to station manager Marie Zimmerman, making WIAE the first radio station owned and operated by a woman.
- Born: Mollie Sugden, English actress and comedian, known for her role in Are You Being Served?; as Isabel Mary Sugden, in Keighley, Yorkshire (d. 2009)
- Died:
  - Djemal Pasha, 50, Ottoman military leader and war criminal, served as the Ottoman Empire Navy Minister from 1914 to 1918, was assassinated in retaliation for his role in the Armenian genocide. (b. 1872)
  - Swami Turiyananda, 59, Indian Hindu mystic and missionary, one of the earliest Hindu missionaries to travel to the United States to teach the Vedanta philosophy (b. 1863)

== July 22, 1922 (Saturday) ==
- The British Malayan Petroleum Company, which would transform the small sultanate of Brunei into one of the world's wealthiest nations, was formed to drill for oil, which would first be found on April 5, 1929.
- Germany formally announced the acceptance of a plan for Allied control of German finances in which they would personally supervise almost all the country's financial departments.
- The Sporting Globe, Australia's national sports newspaper, published its first issue. It would continue for 74 years until discontinuing on September 2, 1996.
- The 96-year-old Manchester Times, which began publishing in 1828, published its final issue.
- The U.S. state of Delaware got its first licensed radio station, WHAV in Wilmington.
- Born: Julia Farron, English ballerina; as Joyce Margaret Farron-Smith; in London (d. 2019)
- Died:
  - Jōkichi Takamine, 67, Japanese chemist known for being the first person to isolate epinephrine in 1901, the life-saving medication that synthesized the hormone adrenaline (b. 1854)
  - Sara Jeannette Duncan, 60, Canadian novelist and journalist, died of chronic lung disease. (b. 1861)
  - Eduardo Zerega, 62, American entertainer who performed worldwide with his mandolin and guitar ensemble, Zerega's Spanish Troubadours (b. 1860)

== July 23, 1922 (Sunday) ==
- Firmin Lambot of Belgium won the Tour de France.
- The Boston Red Sox made a controversial trade with the New York Yankees. Joe Dugan and Elmer Smith went to the Yankees in exchange for $50,000 and an assortment of mediocre players, which caused complaints around the league that Red Sox owner Harry Frazee was habitually selling off his top talent to the Yankees in order to line his own pockets.

== July 24, 1922 (Monday) ==
- The League of Nations approved the establishment of a French mandate over the Syrian states and a mandate over Palestine for Great Britain.

== July 25, 1922 (Tuesday) ==
- The radio station WBAY went on the air as the first commercial broadcasting station. One author notes that "WBAY's role in the history of radio is beyond its longevity, for it was on the air less than three weeks," but the first to sell airtime for use by any member of the public— $40 for 15 minutes during the day, and $50 for 15 minutes in the evening. WBAY's location in the AT&T building in New York City filled its 500-watt broadcast signal with static from the heavy volume of telephone calls and the transmitter closed on August 16, and "never sold a minute of airtime." The staff was then transferred to the existing WEAF station, which sold commercials in August.
- The Battle of Kilmallock began in County Limerick in Ireland as troops of the Irish Free State army recaptured the city of Limerick from the Irish Republican Army and then moved into the countryside to retake towns from the IRA. The fighting over the next 12 days was one of the largest engagements of the Irish Civil War. IRA forces were gone from County Limerick by August 5.
- Born: James M. Early, American electrical engineer known for his innovations in transistors; in Syracuse, New York (d. 2004)

== July 26, 1922 (Wednesday) ==
- The Provisional Government of Southern Ireland suspended all sessions of the Dáil Courts, which had been established by Irish nationalists in 1920.
- The British government rejected a proposal from the United States requesting the right to search British vessels outside the three-mile limit suspected of smuggling liquor into America.
- American League President Ban Johnson suggested that the baseball trading deadline be moved up to July 1 from August 1 to cut down on lopsided deals like the one recently made between the Boston Red Sox and New York Yankees.
- Born:
  - Hoyt Wilhelm, American professional baseball player and Baseball Hall of Fame inducteein Huntersville, North Carolina (d. 2002)
  - Chitrabhanu, Indian Jainist religious author and leader, founded JAINA in 1981; as Rup–Rajendra Shah, in Rajputana, India (d. 2019)
- Died: Annie Robe, 60, English-born American stage actress

== July 27, 1922 (Thursday) ==
- In the largest jailbreak in Europe up to that time, 105 men escaped from Dundalk Gaol after the Fourth Northern Division of the Irish Republican Army used dynamite to make a hole in the wall. Led by John McCoy, the IRA men captured the garrison of the prison at Dundalk, County Louth and seized its weapons.
- Oscar Traynor and a number of other IRA officers were arrested by the government.
- Adolf Hitler was released from Munich Stadelheim Prison after serving a month of his 100-day sentence.
- Adyghe Autonomous Oblast was created within the Russian SFSR.
- Born: Norman Lear, American television writer and producer, known for creating All in the Family and Sanford and Son; in New Haven, Connecticut (d. 2023)

== July 28, 1922 (Friday) ==
- The United States established diplomatic relations with Latvia, Lithuania and Estonia, the three "Baltic states" that bordered Russia. Evan E. Young was named as the first ambassador to all three nations.
- The Emir Idris as-Senussi of Cyrenaica, a North African colony of Italy, was installed by the Italian colonial authorities as the new Emir of Tripolitania to lead the native residents there, while Italy managed the domestic affairs of the two colonies through a governor. In 1934, Cyrenaica and Trioplitania would be formally merged with Fezzan as the colony of Libya under the nominal rule of Idris, who would become the first (and last) King of Libya, ending his 59-year reign with his overthrow in the al-Fateh Revolution of 1969.
- Sir Adam Beck announced plans for a $100 million expansion of Canada's hydroelectric power plants at Niagara Falls.
- Born:
  - William Coblentz, American attorney at law who represented numerous celebrities; in Santa Maria, California (d. 2010)
  - Gwen Kelly, Australian novelist; as Gwen Smith, in Thornleigh, New South Wales (d. 2012)

== July 29, 1922 (Saturday) ==
- Germany's currency, the German mark, hit a new low of less than one-sixth of a penny, or 650 marks to one American dollar, after starting the day at 600 marks and dropping in value another 8 percent within hours. At the same time, the collapse of the currency of one of the former Central Powers of World War One was continuing to spread in Hungary where the korona ("crown") continued its two-week downward slide to drop in value. The crown (originally old Austro-Hungarian Empire notes stamped with a label) had gone from 800 per U.S. dollar to 2,000 per dollar, with commensurate 250 percent price rises in since mid-July.
- The short animated film Little Red Riding Hood, produced and directed by Walt Disney, was released.
- Oil was discovered near the small town of Smackover, Arkansas, when the Richardson Number 1 well, located four miles north on the land of Charles Richardson, erupted in a gusher. Within a few months, the town of 100 people had over 25,000 coming in to seek their fortune. By 1930, the population was down to a little more than 2,500.
- Born:
  - Howard W. Bergerson, American writer known for his mastery of wordplay, including the longest palindrome in the English language; in Minneapolis (d. 2011)
  - Marguerite Primrose Gerrard, Jamaican-born American botanical artist; as Marguerite Primrose Tyndale-Biscoe (d. 1993)
- Died: Raphael Morgan, 55-56, Jamaican-American priest, believed to be the first Black Eastern Orthodox priest (b. 1866)

== July 30, 1922 (Sunday) ==
- The Irish National Army (fighting for the Irish Free State) took the towns of Tipperary (in County Tipperary and Buncrana in County Donegal.
- Marilyn Miller and Jack Pickford were married in Los Angeles.
- Born:
  - Henry W. Bloch, American accountant and bookkeeper, co-founder of the H&R Block company; in Kansas City, Missouri (d. 2019)
  - Bernard Kaukas, Chief Architect for British Railways from 1968 to 1977; in Hackney, London (d. 2014)

== July 31, 1922 (Monday) ==
- Six diners died of arsenic poisoning, and more than 50 others needed hospital treatment, after having eaten dessert at the Shelburne Restaurant at 1127 Broadway Street in New York. The victims, ranging in age from 17 to 62, were all on lunch break from their jobs. While the baker was initially arrested, he was released after a determination that the arsenic had been in the dough made by another person for the pie crust.
- Socialist-led unions in Italy held a 24-hour general strike in an effort to pressure Luigi Facta's government to do more to stop Fascist violence. Few workers participated, however, leaving the Socialists discredited and the Fascists even more emboldened.
- The musical stage comedy Little Nellie Kelly, with music and lyrics by George M. Cohan, premiered at the Tremont Theatre in Boston.
- The Rex Ingram-directed adventure film The Prisoner of Zenda premiered at the Astor Theatre in New York City.
- Born:
  - Bill Kaysing, American writer and conspiracy theorist, known for first advancing the Moon landing conspiracy theory; in Chicago (d. 2005)
  - Hank Bauer, American professional baseball player and manager; as Henry Albert Bauer, in East St. Louis, Illinois (d. 2007)
