= The Queen of Spades (story) =

1834 novella by Alexander Pushkin

The Queen of Spades (Russian: «Пиковая дама», romanized: Pikovaya dama) is an 1834 novella with supernatural elements by Alexander Pushkin, about human avarice. Written in autumn 1833 in Boldino, it was first published in the literary magazine Biblioteka dlya chteniya in March 1834.

The story served as basis for the operas The Queen of Spades (1890) by Pyotr Ilyich Tchaikovsky, La dame de pique (1850) by Fromental Halévy and Pique Dame (1864) by Franz von Suppé, and numerous films.

== Synopsis ==
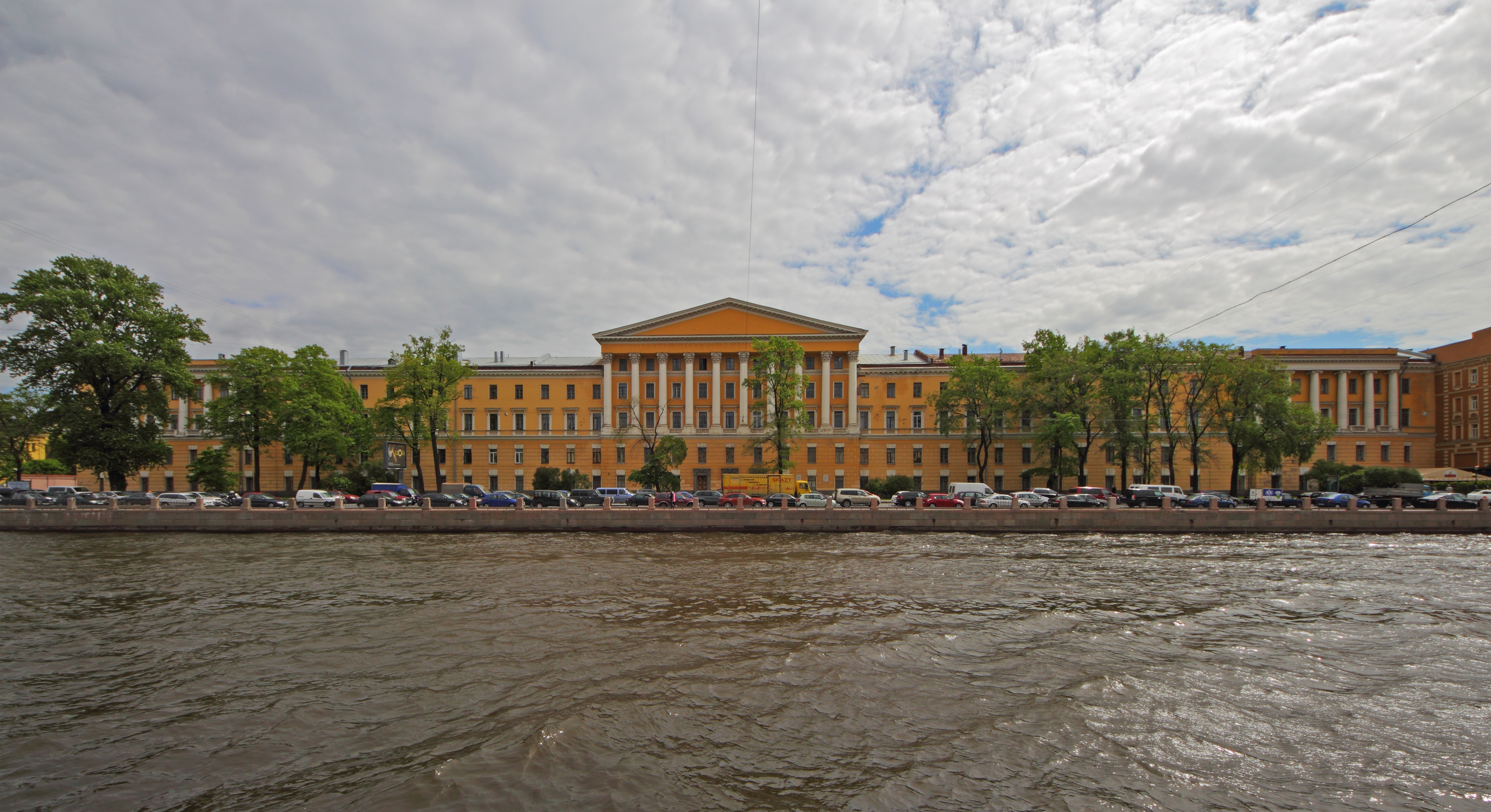
Obukhov Hospital in St. Petersburg, Russia, where Hermann is committed at the story's conclusion

Hermann, an ethnic German, is an officer of the engineers in the Imperial Russian Army. He constantly watches the other officers gamble, but never plays himself. One night, Tomsky tells a story about his grandmother, a countess. Many years ago, in France, she lost a fortune at faro, and then won it back with the secret of the three winning cards, which she learned from the notorious Count of St. Germain. Hermann becomes obsessed with obtaining the secret.

The countess (now 87 years old) has a young ward, Lizavyeta Ivanovna. Hermann sends love letters to Lizavyeta, and persuades her to let him into the house. There Hermann accosts the countess, demanding the secret. She first tells him that story was a joke. Hermann persists, but she refuses to speak. Finally he threatens her with a pistol, and she dies of fright. He flees to Lizavyeta's apartment (in the same building) and tells her what has happened. He defends himself by saying the pistol was not loaded. Though Lizavyeta helps him escape, she is disgusted to learn that his attentions to her were motivated by greed.

Hermann attends the funeral of the countess, and is terrified to see the countess open her eyes in the coffin and look at him. Later that night, her ghost appears to him and names the secret three cards (three, seven, and ace). It tells him he must play just once each night and then orders him to marry Lizavyeta. Hermann takes his entire savings to Chekalinsky's salon, where wealthy men gamble at faro for high stakes. On the first night, he bets it all on the three and wins. On the second night, he wins on the seven. On the third night, he bets on the ace—but when the cards are shown, he finds he has bet on the Queen of Spades, not the ace, and he loses everything. When the Queen appears to wink at him, he is astonished by her remarkable resemblance to the old countess, and flees in terror.

In a short conclusion, Pushkin writes that Lizavyeta marries the son of the Countess' former steward, a state official who makes a good salary. Hermann, however, goes mad and is committed to an asylum. He is installed in Room 17 at the Obukhov hospital; he answers no questions, but merely mutters with unusual rapidity: "Three, seven, ace! Three, seven, queen!"

== Inspiration ==
The countess was inspired by Princess Natalya Petrovna Golitsyna, who served as lady-in-waiting for five Russian emperors and was 92 at the time Pushkin wrote "The Queen of Spades". According to a legend, Golitsyna had been a successful gambler. When her grandson lost a considerable amount of money playing cards and came to her to beg her for money, Golitsyna instead revealed to him the secret three cards that Count Saint-Germain showed to her in Paris. However, while the Countess died in the story, Golitsyna outlived Pushkin and reached the age of 97.

Some critics believe the Count Saint-Germain holds historical importance in the story. Saint-Germain serves as the namesake for the story's protagonist, Hermann. Beyond this, the historical Saint-Germain may represent a father figure for Hermann, the antithesis to Hermann's character, or a former love interest of the countess who seeks revenge for her death by causing Hermann to pick the wrong cards.

The card game of faro is played by having a player bet on a winning card. The dealer then begins turning over cards, turning the first (known as "soda") to his left. The second card is placed face up to his right; this is the first winning card. The third card is placed face up in the left pile, as a losing card. The dealer continues turning over cards, alternating piles until the bet has been won or lost.

== Themes ==
=== Reality vs. the supernatural ===
According to Fyodor Dostoevsky, Pushkin's tale represents "the pinnacle of the art of the fantastic". Pushkin does not make it clear whether the story is completely rational or has supernatural elements. For instance, does the countess appear to Hermann in his imagination or a dream, or did he see an actual apparition? Critics have attempted to answer this question using a variety of cryptographic clues within the text. These critics focus on three elements: the origin of the three, seven and ace; whether Hermann could have identified the cards without the ghost's intervention, and possible explanations for Hermann's mistake with the last card.

The critic Gary Rosenshield claims that, by making the wrong choice of cards, Hermann actually did the right thing: as a man obsessed with gambling, having won the money would have meant that he could never gamble again, and therefore would have never again lived.

Critics who favour a rational explanation, such as Nathan Rosen and Viktor Vonogradov, claim that Hermann may have simply seen a likeness between the Countess who gave him the secret and the Queen card, leading him to make a mistake. This explanation focuses on Pushkin's quote in the story that "two fixed ideas can no more exist together in the moral world than two bodies can occupy one and the same place in the physical world". Here, Hermann cannot separate the actual cards from the Countess who reveals them to him, leading him to accidentally choose the queen instead of an ace.

Critics who favour a supernatural interpretation argue that the card changed after Hermann had picked it. These explanations argue that the Countess sought revenge on Hermann for her death. Critic Sergei Davydov argues that, since the Countess doubted that Hermann would indeed marry Lizavyeta—a concession he had made to acquire the secret—her ghost caused a magical transformation of the cards that led to Hermann's downfall.

=== Storytelling ===
Pushkin's tale is considered to be a work about "telling stories". Hermann in a way attempts to author his own fate by setting up a gambling situation in which he is guaranteed to win. Hermann's motivations to set up the scenario also come primarily from gossip, or word of mouth from his acquaintances. It is as if he is set within a story told by others, and feels inspired to write his own.

One reading of The Queen of Spades holds that the story reveals the Russian stereotype of the German, one who is a cold and calculating person bent on accumulating wealth.

=== Avarice ===
Rosenshield describes Pushkin's Queen of Spades as an "eternal tale of gambling and avarice". In the story, Hermann becomes obsessed by gambling, even before the Countess grants him her secret to the cards. According to critic Nathan Rosen, Hermann's fatal mistake at the end of the story constitutes an act of self-punishment: Hermann punishes himself for the avarice of his corrupted soul. Beyond this greed in the form of his gambling obsession, Hermann's avarice manifests itself in his dealings with Lizavyeta and the Countess. From the moment when he first sets eye on her, Hermann manipulates Lizaveta and her "injured innocence" to gain access to the Countess and the gambling secrets she holds; however, Hermann's "depravity becomes fully manifest in the climactic bedroom scene" when he trespasses into the Countess' room and causes her death.

== Style ==
Pushkin uses metapoetic moments throughout the story to question the reliability of the narrator and to discern the genre of the work. These metapoetic moments refer to the story dealing with stories internally. One of the clearest example of this takes place after Hermann’s encounter with the countess’ ghostly form. After her departure, Hermann immediately writes down his vision, recording it on paper and writing a small story within the larger story of The Queen of Spades. A second example is when Tomsky and his grandmother talk about traditional plot lines within a Russian novel, of which his grandmother denies the existence.

== Adaptations ==
One of the most notable adaptations of The Queen of Spades was a film produced by Anatole de Grunwald, completed in 1949. This film is recognized for its fidelity to the original story, with few differences such as the depiction of the backstory about how the Countess acquired the secret of the three winning cards. This film was directed by Thorold Dickinson. It received widespread critical acclaim and was nominated for the BAFTA award for Best British Film.

Pushkin's story has been adapted numerous times into multiple mediums. These include:

- An 1864 German operetta by Franz von Suppé
- An 1890 opera by Russian composer Pyotr Ilyich Tchaikovsky
- A 1910 Russian silent short film directed by Pyotr Chardynin
- A 1916 Russian silent film directed by Yakov Protazanov
- A 1927 German silent film
- The 1949 British film The Queen of Spades produced by Anatole de Grunwald
- A 1960 Soviet film directed by Roman Tikhomirov
- A 1982 Soviet film by Igor Maslennikov
- A 1988 Soviet film These... three trusty cards... by Aleksandr Orlov

The story has also been adapted for radio, including:

- The 9 November 1947 episode of Mystery in the Air, starring Peter Lorre as Hermann.
- A 1976 BBC World Service adaptation by Maurice Travers, with Ian Ogilvy as Hermann.
- A 1997 BBC Radio 4 adaptation for the Afternoon Drama series, with Greg Wise and Amanda Root.
