= Zerega's Spanish Troubadours =

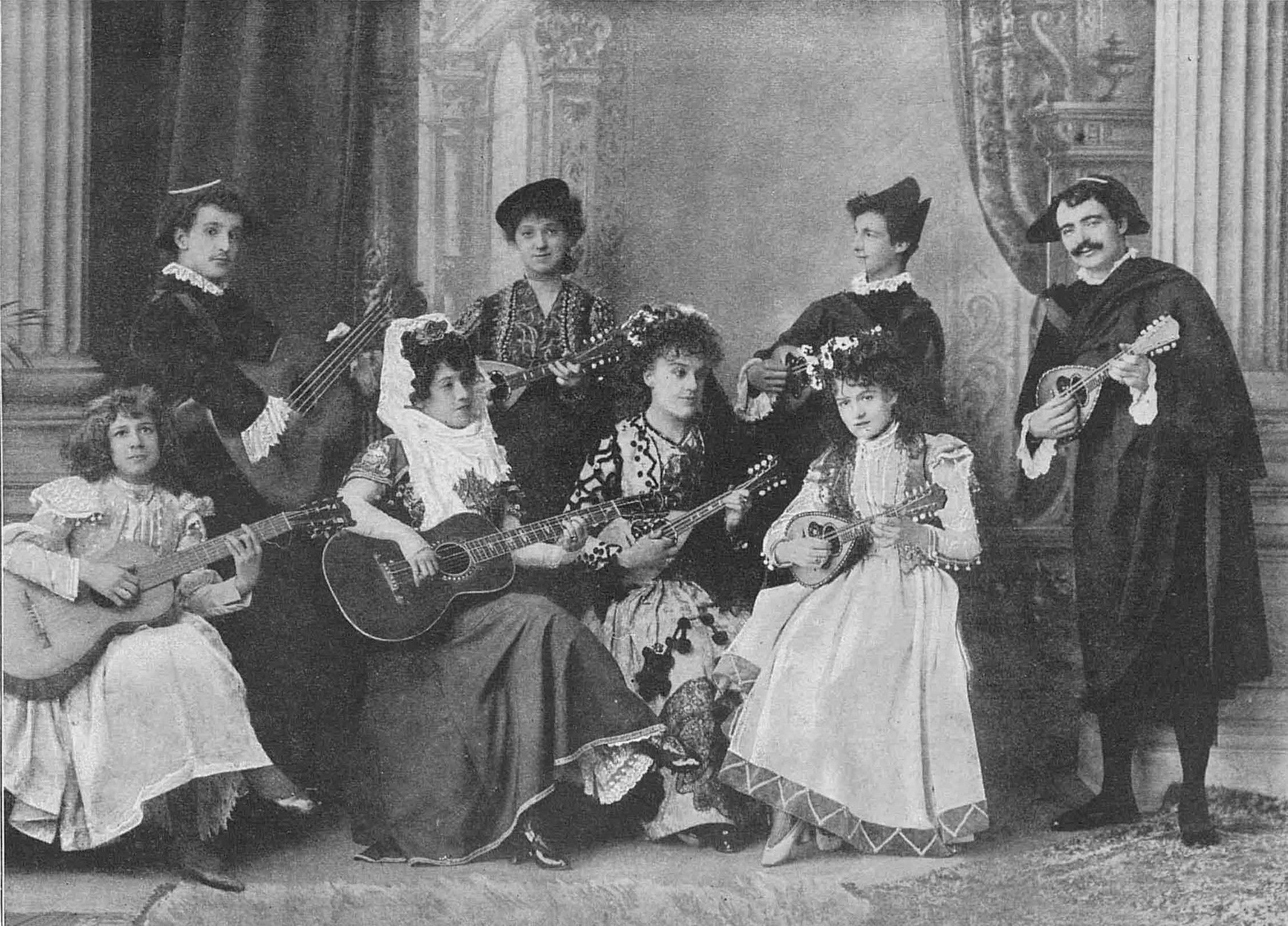

Background information
- Origin: USA and London
- Genres: Classical music, Latin
- Years active: 1887-1900
- Labels: No known recordings
- Members: n/a
- Past members: Eduardo Zerega (Edward E. Hill, Senorita Dema Terval (May D. Hill), Calamaro Durango (guitar), Chinita Zeregal
- Website: None

Zerega's Spanish Troubadours were a mandolin and guitar ensemble active at the end of the 19th century in England. They were directed by Eduardo Zerega, known in the mandolin world for a single work, Souvenir de Bovio. Less well known is the untimely death of his wife in 1896 in New York, that was described in the newspapers of the day, as the "Zerega Mystery". Zerega was the stage name of Edgar Hill and his wife May. While the Zerega's promoted themselves as from Madrid, Spain, the Hills were born in Indiana, but moved to London shortly after they were married.

== Zerega's Spanish Troubadours ==
Zerega's Spanish Troubadours 1897 concert announcement

In America in 1887, the 5-piece troupe toured as "Zerega's Royal Spanish Troubadours" to favourable reviews, in San Rafael, Los Angeles, San Bernardino Opera House, and Sacramento. A review noted:

They comprise three gentlemen and two ladies, who, arrayed in the national Spanish costume, execute concerted numbers and solos on the mandolin and guitar. Their performance was a pleasing one, and greatly delighted those present. The principal artist, Senor Edouard Zarega. has a genuine ability, masterly execution and strong sympathetic feeling. Senor Calamaro Durango gave a guitar solo, and Senorita Terval played several numbers on a species of Æolian harp, which won favor and several recalls.

In England in 1888, they billed themselves as "The Zerega Spanish Troubadours", consisting of "two on mandolin and guitar, with tambourine, castanet and fairy-bell accompaniments", appearing at the Royal Albert Hall, West Theatre. They also toured as "Zerega's Spanish Minstrels". On 17 and 21 August 1895, "These famous Mandoline and Guitar Players, Singers, and Dancers had the honour of appearing before her Majesty the Queen [Victoria] [at] Osborne House", and performed the following programme:

- Overture, "El Secreto" .. Thomas
- Jota, "Zaragosa" .. Zerega
- Mandoline Solo .. Senor Zerega
- Concert Vals "La Troubadours" .. Granados
- Overture, "Pique Dame" .. Suppe
- Flores de Espana .. Zerega
- Song, "Los Sacamuelas" .. Gomez
- Dance, "La Cachucka" and "La Chinita" .. Viega
- Serenata, "Granados" .. Zerega
- Song, "Me Gustan" .. Perez
- Dance, "Ole" .. Moro
- Capricho, "The Circus" .. Zerega

== E. Zerega ==
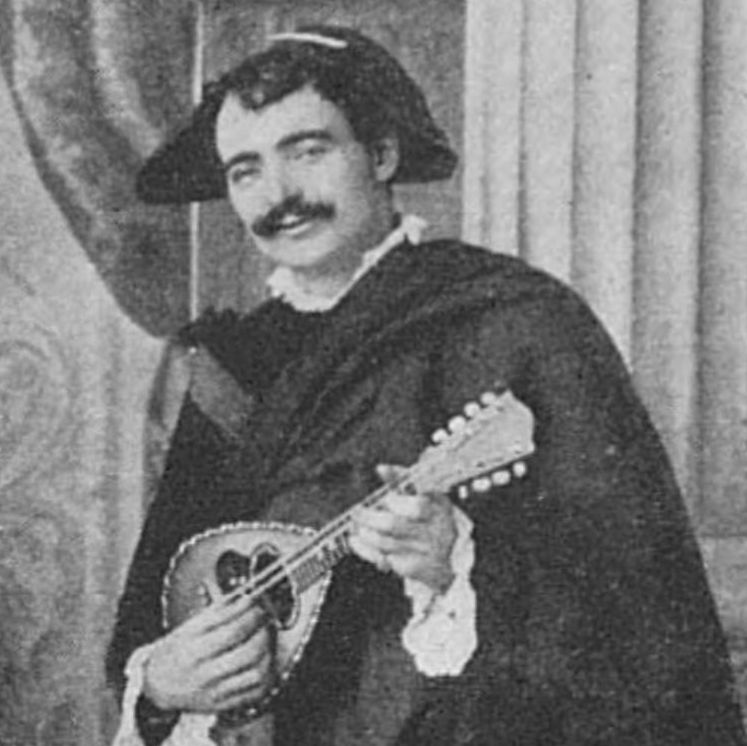
Eduardo Zerega, AKA Edgar E. Hill

=== Personal ===
Edgar E. Hill, AKA Eduardo Zerega

Eduardo Zerega was born Edgar E. Hill around 1860 in Columbus, Indiana, USA. On 21 April 1880 he married May D Keith in Bartholomew, Indiana. Because the marriage was opposed by her father, the couple left Columbus, and went to live in London. When visiting New York in 1896, the papers described him as "about five feet five inches in height, and strongly built". For a time in England, Eduardo Zerego claimed to be a Spanish national, before confirming his American citizenship. He died in London on 22 July 1922, leaving effects of £5,105, (worth about £250,000 now).

The Zeragas had one daughter, Chinita Zerega, born around 1882. As a youngster, she often appeared with the Spanish Troubadours, sometimes credited as "Chinita Gomez Zerega", and also billed as "La Chinita: The Little Dancer", who also performed for Queen Victoria in 1895. In 1903, she was performing with a Mme Nińa Lewelin in their own ensemble, Los Trobadores, described as "Mandolinists, Guitarists, Banjoists, Vocalists and Dancers". In 1911, she was performing in Singapore in her own production called "La Pandera", described as "Novel Attraction" and "Typical Dance of Aragona".

=== Souvenir de Bovio ===
Souvenir de Bovio (translation: Souvenir of the Groom) is a romance, and described as the only composition by E. Zerega from around 1900. A recording by mandolinist Hugo D'Alton accompanied by pianist Clifton Helliwell was released in 1961 on the Collectors Record label. In 2009, mandolinist Alison Stephens arranged the piece for mandolin with Craig Ogden on guitar, and released it on their CD Souvenirs.

== The Zerega Mystery ==
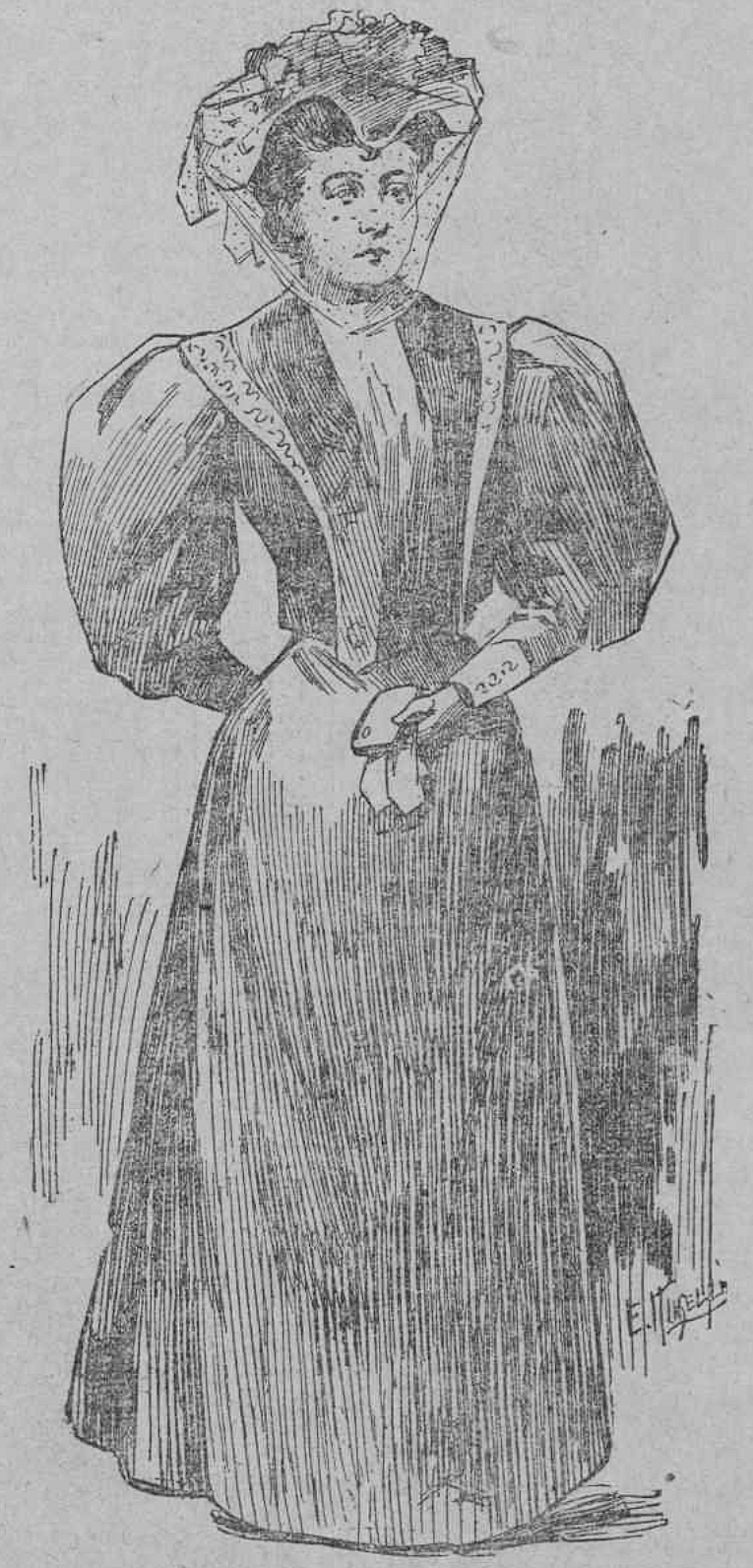
"Mrs Everett of Boston", who was later identified as Mrs E. E. Hill, Senorita Zerega

On 6 May 1896, a woman registered at the Colonnade Hotel, Lafayette Place, New York, as "Mrs Everett of Boston". Two days later, she committed suicide by shooting herself with a revolver through the left ear. The suicide note read:

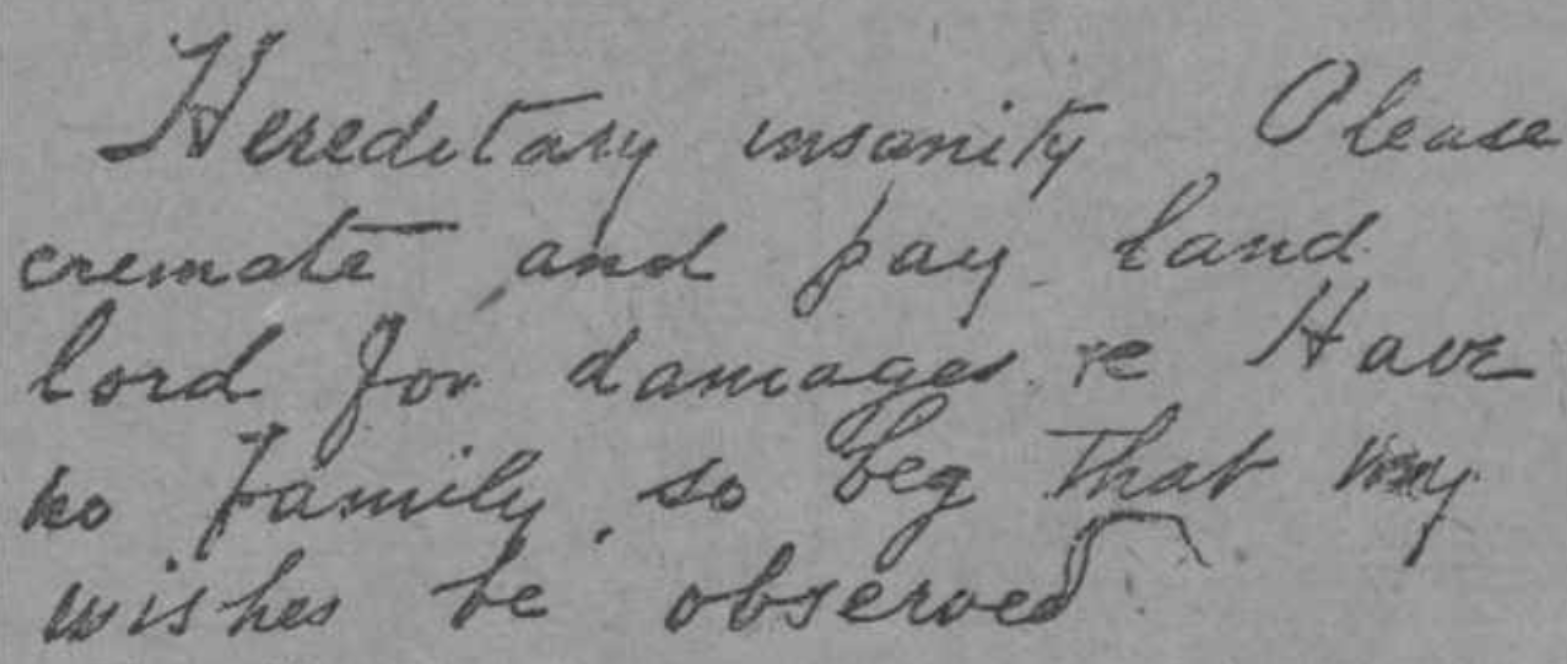
"Hereditary insanity. Please cremate and pay landlord for damages, etc. Have no family, so beg that my wishes be observed"

There was soon speculation as to the identity of the woman, and there were suspicions (incorrectly) that she was a French woman called Louise Lansburg. But eventually she was identified from the manufacturer's name on her gloves and a scrap of printed label, which led to "Mrs Everett" being identified as Mrs E. Zerega, whose name appeared on the passenger manifest of the USS Saint Paul, and that she was Mrs Edgar E. Hill. A positive identification was made by her father-in-law ex-Judge Ralph Hill of Indianapolis.

Before she died, May had gone to a New York lawyer to ensure that $5,000 worth of property she owned in Indiana would be bequeathed to her husband. Four years after her death, her will was successfully contested by her aunt on the grounds of "unsoundness of mind".
