= Pádraig Ó Cuinn =

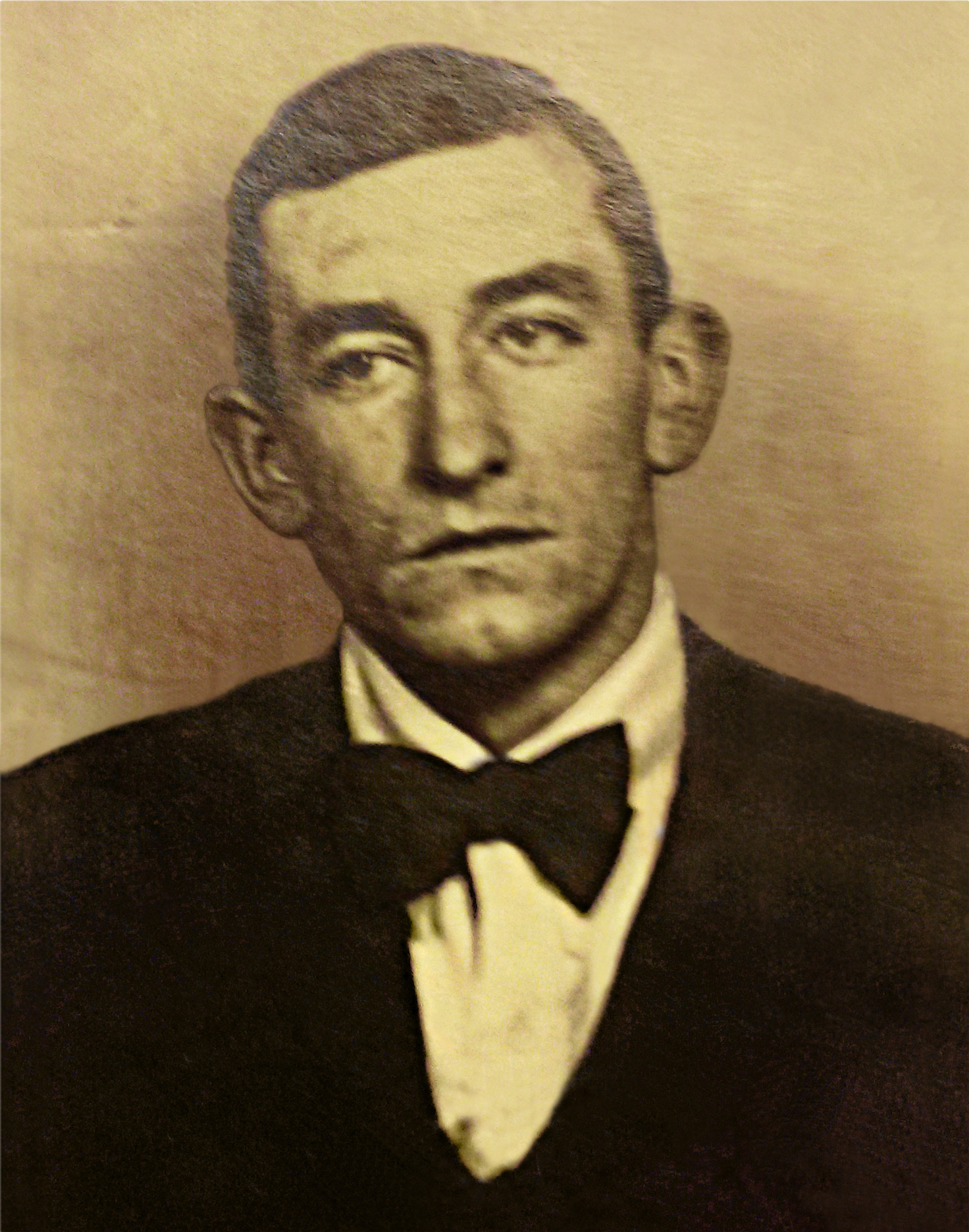
Padraig Quinn in 1924

Pádraig Ó Cuinn (born Patrick Quinn; 1899 – 1974) was an Irish Republican Army Quartermaster General in the Fourth Northern Division in the Irish War of Independence. He succeeded Aiken as commander of that division in the Civil War, where he took the anti-treaty side.

Born in Liverpool, he was raised in Newry where he attended the Abbey Christian Brothers Grammar School. His father, John Quinn, opened the first supermarket in Ireland, The Milestone. He lived in the US and England for many years before returning to Newry to work as a general practitioner. He later adopted the name Pádraig Ó Cuinn.

During the War of Independence he commanded a unit that operated against the British in Dublin city centre. He was involved in numerous operations in the field.

He fought on the anti-Treaty side in the Irish Civil War. On 27 July, he led a small unit that breached the Dundalk prison wall with dynamite, and in fifteen minutes captured the garrison of 300 men and arms for 400 and freed Republican prisoners without any casualties. In spring 1923, he succeeded Frank Aiken as commander of the IRA's 4th Northern Division. He was severely wounded in the conflict and interned in the Curragh, where he watched his brother, Sean, die from neglect in an adjoining hospital bed.

Quinn had tried to escape an ambush at a safe house in Co. Louth at the end of the Civil War before being taken prisoner.

After the war, he presided over the Newry Easter commemoration ceremonies in St Mary's cemetery in Newry, on the border between counties Armagh and Down, for 30 years. He lobbied the Irish Government to recognize men who served under his command in both conflicts as veterans entitled to veterans' benefits.

== Personal life ==
Pádraig Quinn married Marguerite Magennis of the Priory House (Chapel Street, Newry); the couple had 5 children: Sean, Ann, Deirdre, Felim and Niall. Quinn was also a co-founder of the Old Newry Society.

== Sources ==
- Ernie O'Malley, On Another Man's Wound.
- Ernie O'Malley, The Singing Flame (Anvil Books Limited, Ireland, 1978)
- The Newry Reporter, Thursday, 25 August 2005, page 6.
- Newry Democrat, Wednesday, 7 September 2005
- Old Newry Society, The Book of Newry (Old Newry Publications, N. Ireland, 2008)
- Brendan Hall, Dundalk Democrat, 29 July 1922; "Dundalk Sensations: Jail Bombed and Prisoners Released"
