= Des Matrosen Heimkehr =

Opera composed by Franz von Suppé

- Opera by Franz von Suppé
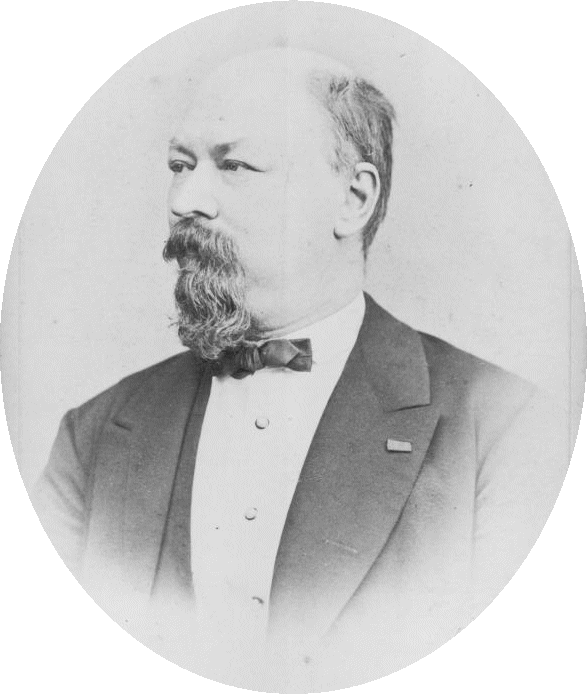
- The composer
- Librettist: Anton Langer
- Language: German
- Premiere: 4 May 1885; 140 years ago Stadttheater, Hamburg

Des Matrosen Heimkehr or Il Ritorno del Marinaio is a romantic opera in two acts by Dalmatian composer Franz von Suppé to a libretto by the late Anton Langer (died 1879). It was premiered at the Stadttheater, Hamburg, on 4 May 1885. The opera was a success but quickly forgotten in Germany, and then the original score of the opera was lost in bombing in 1943. Croatian conductor Adriano Martinolli d'Arcy managed to retrieve a copy in an American archive in 2007, and the opera was revived in an Italian translation by the Croatian National Theatre in Split in 2013 and recorded by the Croatian National Theatre Ivan pl. Zajc in Rijeka in 2016.

== Plot ==
The story is set in a Dalmatian port, unnamed in the libretto, but in contemporary newspaper reviews said to be Hvar, a detail which appears to have been supplied by the composer. The titular sailor, Pietro (baritone), seeks to demob from the navy and return home after twenty-years at sea, having signed onto the navy following disappointment in love. The mayor of the Dalmatian port, Quirino (bass), wants to oblige a young man Nicolò (tenor) to fulfill the town's obligation to provide three recruits to the navy, thereby leaving the mayor's young ward Jela (soprano), whom he covets for himself. Pietro recognizes through the girl Jela's song that she is the daughter of his now deceased lover. Pietro sacrifices himself by reenlisting in the navy in Nicolò's place.

== Recordings ==
- Il Ritorno del Marinaio - Ljubomir Puškarić (baritone), Marjukka Tepponen (soprano), Giorgio Surian, Alias Farazin, Rijeka Opera Choir, Rijeka Symphony Orchestra, Rijeka Opera, Adriano Martinolli d'Arcy. CPO, recorded 2016, released 2017.
