= Dichter und Bauer =

1846 opera

Dichter und Bauer (Poet and Peasant) was in 1900, after composer Franz von Suppé's death, made into an operetta in 3 acts using music by him. It premiered, however, as incidental music by Suppé to a Karl Elmar comedy of that name on 24 August 1846 at the Theater an der Wien, in Vienna. Its overture is famous. In 1936, Gustav Quedenfeldt wrote a new libretto based on Suppé's composition version "C".

== Roles ==
- Theophil von Salbenstein – a rich landowner
- Hermine von Meyen – his ward
- Ferdinand Römer – poet
- Christian Berner – peasant
- Lieschen – Berner's daughter
- Konrad Mauer – young peasant
- Barbara – a distant relative of Salbenstein

== Plot summary ==
The story is set in the picturesque Upper Bavaria.

Theophil von Salbenstein is a rich landowner and guardian of Hermine von Meyen who has just inherited a considerable fortune managed by him. A clause of the will, however, stipulates that in order to inherit the fortune, Hermine has either to wait for three years or to marry Salbenstein immediately. But Hermine is in love with the poet Ferdinand Römer. Ferdinand, on the other hand, has just fled to the countryside, assuming his relationship with Hermine had ended. The poet dedicates his enthusiastic and romantic poetry to Lieschen, the daughter of the peasant Christian Berner. Barbara, a distant relative of Theophil, comes on the scene to resolve the imbroglio. She manages to show Theophil a written marriage agreement. At the end, everyone gets what he or she deserves.

== Plot summary based on Quedenfeldt's 1936 libretto ==
In the days of Emperor Franz Joseph's Habsburg monarchy, the Hendelberg Marriage Market takes place every spring. Marriageable girls and fellow locals who love each other are married the same day in the chapel. Even the rich farmer Lugosch appears with his son Florian, because the old man plans to marry his simple-minded offspring with the proud Jelka, farmer Martin's daughter. However, Jelka is not in the least interested in Florian, and actually Florian is not into the idea, either, because his thoughts always revolve around the cute maid Julischka. However, the main point of contention between Lugosch and Martin is in reality the appropriation of the Steinerhof estate whose owner has recently passed away.

While Lugosch wants to acquire the property for his son, Martin wishes that his ward Peter Werschitz, the legitimate heir to the estate, become the new owner. But no one knows where Peter is or whether he is still alive, and in three days the legal deadline expires, after which the Steinerhof will be auctioned. Then, to the astonishment of the locals, it is revealed that Julischka recently served as a maid to a Peter Werschitz in Budapest. Questioning the girl produces even more incredible news: Peter Werschitz is supposedly a poet! Martin, Jelka and Julischka set off for Budapest to bring Peter back home. But before the lost son becomes the rightful owner of the Steinerhof estate and a successful writer, all kinds of strange and grotesque obstacles must be overcome between the peasants and the townspeople. Finally, without the marriage market, true love prevails, and a young couple finds happiness at the Steinerhof.
