= Dundalk Gaol =

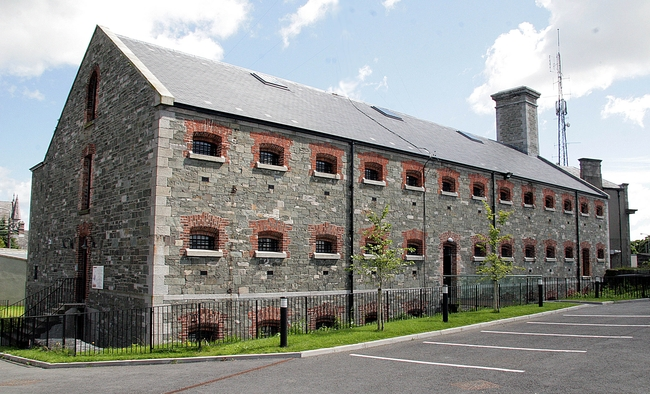
- The Men's Wing of the Gaol, now the Oriel Centre.
- Location: Dundalk, County Louth, Ireland
- Opened: 1854
- Closed: 1931

Dundalk Gaol is a former prison in Dundalk, County Louth, Ireland. The men's wing is now "The Oriel Centre", the women's wing is the Louth County Archive and the Governor's House now a Garda station.

== History ==
Built in 1853 to help with the overcrowding of the gaol already in place at Crowe Street - which site is now occupied by Dundalk Town Hall, it was designed by John Neville and cost £23,000 to be constructed. The gaol was opened on 19 January 1854. For approximately 60 years, the gaol functioned largely as an unremarkable county gaol, averaging 25 prisoners at any one time, with few sentences of more than 2 years. During the 1870s, it became the practice to send major offenders to a convict prison in Dublin, and a number of county gaols were closed. This caused an overcrowding problem and a Royal Commission Report of 1877 recommended more prisons and even portable iron jails. Also, Australia was refusing to accept any more Irish convicts. This led to the extension of prisons in Dublin and Spike Island, Cork.

By 191 the gaol was not in use but was revived in 1918 to house IRA prisoners, including Stack, Treacy, Lynch, etc., who embarked on short lived hunger strikes, were released and returned to their campaigns, without a great deal of attention. In 1922-1923 the gaol was swapped by the two Civil War parties back and forth and which led to some disturbances in Dundalk, reflected by some newspaper coverage, however, the major action took place in Dublin and Munster and the north east was relatively free from serious attrition, particularly as Aiken took only a minor role in the conflict.

The gaol was formally closed by Ministerial Order in 1931. The Gardaí Síochána moved into the Governor's House and admin section in 1945, setting it up as a new police station, while Louth County Council used the existing yard as machinery and vehicle area and the cell buildings for storing office equipment, in 1991 the basement of the northern cellblock (male wing) was refurbished to serve as a National Emergency Centre for use by Louth Civil Defence. 2007 saw the male block offered to Comhaltas Ceoltoirí Éireann for use as a Regional Centre of Comhaltas for the five counties of Louth, Meath, Armagh, Monaghan and Cavan.

== 1922 Jailbreak ==
On 27 July 1922, the Fourth Northern Division of the Irish Republican Army placed an explosive device on the wall of gaol along the Ardee

== Notable prisoners ==
- Donal Quinn
- Austin Stack, was transferred from Mountjoy to Dundalk Gaol in November 1917, and led a hunger strike.
- Frank Aiken was a prisoner during the Irish Civil War. Escaped during the bombing of the jail on 27 July 1922
- Seán Treacy
- Diarmuid Lynch, who was secretly married in the Gaol on 24 April 1918 after his fiancée Mary Quinn and a priest were smuggled into the gaol.
- Séamus Ó Néill, Professor at Rockwell College, joined Séan Treacy on hunger strike.
