= Pique Dame (Suppé) =

- Operetta by Franz von Suppé
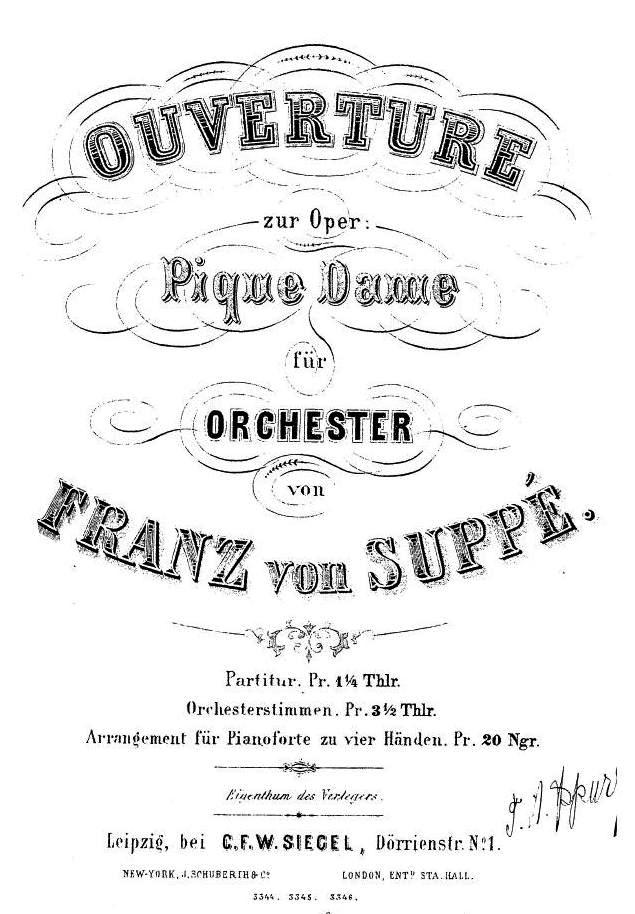
- Title page of the score for the Pique Dame overture, published in 1867
- Translation: The Queen of Spades
- Librettist: S. Strasser
- Language: German
- Premiere: June 1864; Thalia Theater, Graz

Pique Dame (The Queen of Spades) is an operetta in two acts by Franz von Suppé to a German-language libretto very loosely based on Alexander Pushkin's 1834 short story "The Queen of Spades". The author of the libretto is S. Strasser (probably Suppé's second wife Sofie Strasser). Pique Dame was a revised version of Suppé's 1862 operetta Die Kartenschlägerin ("The Fortune Teller") and premiered in June 1864 at the Thalia Theater in Graz. The work is primarily known today for its overture which remains a popular concert piece.

== Background and performance history ==
Pique Dame is a revised version of Suppé's earlier (and unsuccessful) one-act operetta on the same subject, Die Kartenschlägerin ("The Fortune Teller") which had premiered in Vienna in 1862. Suppé expanded the earlier version to two acts and retitled it Pique Dame, the French title of Pushkin's "The Queen of Spades", on which its libretto is very loosely based. The manuscript libretto is marked "S.S.". In Franz von Suppé: Werk und Leben, Hans-Dieter Roser speculates that this may have referred to Sigmund Schlesinger (1832–1918), a Viennese writer known for his short comic plays. In 2019 Andreas Weigel found out that the author of the libretto is S. Strasser (probably Suppé's second wife Sofie Strasser whom Suppé met in 1860).

The new operetta premiered at the Thalia Theater in Graz in June 1864 with Amalie Materna singing the central role of Judith. The exact date of the premiere varies in the sources. According to Otto Schneidereit in Franz von Suppé: der Wiener aus Dalmatien, it was 24 June, while Roser gives the date as 20 June. Following the Graz premiere which had been personally supervised by Suppé, Pique Dame opened at the Carltheater in Vienna in 1865.

Pique Dame was fairly successful in its day but is now rarely performed whole. Its overture, published separately in 1867, is however a popular concert and recording piece. Other music from Pique Dame was chosen by the Metropolitan Opera in 1931 for incorporation into its staging that year of Boccaccio.

=== Recording ===
More recently, on 1 December 2006, Pique Dame was given a concert performance at the Cologne Philharmonie conducted by Michail Jurowski. This was broadcast on WDR radio later that month. Moreover, before the concert, the same singers and conductor made a studio recording which was released in 2009 on CD. This is, however, presented as being in "one act", and it lacks dialogue.

== Roles ==
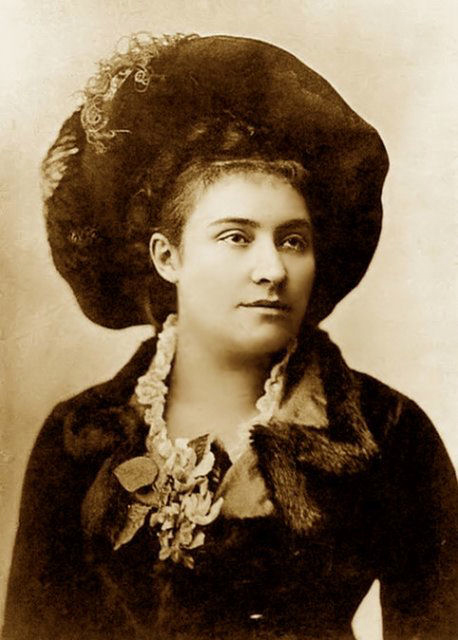
Amalie Materna, who created the role of Judith in the 1864 premiere

Role	Voice type	Premiere cast, June 1864
Judith, a fortune teller	mezzo-soprano	Amalie Materna
Emil, an army officer and composer, Judith's foster son	baritone	
Hedwig, in love with and loved by Emil	soprano	
Fabian Muker, Hedwig's guardian	tenor	
Madame Duplesis, Hedwig's mother, a wealthy widow	speaking role	
Henriette, Hedwig's girlfriend	soprano	
Emma, Hedwig's girlfriend	soprano	
Fanni, Hedwig's girlfriend	soprano	
Bertha, Hedwig's girlfriend	soprano	
Clara, Hedwig's girlfriend	mezzo-soprano	
Gebhardt, Emil's friend	bass	
Felix, Emil's friend	tenor	

== Synopsis ==
The story concerns the tribulations of the young lovers, Emil, an impoverished composer, and Hedwig, the daughter of a wealthy widow. Hedwig is in turn pursued by her guardian, Fabian Muker, who is also in love with her (and her fortune). Through the efforts of Judith, a fortune-teller and Emil's foster mother, all ends happily with Emil and Hedwig able to marry, and Hedwig's guardian revealed to be Emil's uncle.

== Overture ==
According to Robert Letellier in his 2013 introduction to Franz von Suppé: Overtures and Preludes, the enduring popularity the work's overture as a concert piece for orchestras stems from its "varied and vivid melodies", beautiful flute solo, and themes which "leap" between the higher and lower instruments of the orchestra. The original orchestral score for the overture has been adapted for piano four hands by Theodor Herbert (1822–1891) and for solo piano by Clemens Schultze-Biesantz (1876–1935). It was also adapted for the mechanical organ by the Aeolian Company who described the piece in their 1919 catalog:

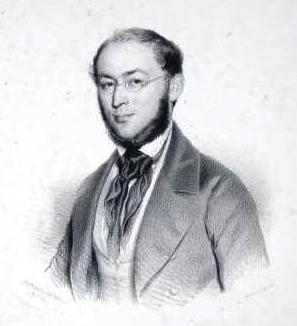
Franz von Suppé as a young man

At the beginning there is heard a mysterious theme, several times repeated, and this theme then turns out to be simply the accompaniment for a lyric melody which is now voiced above it and which proves to be an important musical factor in the overture, culminating in a big climax. After this a merry theme makes its appearance, its brisk, happy character supplying ideal contrast to the foregoing music. Another fine lyric theme and a gay melody are added, and a rushing brilliant coda brings the overture to a happy conclusion.

The Pique Dame overture was often heard in cinemas during the era of the silent film when deluxe screenings were preceded by an overture or other concert piece played by a live orchestra. The film music director and composer Hugo Riesenfeld listed it as one of the ten most frequently performed pieces of music in movie theaters of the era. D. W. Griffith's 1914 film Judith of Bethulia had a complete live sound track specified by Griffiths himself in which the Pique Dame overture, played in its entirety, opened the second reel. (The Judith sound track encompassed 11 pieces in all, beginning with music from Wallace's opera Maritana and ending with Grieg's Peer Gynt Suite.)

== Recordings ==
The only known recording of the full opera is:

- Suppé: Pique Dame – Anjara Ingrid Bartz (Judith); Mojca Erdmann (Hedwig ); Tom Erik Lie (Emil); Thomas Dewald (Fabian Muker); Anneli Pfeffer (Henriette); WDR Radio Orchestra and Chorus; Michail Jurowski (conductor). Label: CPO 777 480-2

It was recorded in the Klaus-von-Bismark-Saal, Cologne, 21–29 November 2006, with the same cast, orchestra, and conductor who gave the live concert performance of the work at the Cologne Philharmonie on 1 December 2006. The spoken dialogue is omitted in the recording.

The overture on its own appears in numerous orchestral recordings, including Sir Neville Marriner conducting the Academy of St. Martin in the Fields on EMI, Georg Solti conducting the Vienna Philharmonic and John Barbirolli conducting the Hallé Orchestra. It also appears in Suppé: Overtures and Marches with Neeme Järvi conducting the Royal Scottish National Orchestra (released in 2013). One of the earliest recordings of the overture was in 1917 by the Victor Talking Machine Company. An excerpt from this overture plays at the very end of a M*A*S*H season 10 episode entitled "Picture This."
