= Fourth Northern Division of the Irish Republican Army =

The Fourth Northern Division of the Irish Republican Army operated in an area covering parts of counties Louth, Armagh, Monaghan, and Down during the Irish War of Independence and Civil War. Frank Aiken was commander and Pádraig Quinn was the quartermaster general. John McCoy was Adjutant General for the division. After McCoy was shot and captured by British Crown forces in 1921, Seán F. Quinn, Pádraig's brother, took over the position. Frank Thornton, Third Director of Operations in Michael Collins' Intelligence Staff, played a key role in organising Irish Republican Army activities across South Armagh, Louth, Monaghan, Cavan, Longford and Down. Many men in the area, unlike most of the rest of the Northern Ireland IRA, joined the anti-Treaty side in the Irish Civil War (1922–23). Men from the area also took part in IRA campaigns in the 1940 and 1950s.

At the outbreak of the Civil War, the Fourth Northern Division was neutral and in control of the Dundalk military barracks after the British Army vacated it on 13 April 1922. Aiken was in Dublin with Richard Mulcahy (Chief of Staff of the IRA until the split), arguing against the Free State taking military action against a large anti-treaty IRA force which had taken over the Four Courts. Mulcahy ordered Aiken back to Dundalk.

On 4 July, Aiken wrote to Mulcahy stating the Fourth Northern Division would stay neutral, called for an end to the fighting and for the removal of the Oath of Allegiance from the Treaty because "you have the simple national abhorrence of swearing allegiance to a foreign king and allowing part of the Nation to be ruled by people who have a sworn loyalty to that king."

On 15 July, Aiken again met in Dublin with Mulcahy, arguing for peace. The following day Mulcahy's men came as friends to Dundalk and captured Aiken's barracks through a breach of faith, and Aiken and his officers and men were imprisoned in Dundalk jail. On 27 July, John McCoy led a small unit that attacked Dundalk, breached the prison wall with dynamite, and in fifteen minutes captured the garrison of 300 men and arms for 400. There no casualties during the jail break. A number of escaping divisional members were recaptured by Free State forces, including John McCoy of Mullaghbawn, who had been shot and captured by British Crown forces in 1921, and who had been a brigadier in the barracks before the Free State troops took command.

On 23 April 1923, Aiken was elected chief-of-Staff of the IRA. An Army Council, composed of Aiken, Pilkington and Tom Barry, was named. Seán F. Quinn succeeded him as officer commanding the Fourth Northern Division. On 27 April, Aiken issued a Suspension of Offensives command that all offensive operations should be suspended from noon on 30 April. This marked the end of the civil war.
