= SS El Kahira =

History
- Name: (United Kingdom) El Kahira
- Owner: Trading & Coaling Co.
- Port of registry: London, United Kingdom
- Builder: Napier R. & Sons
- Yard number: 427
- Launched: 18 February 1892
- Completed: 1892
- In service: 1892
- Identification: Official number: 110140
- Fate: Sank in a storm 9 July 1922

General characteristics
- Type: Passenger/Cargo ship
- Tonnage: 2,034 GRT
- Length: 91.4 metres (299 ft 10 in)
- Beam: 11.4 metres (37 ft 5 in)
- Depth: 8 metres (26 ft 3 in)
- Installed power: 1 x 3 cyl. Triple expansion engine
- Propulsion: Screw propeller
- Speed: 16 knots
- Crew: 28

SS El Kahira was a British Passenger/Cargo ship that sank during a storm in the English Channel on 9 July 1922 while she was travelling from London, United Kingdom to Algiers, Algeria while carrying a cargo of 1,310 tons of bagged sugar.

== Construction ==
El Kahira was launched on 18 February 1892 and completed the same year at the Napier R. & Sons shipyard in Glasgow, Scotland, United Kingdom. The ship was 91.4 metres (299 ft 10 in) long, had a beam of 11.4 metres (37 ft 5 in) and had a depth of 8 metres (26 ft 3 in). She was assessed at 2,034 GRT and had 1 x 3 cyl. Triple expansion engine driving a single screw propeller. The ship could generate 510 n.h.p. with a speed of 16 knots.

== Early career ==
El Kahira passed through several owners during her career but always kept her name whether it being as a Passenger or Cargo ship. During the First World War she was used as a troop transport ship, most notably transporting troops of the 1st Battalion (4th Gurkha Rifles) from Mudros, Greece to Alexandria, Egypt in 1915 for participation in the Gallipoli campaign.

== Sinking ==
El Kahira departed London, United Kingdom bound for Algiers, Algeria on 7 July 1922 while carrying a cargo of 1,310 tons of bagged sugar and one passenger along with her crew of 28 including Captain Pepperell. She was last seen passing St. Catherine's Point, Isle of Wight by the captain and two officers of the SS Staffa on the afternoon of 8 July. The weather had already started to get rough by that time and the crew of Staffa reported seeing structural damage to El Kahira in the form of twisted rails, broken stanchions and part of the boat deck missing. During the night of 8 July, the bad weather turned into a gale with heavy rain and large waves which lasted until the following day. It is believed El Kahira sank sometime during the storm with the loss of all hands. The only body recovered, was that of Captain Pepperell who had washed up ashore at Cap Gris Nez, Pas-de-Calais, France on 1 August with his jacket following his example on 7 August.

== Inquiry ==
An inquiry was held concerning the disappearance and probable sinking of the El Kahira starting on 18 September 1923. They discovered that the ship was unfit to be at sea due to several factors including the fact that she had prior to her voyage been moored on the river Thames for two years without a drydock inspection. Along with defective boilers and only two out of six lifeboats which were actually serviceable with the lifeboat launching equipment being defective. Her saloon area from her days as a passenger ship had also been converted into an extra cargo hold although its placement could upset the ships balance and threaten to capsize her in severe weather conditions if not secured. It was reported that the wenches keeping the cargo in the saloon from shifting were worn out to the point of being ineffective. It was also discovered that the ship hadn't been equipped yet with a wireless installation although it had been required by law at the time.

A partner of Trading & Coaling Co. named Ernest Olivier along with Captain B. Swinhoe-Stodhart who was Marine Superintendent of the company were seen as most responsible for the sinking of El Kahira. During the final verdict both were found guilty of negligence as they failed to properly prepare the ship as a seaworthy vessel and the failure to equip the ship with a wireless installation. The main reasoning behind the decisions of the company was to intern El Kahira at Piraeus to be sold of as the 30 year old ship had become more of a floating wreck than a ship when she had completed her final voyage to Algiers. Ernest Olivier was seen as primarily responsible for the loss of El Kahira and was ordered to pay 200 Guineas to cover the costs of the investigation.

== Wreck ==
The wreck of El Kahira lies at (50°15′N 01°54′W). At a depth of 60 metres (196 ft 10 in) with her bow facing north east. The wreck stands 7 metres (23 ft 0 in) tall on the gravel seabed with her boilers and engine although broken and displaced still forming the highest parts of the wreck.
