= Franz von Suppé =

Austrian composer (1819–1895)

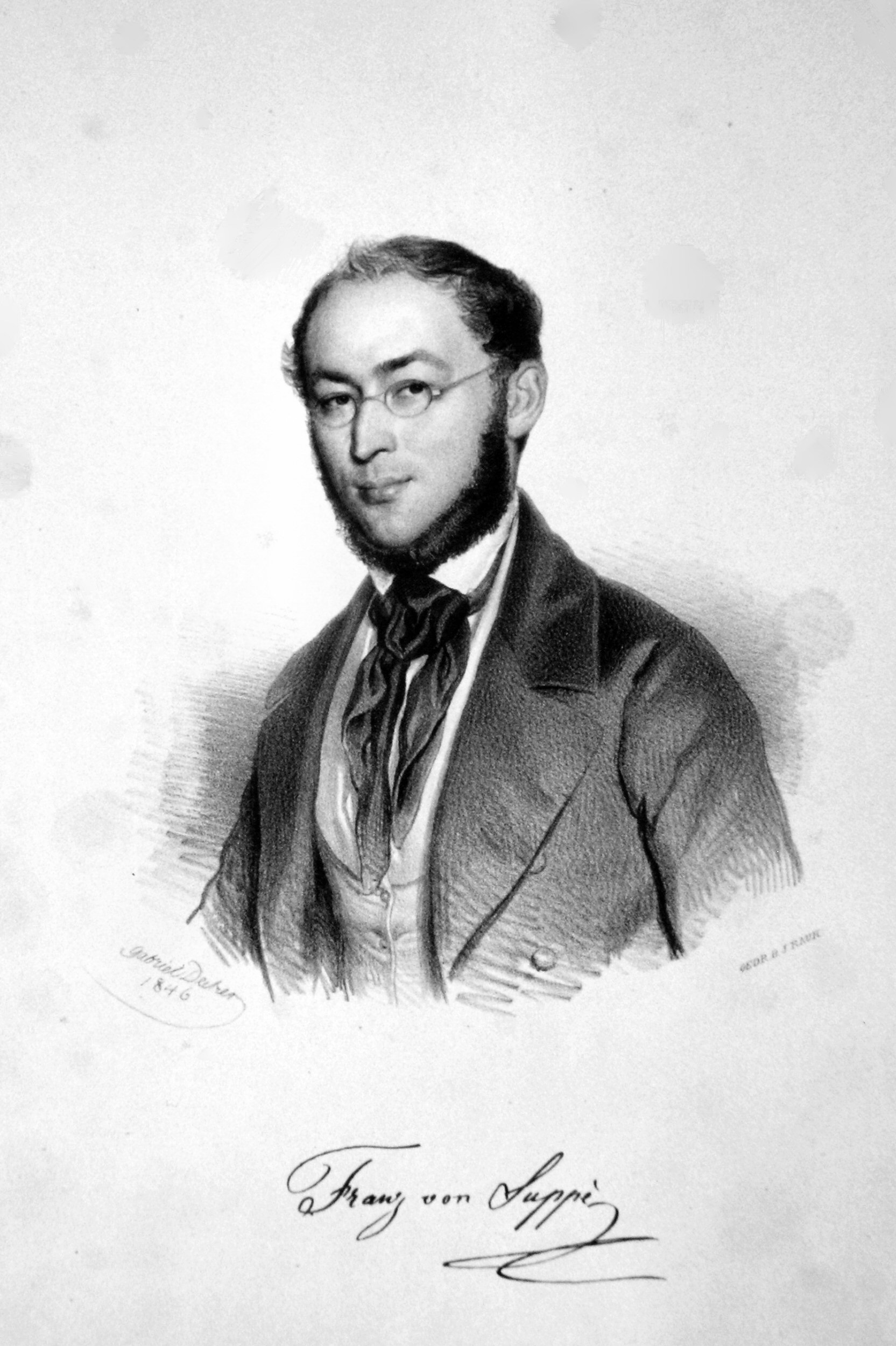
Suppé, 1846

Franz von Suppé, born Francesco Ezechiele Ermenegildo Cavaliere Suppé Demelli (18 April 1819 – 21 May 1895) was an Austrian composer of light operas and other theatre music. He came from the Kingdom of Dalmatia, Austro-Hungarian Empire (now part of Croatia). A composer and conductor of the Romantic period, he is notable for his four dozen operettas, including the first operetta to a German libretto. Some of them remain in the repertory, particularly in German-speaking countries, and he composed a substantial quantity of church music, but he is now chiefly known for his overtures, which remain popular in the concert hall and on record. Among the best-known are Poet and Peasant, Light Cavalry, Morning, Noon, and Night in Vienna and Pique Dame.

== Life and career ==
Suppé's parents named him Francesco Ezechiele Ermenegildo Cavaliere Suppé Demelli when he was born on 18 April 1819 in Spalato, now Split, Dalmatia, Croatia. His father – like his father before him – was a civil servant in the Austrian Empire. Suppé's mother was born in Vienna.

The facts of Suppé's early years are disputed. Both during his lifetime and after his death various unfounded statements circulated about his background. The first edition of Grove's Dictionary of Music and Musicians (1884) incorrectly states that the Suppés were of Belgian descent, that Suppé was born in 1820 aboard a ship at Spalato, and that his full name was Francesco Ezechiele Ermenegildo Cavaliere Suppe Demelli. Other incorrect information is given in a 1905 biography of Suppé by Otto Keller, husband of one of the composer's granddaughters, based on the unreliable recollections of Suppé's widow. (Note: Further information from research by Andreas Weigel published in the Oesterreichisches Musiklexikon is that Suppe's mother's maiden name was Jandovsky or Jandowsky (not Landovsky nor Landowsky, as usually given), and that Suppé lied about or embellished very many things in his biography to a degree rare in music history (for example about his education and when he met his wives).)

Suppé spent his childhood in Zara, now Zadar, where he had his first music lessons and began to compose at an early age. As a boy he had encouragement in music from a local bandmaster and the Zara cathedral choirmaster. As a teenager in Zara, Suppé studied flute and harmony. According to some accounts his father wanted him to be a lawyer, and sent him to study in Padua, from where he supposedly visited Milan and met Rossini, Donizetti and Verdi and attended performances of their operas. (Note: This is demonstrably untrue so far as Verdi is concerned: his first opera, Oberto, was not produced until four years after Suppé moved to Vienna.) By another account he studied philosophy in Padua and studied law later in Vienna.

After Suppé's father died in 1835 the family moved to Vienna, where Suppé studied music under Ignaz von Seyfried, a pupil of Mozart. Suppé played the flute in various orchestras and taught Italian. (His mother tongue was Italian, and although he learned to speak German fluently he did so with what one journalist called "a decided Italian accent".) In 1837 and 1841 he wrote two operas, neither of which was performed but both of which may have been influenced by Donizetti, allegedly a distant relation of the Suppés.

Suppé was in many ways the father of Viennese operetta, yet today he is principally known for his overtures. If only people would ask: "Overtures to what?" Overtures to many delightful operettas which, for the most part, go unperformed today.

— Richard Traubner
Operetta: A Theatrical History

From 1840 Suppé worked as a composer and conductor for Franz Pokorny, the director of several theatres in Vienna, Pressburg (now Bratislava), Ödenburg (now Sopron) and Baden bei Wien. In Operetta: A Theatrical History (1983), Richard Traubner writes that 24 November 1860 is considered by many to be "the birthdate of the true Viennese operetta", with the production of Suppé's Das Pensionat (The Boarding School) at the Theater an der Wien. Pokorny's son, Alois, who ran the theatre, did not have enough money to buy the rights for the first Viennese productions of Offenbach's operas, and he presented instead Das Pensionat, which had, by the standards of the time, an excellent run: it was played for 20 nights in succession, and 34 times in all during the six months it remained in the repertoire. Das Pensionat was the first operetta composed to an original German text, and the first Viennese operetta to be heard abroad: there were productions in Germany and Hungary, and in November 1861 it was given (in German) at the Stadt Theater, New York. Suppé was heavily influenced by Offenbach; he studied Offenbach's works carefully and wrote many successful operettas using them as a model. The operetta specialist Richard Traubner writes that Suppé's early works frankly imitated Offenbach's. Das Pensionat not only emulates Offenbach, but refers to him in the first act, when the heroine, the schoolgirl Sophie, and her friends learn about the can-can and proceed to dance it.

Suppé's most enduring one-act success, Die schöne Galathée (The Beautiful Galatea), dates from 1865. It was modelled, Traubner comments, in both title and style, on Offenbach's La belle Hélène which had been a great success in Vienna earlier that year. It has had frequent revivals throughout German-speaking countries, and was played in German and in English translation in both New York and London. A full-length operatic success eluded Suppé for some years, and it was not until after the triumph of Johann Strauss's Die Fledermaus in 1874 that he caught up. His Fatinitza (1876) was a critical and box office success, not only in Vienna but in London and Paris, though less so in New York, where it coincided with and was somewhat eclipsed by the first production there of H.M.S. Pinafore. Suppé surpassed the success of Fatinitza in 1879 with Boccaccio and had his final lasting success in 1880 with Donna Juanita. Traubner writes, "nothing after Donna Juanita has endured, though several were very popular in their time": Der Gascogner (Theater an der Wien, 22 March 1881) was an outright failure, but Die Afrikareise (A Trip to Africa, Theater an der Wien, 17 March 1883) ran for a month, and received several productions, including an American revival with Lillian Russell in the lead, which ran for five weeks in 1887.

Suppé wrote music for over a hundred productions at the Theater in der Josefstadt as well as the Carltheater in Leopoldstadt, and at the Theater an der Wien. He also worked on some landmark opera productions, such as the 1846 production of Meyerbeer's Les Huguenots with Jenny Lind.

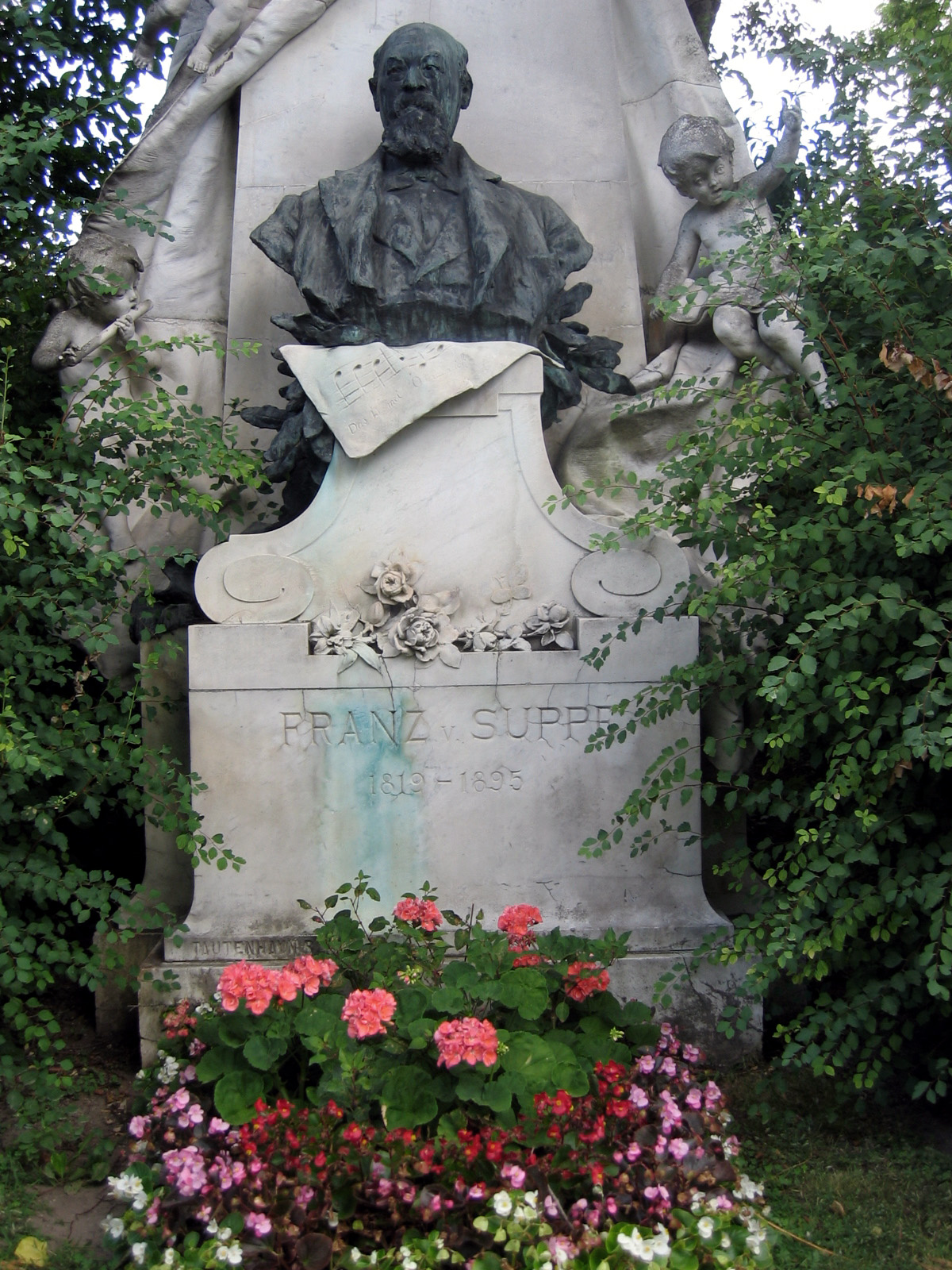
Suppé's grave at the Zentralfriedhof, Vienna

Suppé was twice married: first to Therese Merville, and after she died in 1865 to Sofie Strasser. He died in Vienna on 21 May 1895, at the age of 76.

== Works ==
Suppé composed about 30 operettas and 180 farces, ballets, and other stage works. Although some of the overtures remain popular the bulk of his operettas have sunk into obscurity. Exceptions include Boccaccio, Die schöne Galathée and Fatinitza; Peter Branscombe, writing in The New Grove Dictionary of Music and Musicians, characterises Suppé's song "O du mein Österreich" as "Austria's second national song".

Suppé retained links with his native Dalmatia, occasionally visiting Split (Spalato), Zadar (Zara), and Šibenik. Some of his works are linked with the region, in particular his operetta Des Matrosen Heimkehr, the action of which takes place in Hvar. After retiring from conducting, Suppé continued to write stage works, but increasingly shifted his interest to sacred music. He wrote a Requiem for Pokorny in 1855; an oratorio, Extremum Judicium; three masses, among them the Missa Dalmatica; songs; symphonies; and concert overtures. When the Requiem Mass was published in 1997, a reviewer found that it reveals Suppé's admiration for Mozart's Requiem, "from the choice of tonality (D minor), movement layout, and melodic figuration" to a direct quote in the "Mors stupebit" section of Suppé's work from the "Tuba mirum" from Mozart"s "Lacrimosa". The work was revived for a first performance in modern times by BBC Radio 3, broadcast on 5 July 1984. After Suppé's death thirty unpublished songs were found in his papers, as well as the nearly completed score of another mass.

The musicologist Robert Letellier writes that Suppé was a master of three styles, the Italian (opera buffa), the French (opéra-comique) and the German: "He knew how to blend them irresistibly, assisted in the instrumentation by his rich experience as a theatre orchestra conductor, and with a sure symphonic technique deriving from his classical training." Letellier comments that Suppé's overtures were a major feature of his operatic works: "some attaining immense popularity, and securing him an enduring fame in the concert hall ... Poet and Peasant and Light Cavalry are among the most famous overtures ever written". To these, the music critic Andrew Lamb adds as outstanding among Suppé's overtures those to Ein Morgen, ein Mittag und ein Abend in Wien (Morning, Noon, and Night in Vienna, 1844), Pique Dame (Queen of Spades, 1862), Flotte Bursche (Jolly Students, 1863), and Banditenstreiche (Bandits' Pranks, 1867).

=== Recordings ===
There are many sets of Suppé overtures on disc, but few of his stage works. A complete recording of Die schöne Galatée conducted by Bruno Weil was issued in 2005, the Lehár Festival in Bad Ischl staged and recorded Fatinitza in 2006, Dario Salvi and the Janáček Philharmonic Orchestra have recorded Suppé's incidental music for Die Reise um die Erde in 80 Tagen (Around the World in 80 Days) and Mozart. The Requiem was recorded in 1997 with soloists and the Cracow Philharmonic Chorus and Orchestra conducted by Roland Bader. The Musical Times described it as an accomplished piece and singled out the quieter passages "such as the obsessive orchestral motif that backs the Liber scriptus, the lovely oboe solo at the beginning of Recordare, or the high violins irradiating the brief Sanctus".

Collections of Suppé overtures have been recorded by conductors including Sir John Barbirolli, Charles Dutoit, Neeme Järvi, Herbert von Karajan, Sir Neville Marriner, Zubin Mehta, Paul Paray and Sir Georg Solti. The most extensive recorded collection is in six volumes on the Marco Polo label, released between 1994 and 2001 with the Slovak State Philharmonic Orchestra and various conductors.

== Surname ==
Most sources have spelled the name with an acute accent. Recently an alternative spelling with a grave accent has sometimes been used, on the grounds that Suppé used it when signing his name (see lead image, above); his name is written with the acute accent on his tombstone and in the baptismal registry it was written without any accent. (Note: The lack of clarity about which accent should be used to spell Suppé's surname arises because in Italian both grave and acute accents exist but, until the 20th century, there was no precise rule about their use. In the 16th century most writers and printers used only the grave accent on the last vowel of words and names and the acute accent on internal vowels, but since this seldom occurs in Italian the grave was effectively the only accent in use. The orthography started stabilising only after the birth of the Kingdom of Italy, when Italians began using the acute accent to denote close-mid vowels (/e/ and /o/) to distinguish them from open-mid vowels (/ɛ/ and /ɔ/), and the grave accent in all the other cases, following a use that already existed but was not the most common until then.)

== Partial list of works ==
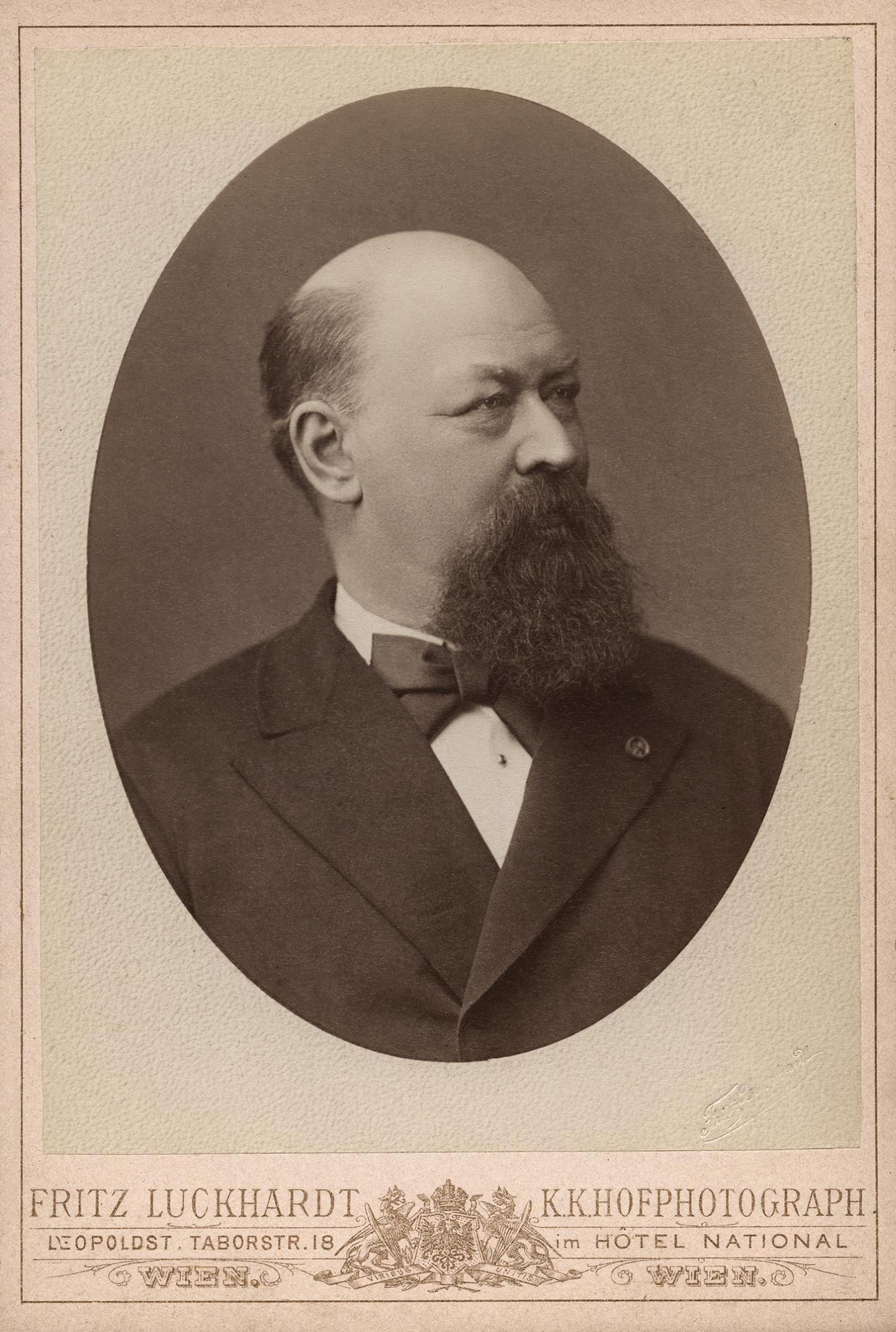
Suppé (by Fritz Luckhardt)

- Virginia (opera, L. Holt), 1837, not performed
- Gertrude della valle (opera, G. Brazzanovich), 1841, not performed
- Jung lustig, im Alter traurig, oder Die Folgen der Erziehung (comedy with songs, 3 acts, C. Wallis), TJ, 5 March 1841
- Die Hammerschmiedin aus Steyermark, oder Folgen einer Landpartie (local farce with songs, 2 acts, J. Schickh), Theater in der Josefstadt, 14 October 1842
- Ein Morgen, ein Mittag und ein Abend in Wien (local play with songs, 2 acts), Theater in der Josefstadt, 26 February 1844
- Marie, die Tochter des Regiments (vaudeville, 2 acts, F. Blum, after J. H. St Georges and J. F. A. Bayard), Theater in der Josefstadt, 13 June 1844
- Der Krämer und sein Kommis (farce with songs, 2 acts, F. Kaiser), Theater in der Josefstadt, 28 September 1844
- Die Müllerin von Burgos (vaudeville, 2 acts, J. Kupelwieser), Theater in der Josefstadt, 8 March 1845
- Sie ist verheiratet (comedy with songs, 3 acts, Kaiser), Theater an der Wien, 7 November 1845
- Dichter und Bauer (comedy with songs, 3 acts, K. Elmar), Theater an der Wien, 24 August 1846, full score (1900)
- Das Mädchen vom Lande (opera, 3 acts, Elmar), Theater an der Wien, 7 August 1847
- Martl, oder Der Portiunculatag in Schnabelhausen (farce with music, parody of Flotow: Martha, 3 acts, A. Berla), Theater an der Wien, 16 December 1848
- Des Teufels Brautfahrt, oder Böser Feind und guter Freund (magic farce with songs, 3 acts, Elmar), Theater an der Wien, 30 January 1849
- Gervinus, der Narr von Untersberg, oder Ein patriotischer Wunsch (farce with songs, 3 acts, Berla), Braunhirschen-Arena [and Theater an der Wien], 1 July 1849
- Unterthänig und unabhängig, oder Vor und nach einem Jahre (comedy with songs, 3 acts, Elmar), Theater an der Wien, 13 October 1849
- s'Alraunl (romantic tale with songs, 3 acts, A. von Klesheim), Theater an der Wien, 13 November 1849
- Der Dumme hat's Glück (farce with songs, 3 acts, Berla), Theater an der Wien, 29 June 1850
- Dame Valentine, oder Frauenräuber und Wanderbursche (Singspiel, 3 acts, Elmar), Theater an der Wien, 9 January 1851
- Der Tannenhäuser (dramatic poem with music, H. von Levitschnigg), Theater an der Wien, 27 February 1852
- Wo steckt der Teufel? (farce with songs, 3 acts, ?Grün), Theater an der Wien, 28 June 1854
- Paragraph 3 (opera, 3 acts, M. A. Grandjean), Hofoper, 8 January 1858
- Das Pensionat (operetta, 1 acts, C. K.), Theater an der Wien, 24 November 1860, vocal score (n.d.)
- Die Kartenschlägerin (Pique-Dame) (operetta, 1 act), Kaitheater, 26 April 1862
- Zehn Mädchen und kein Mann (operetta, 1 act, W. Friedrich), Kaitheater, 25 October 1862, vocal score (n.d.)
- Flotte Bursche (operetta, 1, J. Braun), Kaitheater, 18 April 1863, vocal score (n.d.)
- Das Corps der Rache (operetta, 1 act, J. L. Harisch), Carltheater, 5 March 1864
- Franz Schubert (Liederspiel, 1 act, H. Max), Carltheater, 10 September 1864
- Dinorah, oder Die Turnerfahrt nach Hütteldorf (parody opera, of Meyerbeer's Dinorah, 3 acts, F. Hopp), Carltheater, 4 May 1865
- Die schöne Galathée (The Beautiful Galatea) (comic-mythological operetta, l act, Poly Henrion), Berlin, Meysels-Theater, 30 June 1865, vocal score (n.d.)
- Leichte Kavallerie or Die Tochter der Puszta (operetta, 2 acts, C. Costa), Carltheater, 21 March 1866
- Freigeister (operetta, 2, Costa), Carltheater, 23 October 1866
- Banditenstreiche (operetta, 1 act, B. Boutonnier), Carltheater, 27 April 1867
- Die Frau Meisterin (magic operetta, 3, Costa), Carltheater, 20 January 1868, vocal score (Leipzig, n.d.)
- Isabella (operetta, J. Weyl), Carltheater, 5 November 1869
- Tantalusqualen (operetta), Carltheater, 3 October 1868
- Lohengelb oder Die Jungfrau von Dragant (parody operetta of Wagner's Lohengrin, 3 acts, Costa, Grandjean), Carltheater, 30 November 1870
- Canebas (operetta, 1 act, J. Doppler), Carltheater, 2 November 1872
- Fatinitza (operetta, 3 acts, F. Zell, R. Genée), Carltheater, 5 January 1876, full score (n.d.)
- Der Teufel auf Erden (fantastic operetta, 3 acts, J. Hopp), Carltheater, 5 January 1878, vocal score (London, n.d.)
- Boccaccio (operetta, 3 acts, Zell, Genée), Carltheater, 1 February 1879, full score (Hamburg, n.d.)
- Donna Juanita (operetta, 3 acts, Zell, Genée), Carltheater, 21 February 1880, full score (Brussels, n.d.); arr. K. Pauspertl as Die grosse Unbekannte, 1925
- Der Gascogner (operetta, 3 acts, Zell, Genée), Carltheater, 21 or ?22 March 1881, vocal score (Hamburg, n.d.)
- Das Herzblättchen (operetta, 3 acts, C. Tetzlaff), Carltheater, 4 February 1882
- Die Afrikareise (operetta, 3 acts, M. West, Genée, O. F. Berg), Theater an der Wien, 17 March 1883, full score (Hamburg, n.d.)
- Des Matrosen Heimkehr (romantic opera, 2 acts, A. Langner), Hamburg, 4 May 1885, vocal score (Hamburg, 1885)
- Bellman (comic opera, 3 acts, West, L. Held), Theater an der Wien, 26 or ?24 February 1887
- Joseph Haydn (musical portrait with melodies by Haydn, F. von Radler), Theater in der Josefstadt, 30 April 1887
- Die Jagd nach dem Glücke (operetta, 3 acts, Genée, B. Zappert), Carltheater, 27 October 1888, full score (Hamburg, n.d.)
- Das Modell (operetta, 3 acts, V. Leon, Held), Carltheater, 4 October 1895, full score (Leipzig, n.d.) [completed by J. Stern and A. Zamara]
- Die Pariserin, oder Das heimliche Bild (operetta, 3 acts, Léon, Held), Carltheater, 26 January 1898 [arr. of Die Frau Meisterin, 1868]

== See also ==
- List of Austrians in music

== Notes, references and sources ==
=== Sources ===
- Gänzl, Kurt; Andrew Lamb (1988). Gänzl's Book of the Musical Theatre. London: The Bodley Head. OCLC 966051934.
- Gänzl, Kurt (2001). The Encyclopedia of Musical Theatre. New York: Schirmer Books. ISBN 978-0-02-865573-4.
- Grove, George (1890) [1884]. "Suppe, von". In Grove, George (ed.). A Dictionary of Music and Musicians. Vol. IV. London and New York: Macmillan. pp. 3–4. OCLC 916421702 – via Internet Archive.
- Gammond, Peter (1980). Offenbach. London: Omnibus Press. ISBN 978-0-7119-0257-2.
- Holden, Amanda, ed. (1997). The Penguin Opera Guide. London: Penguin. ISBN 978-0-14-051385-1.
- Letellier, Robert (2013). Franz von Suppé: Overtures and Preludes. Newcastle upon Tyne: Cambridge Scholars. ISBN 978-1-44-384460-4.
- March, Ivan, ed. (2008). The Penguin Guide to Recorded Classical Music 2009. London: Penguin. ISBN 978-0-141-03335-8.
- Senelick, Laurence (2017). Jacques Offenbach and the Making of Modern Culture. Cambridge: Cambridge University Press. ISBN 978-0-52-187180-8.
- Traubner, Richard (1983). Operetta: A Theatrical History. London: Gollancz. ISBN 978-0-57-503338-2.
