= May 1922 =

Month of 1922

<<	May 1922					>>
Su	Mo	Tu	We	Th	Fr	Sa
	1	2	3	4	5	6
7	8	9	10	11	12	13
14	15	16	17	18	19	20
21	22	23	24	25	26	27
28	29	30	31

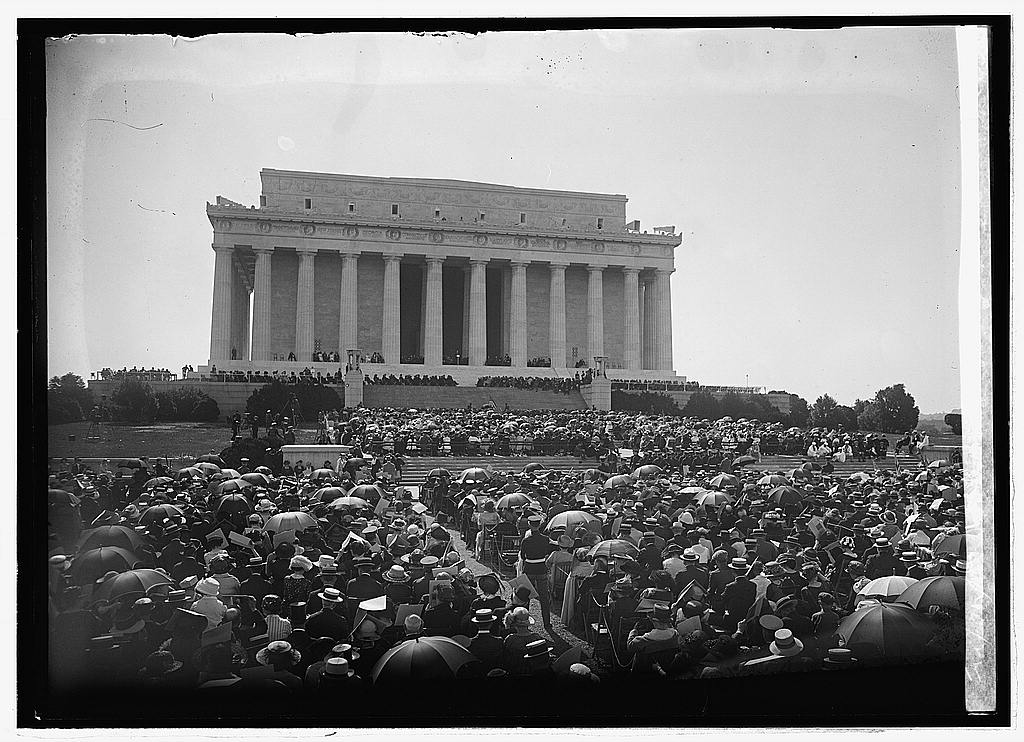
May 30, 1922: U.S. President Harding dedicates the Lincoln Memorial

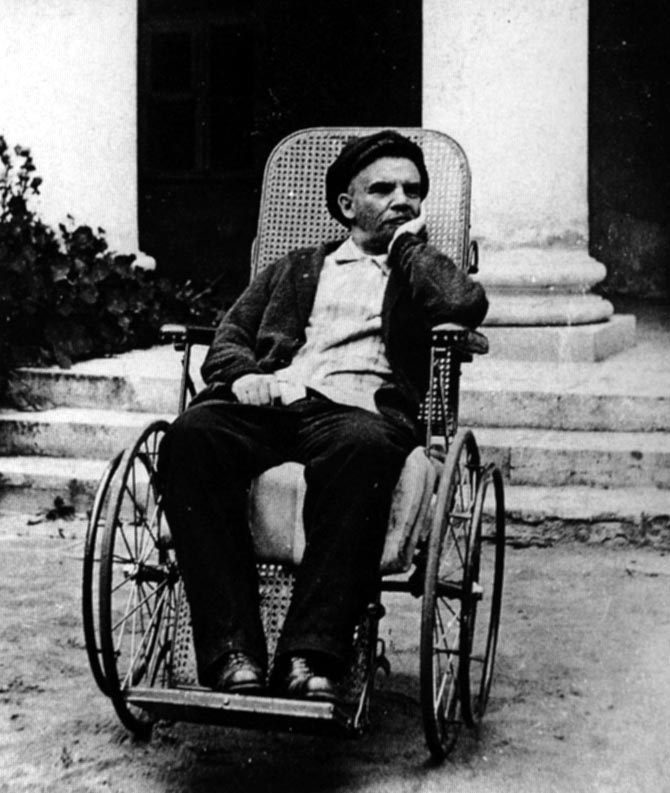
May 24, 1922: Soviet Communist Party leader Vladimir Lenin debilitated by first of several strokes

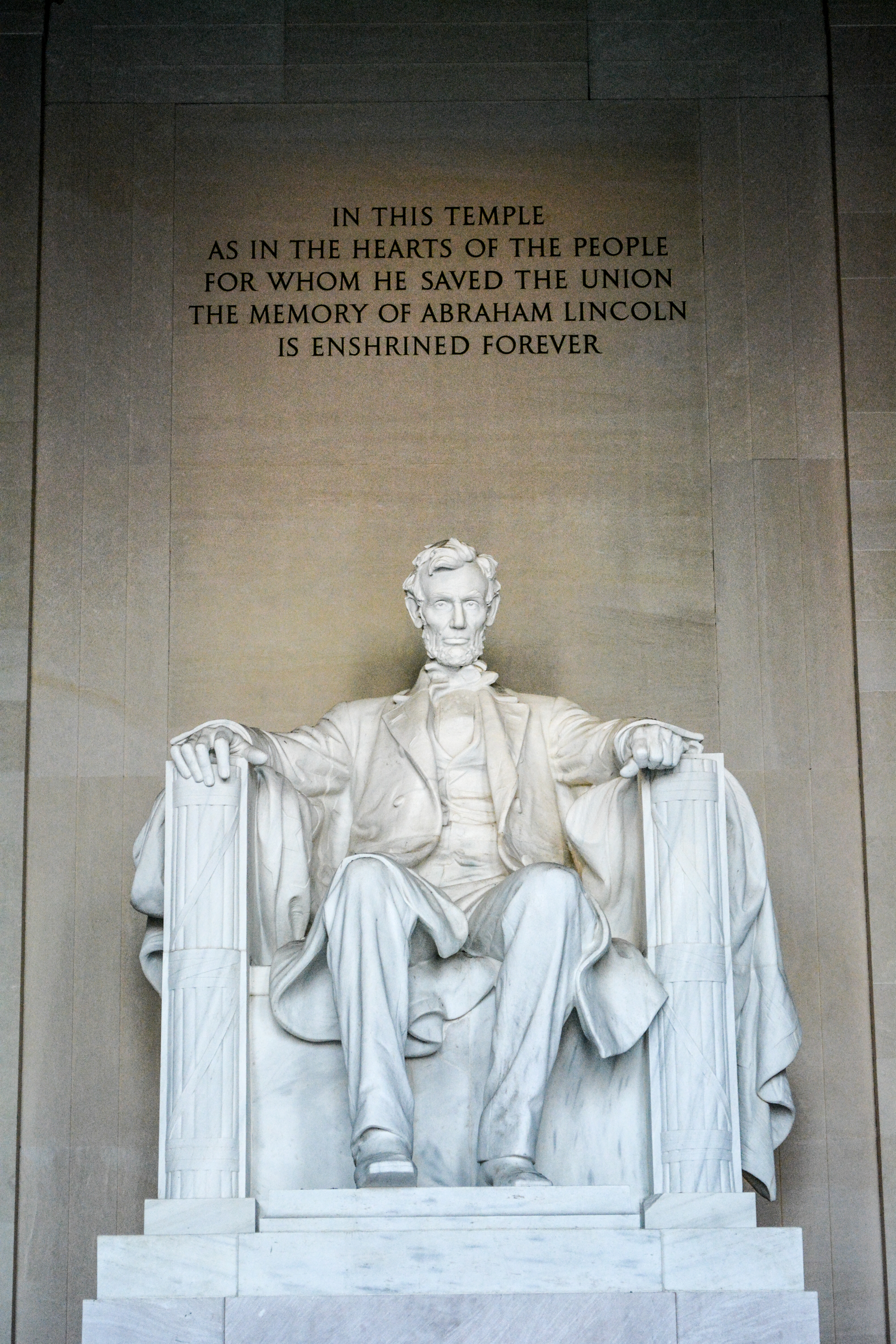
Sculpture of Lincoln unveiled

The following events occurred in May 1922:

== May 1, 1922 (Monday) ==
- Deruluft (Deutsch-Russische Luftverkehrs A.G.), an international air carrier started jointly by the governments of Germany and the Soviet Union, flew for the first time, with a flight from the Soviet city of Moscow to the German Prussian city of Königsberg, with stops in the Russian city of Smolensk and the Lithuanian city of Kaunas.
- It was Budget Day in the United Kingdom. Chancellor of the Exchequer Robert Horne estimated a surplus of £38 million and cut 1 shilling off income tax and 4 pence off a pound of tea, as well as lowering postal and telephone rates.
- Korean children's author Bang Jeong-Hwan and seven other people established the first "Children's Day" in Japanese-occupied Korea. After Korea's liberation from Japan, observance of Eorininal (어린이날) the occasion would be moved to May 5, and would become a South Korean national holiday beginning May 5, 1975.
- CKOC, the oldest continuously operating radio station in Canada, went on the air in Hamilton, Ontario.
- Born:
  - Vitaly Popkov, Soviet Air Force flying ace with 40 victories during World War II; in Moscow, Russian SFSR, Soviet Union) (d. 2010)
  - Sofia Ferreira, Portuguese Communist and dissident who was imprisoned by the government from 1949 to 1953 and from 1959 to 1968; in Alhandra, Portugal (d. 2010)
  - Ruth Brinker, American AIDS activist who founded the relief organization Project Open Hand; as Ruth Appel, in Hartford, South Dakota, United States (d. 2011)

== May 2, 1922 (Tuesday) ==
- The Venezuelan Congress unanimously elected Juan Vicente Gómez president.
- American-born dancer Isadora Duncan and the Russian poet Sergei Yesenin were married in Moscow.
- The Dutch comic Bulletje en Boonestaak first appeared.
- Born:
  - Roscoe Lee Browne, American character actor and director; in Woodbury, New Jersey, United States (d. 2007)
  - A. M. Rosenthal, Canadian-born American journalist and executive editor of The New York Times from 1977 to 1978; as Abraham Michael Rosenthal, in Sault Ste. Marie, Ontario, Canada (d. 2006)
- Died:
  - Richard Theodore Greener, 78, American scholar of elocution, philosophy, law and classics, was the first African American undergraduate to receive a bachelor's degree from Harvard University in 1870 (b. 1844)
  - Mary Annette Anderson, 47, American professor of grammar and history, the first African American woman to be elected to the Phi Beta Kappa honor society, died after a short illness. (b. 1874)

== May 3, 1922 (Wednesday) ==
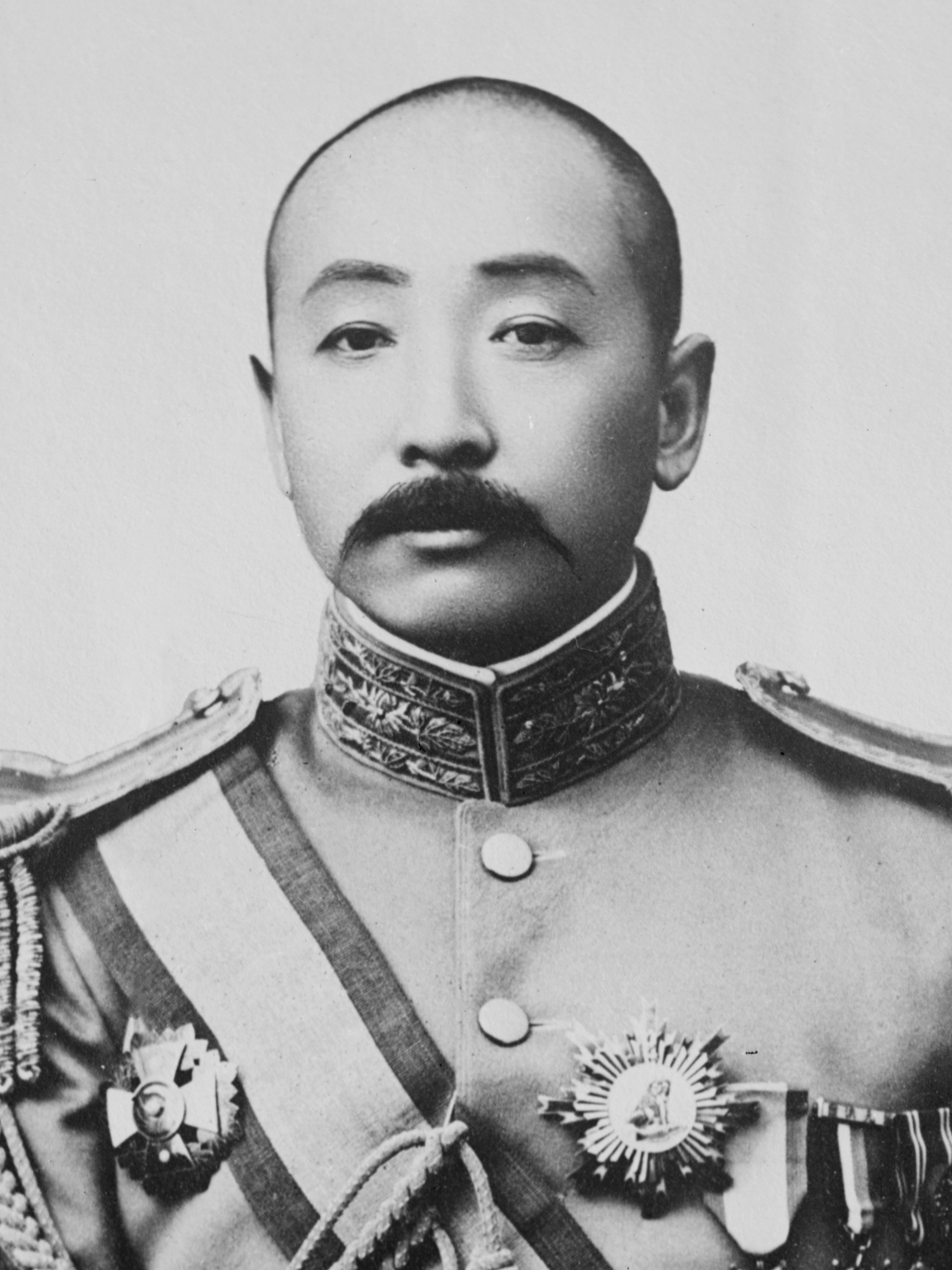
General Zhang Zuolin

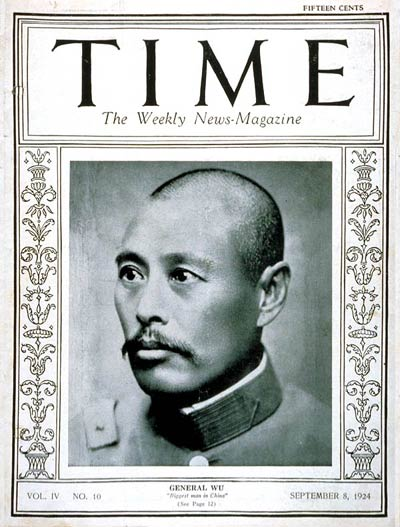
General Wu Peifu

- General Zhang Zuolin's headquarters issued a triumphant statement reporting that rival warlord Wu Peifu had been killed by artillery fire. This report proved to be false.
- Born:
  - Robert De Niro Sr., abstract expressionist painter, father of actor Robert De Niro; in Syracuse, New York, United States (d. 1993)
  - John J. Voll, American career officer in the United States Air Force and flying ace with 21 victories in World War II; in Cincinnati, United States (d. 1987)

== May 4, 1922 (Thursday) ==
- The city of Austin, capital of the U.S. state of Texas, was hit by two different tornadoes in the space of half an hour. The first one, an F2 storm, passed through a largely rural area on the west side of Austin, and largely distracted people from the formation of a second, more powerful F4 storm that swept through the eastern half of the city, and killed at least 12 people.
- Outside of Kirvin, Texas, the body of a missing 17-year-old white girl Eula Ausley was found. She had been sexually assaulted and beaten to death. Local townspeople immediately formed a posse to hunt down the assailant under the assumption that she had been killed by a black person.
- Born:
  - Eugenie Clark, American ichthyologist, conservationist and marine biologist; in New York City (d. 2015)
  - Philip Lett, American mechanical engineer who oversaw the development of the M1 Abrams tank; in Newton, Alabama, United States (d. 2014)
  - Odette L. Shotwell, American organic chemist and polio survivor who developed the antibiotics azacolutin and duramycin; in Wiley, Colorado, United States (d. 1998)

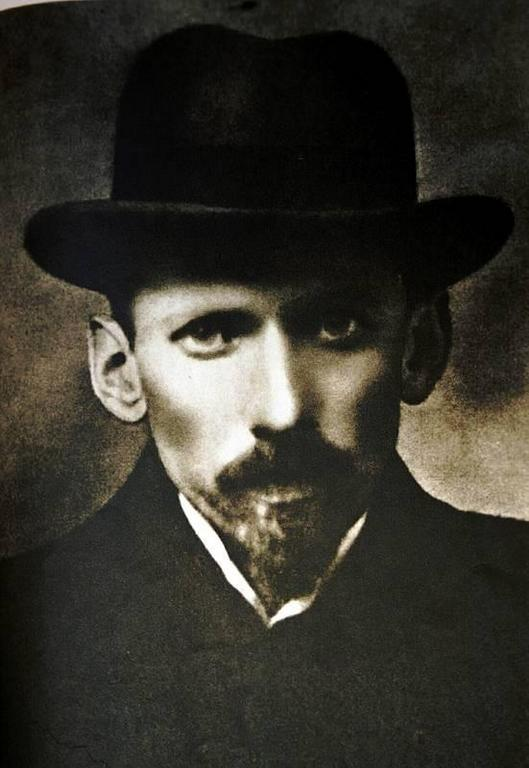
Viktor Kingissepp

- Died:
  - Viktor Kingissepp, 34, Estonian politician and leader of the Estonian Communist Party. was arrested and executed by Estonian authorities two days after leading a May Day protest in Tallinn. (b. 1888)
  - Joseph N. McCormack, 74, American surgeon, served as President of the American Medical Association (AMA) who reorganized the AMA into a confederation of the state medical associations in the U.S. and provided the basis for common policies for physician certification and conduct, died of a cerebral hemorrhage. (b. 1847)
  - Asle Gronna, 63, American politician, served as U.S. Representative from North Dakota from 1905 to 1911, and U.S. Senator from North Dakota from 1911 to 1921, was one of only six Senators to vote against declaring war on Germany in 1917 (b. 1858)

== May 5, 1922 (Friday) ==
- Near Kirvin, Texas, an African American suspect was arrested in connection with the Ausley murder. The county sheriff attempted to drive the suspect to Waco, but a gathering lynch mob blocked the road so he drove him to the county jail in Fairfield instead. There the suspect allegedly confessed and implicated two other African American men who were also arrested. The white mob soon gathered around the Fairfield jail and demanded the prisoners be handed over.
- Born:
  - Adil Çarçani, Albanian politician, served as the last Communist Prime Minister of Albania from 1981 to 1991; in Fushëbardhë, Principality of Albania (d. 1997)
  - Arnold Cook, blind Australian economics professor who established the first guide dog training center in Australia; in Narrogin, Western Australia, Australia (d. 1981)
  - J. D. "Jay" Miller, American record producer and songwriter; as Joseph Denton Miller, in Iota, Louisiana, United States (d. 1996)
  - Monica Lewis, American jazz singer and actress; as May Lewis, in Chicago, United States (d. 2015)

== May 6, 1922 (Saturday) ==
- The First Zhili–Fengtian War appeared to have ended in a Zhili clique victory. Wu Peifu ordered the arrest of several prominent officials, including Liang Shiyi.
- Snap Curry, Mose Jones and Johnny Cornish, the three African American suspects in the murder of a 17-year-old white girl, Eula Ausley, were taken from the county jail in Fairfield, Texas by a white lynch mob (accounts vary as to whether the police handed them over willingly or not) and brought back to Kirvin, Texas. They were then burned alive in the middle of the town square at about 5:00 in the morning. Several weeks of race-related violence and murders ensued. Burning at the stake was carried against other accused African Americans during the month, including May 18 and May 20.
- The construction of Yankee Stadium began in New York City.
- Utah's first radio station, KZN in Salt Lake City, went on the air.
- Born:
  - Ralph F. Hirschmann, German-born American biochemist who guided the first synthesis of an enzyme; in Fürth, Bavaria (d. 2009)
  - Taw Phaya Gyi, Burmese prince, installed as the puppet ruler of the Japanese-occupied State of Burma from 1942 to 1945, grandson of Thibaw Min; in Rangoon, Burma Province, British India (now Yangon, Myanmar) (d. 1948, assassinated)
- Died:
  - Chhatrapati Rajarshi Shahu, 47, the first Maharaja of Kolhapur, a princely state that is now part of the Indian state of Maharashtra (b. 1874)
  - Henry Pomeroy Davison, 54, American banker, philanthropist and financier who oversaw the raising of donations to the American Red Cross during World War I, died while undergoing surgery to remove a brain tumor. (b. 1867)

== May 7, 1922 (Sunday) ==
- Jesse Barnes of the New York Giants pitched a 6-0 no-hitter against the Philadelphia Phillies at the Polo Grounds. He faced the minimum twenty-seven batters possible, but gave up a fifth-inning walk that was erased by a double play.
- Red Star Olympique defeated Stade Rennais UC, 2 to 0, in the Coupe de France Final.
- The romantic drama film Beyond the Rocks starring Gloria Swanson was released.
- Born:
  - Darren McGavin, American actor; as William Lyle Richardson, in Spokane, Washington, United States (d. 2006)
  - Wu Liangyong, Chinese architect and urban planner who oversaw the modernization of Beijing in preparation for the 2008 Summer Olympics; in Nanjing, Jiangsu, Republic of China
  - Joe O'Donnell, documentary filmmaker, photojournalist and photographer; in Johnstown, Pennsylvania, United States (d. 2007)
- Died:
  - John Henry Patterson, 77, American businessman and founder of the National Cash Register Company (b. 1844)
  - Max Wagenknecht, 64, German composer of organ and piano music (b. 1857)

== May 8, 1922 (Monday) ==
- Eight Russian priests, two laymen and a woman, all in the town of Shuya were sentenced to death in the Soviet Union for resisting the state confiscation of church property and for alleged participation in disturbances. Although Vladimir Lenin demanded execution and Leon Trotsky concurred, Soviet Communist Politburo member Lev Kamenev intervened in the sentence, saving the lives of the three laypersons and three of the priests.
- Born:
  - Bernardin Gantin, Beninese Roman Catholic prelate who held senior positions in the Roman Curia for 20 years and the highest position in the College of Cardinals for 9 years; in Toffo, French Dahomey (now Benin) (d. 2008)
  - Benedicto Kiwanuka, Ugandan politician and statesman, served as the first Prime Minister of Uganda from March to April 1962; in Kisabwa village, Uganda Protectorate (d. 1972 from torture)
  - Tupua Tamasese Lealofi IV, Samoan politician and statesman, served as the Prime Minister of Western Samoa from 1970 to 1973 and from 1975 to 1976; in Apia, Western Samoa Trust Territory (now Samoa) (d. 1983)
- Died: Vincent Morrelli, 35, Italian-born American gangster and underboss of the Morello crime family in New York City, was killed in a drive-by shooting near his home in Manhattan. (b. 1886)

== May 9, 1922 (Tuesday) ==
- The engagement of movie idol Rudolph Valentino and a studio costume designer, Winifred Hudnut (who went by the stage name Natacha Rabmova) was announced after Valentino's wife Jean Acker had obtained a judgment of divorce in California.
- The U.S. state of South Dakota got its first licensed radio station, WCAT of Rapid City.
- Died: Charlotte Eilersgaard, 64, Danish novelist and women's rights advocate (b. 1858)

== May 10, 1922 (Wednesday) ==
- Ivy Williams became the first woman in the United Kingdom to be admitted to the practice of law.
- The Council of Ambassadors ordered Germany to pay 9 million marks as compensation for the zeppelin dirigibles that had been destroyed instead of being handed over to the Allies under the terms of the Treaty of Versailles.
- After the death of two policemen in Chicago, the police department there raided the headquarters of various union halls in the city and arrested 200 officials including "Big Tim" Murphy (an organized crime figure who controlled multiple unions in the city), Teamsters founder Cornelius Shea and "Frenchy" Mader, president of the Chicago Building and Construction Trades Council.
- The United States annexed the Kingman Reef, an uninhabited island that is part of the Line Islands in the South Pacific Ocean, as U.S. territory. Although the reef itself has an area of 6.9 square miles (18 km^{2}), more than 98% of the reef's surface, nearly all of it except for 0.12 square miles (0.31 km^{2}) or 7.41 acres (3.00 ha) is submerged at high tide. After arriving on the motor ship Palmyra Lorrin A. Thurston, an agent of the Palmyra Copra Company, raised the American flag and read a proclamation that declared that he was taking formal possession "on behalf of the United States of America" and claiming exclusive rights for the company for its use, acting under the authority of the Guano Islands Act of 1856.
- Former U.S. Secretary of State, Elihu Root, and U.S. Commerce Secretary, Herbert Hoover, addressed a meeting of prominent citizens at the invitation of the Russell Sage Foundation to urge support for the Foundation's project of planning for the managed growth of New York City over the next 100 years, as Root outlined his vision for the metropolis in the year 2022.
- Born: Nancy Walker, American TV actress and comedian; as Anna Myrtle Swoyer, in Philadelphia (d. 1992)

== May 11, 1922 (Thursday) ==
- Dimitrios Gounaris, the Prime Minister of Greece, won a vote of confidence by the margin of only one vote, 161 to 160.
- The 62-year-old Lackawanna Steel Company, at one time second only to U.S. Steel as the largest steel producer in the world, was purchased by Bethlehem Steel Company after having suffered heavy financial losses. Though the merger was initially opposed by the Federal Trade Commission as a violation of the Sherman Antitrust Act, U.S. Attorney General Harry M. Daugherty would decide against opposing the acquisition and Lackawanna Steel would become a subsidiary of Bethlehem Steel on October 10.
- Problems continued in the attempt to make the first aerial crossing of the South Atlantic, as Portuguese aviators Gago Coutinho and Sacadura Cabral attempted to resume their Portugal to Brazil crossing by flying back to the point where their original Fairey III seaplane, Lusitania had been wrecked on April 17. Departing in a replacement Fairey III (the Patria) from the island of Fernando de Noronha toward the "St. Paul Rocks," an island in the Saint Peter and Saint Paul Archipelago, the aviators ran into trouble again and ditched in the ocean, then drifted until they were rescued by a British steamship, the Paris City. Ultimately, the Portuguese duo would complete the journey that began on March 30 and arrive in Rio de Janeiro in a third airplane on June 17.
- In London, Georges Carpentier knocked out Ted "Kid" Lewis in the first round to retain the World Light Heavyweight Title of boxing. The bout, which 16,000 people had paid to see and The New York Times said "people might miscall boxing," lasted only 2 minutes and 15 seconds when Lewis sat up in the ring after a sharp right hook, "with his eyes wide open but ominously glazed and looking as if he would get to his feet before the referee counted ten" but sat until he was counted out.
- Hawaii's first radio station, KGU, went on the air in Honolulu. It beat competitor KDYX by fifteen minutes.
- Born: Ameurfina Melencio-Herrera, Filipino lawyer who served as an Associate Justice of the Philippine Supreme Court; as Ameurfina Aguinaldo Melencio, in Cabanatuan, Philippine Islands (d. 2020)

== May 12, 1922 (Friday) ==
- Despite winning a vote of confidence the previous day, Dimitrios Gounaris resigned as Prime Minister of Greece along with his cabinet of ministers.
- Ellis S. Joseph and Henry Burrell, Australian naturalists and entrepreneurs who made a career of capturing live animals and selling them to zoos in other nations, set out to bring the first platypus to the United States, departing on the steamer USS West Henshaw from Sydney en route to San Francisco with five platypuses. Four of the five animals died during the voyage, but Joseph and Burrell arrived in San Francisco on June 30 and delivered the surviving platypus to the New York Zoo on July 14, 1922. The platypus survived only 49 days.
- The Council of the League of Nations voted to approve the jurisdiction of the Court of International Justice to additional nations, including Russia and Germany, as well as Turkey, Hungary and Mexico, to seek neutral resolution of international disputes as an alternative to war. "Today's decision by the council," The New York Times wrote, "gives the court truly world jurisdiction of the first time."
- The government of Sweden announced that it would hold a referendum on August 27 on whether to prohibit the sale of alcohol, which was already under control of the government.
- Austria passed a law forbidding the sale of alcohol to minors.
- The resort town of Highland Beach, Maryland was incorporated as the first African American municipality in that state. One of the businessmen incorporating the town, the grandson of Frederick Douglass, Haley Douglass, became the first Highland Beach mayor and would serve for more than 30 years before his death on January 20, 1954.
- Born:
  - Murray Gershenz, American record store owner who became a TV actor at the age of 79; in New York City (d. 2013)
  - Bob Goldham, Canadian ice hockey goalkeeper and inductee into the Canada's Sports Hall of Fame; in Georgetown, Ontario, Canada (d. 1991)
  - David Noel Freedman, American archaeologist and Biblical scholar who was among the first to work on the Dead Sea Scrolls; as Noel Freedman, in New York City, United States (d. 2008)
- Died:
  - John Martin Poyer, 60-61, American naval commander in the U.S. Navy and Governor of American Samoa from 1915 to 1919 (b. 1861)
  - Eugenia Wheeler Goff, 78, American cartographer, historian and co-founder of the National Historical Publishing Company (b. 1844)

== May 13, 1922 (Saturday) ==
- The Council of the League of Nations voted to assume a protectorate over Albania after the government of the Balkan nation requested the League to take responsibility for its international affairs.
- The Kentucky Derby and the Preakness Stakes, now both events in the Triple Crown of thoroughbred horse racing in the United States, were run on the same day for the second and final time. Morvich won the Derby and Pillory won the Preakness.
- Romantic film leading man Rudolph Valentino and Winifred Hudnut, the art director in his film Camille, were married in Mexico in Mexicali. Although Valentino had gotten a divorce from his first wife, Jean Acker, Valentino was arrested for bigamy because California law at the time required parties to wait one year after a divorce decree before getting remarried.
- L'horizon chimérique, the last full concert work by French composer Gabriel Fauré, premiered in Paris at the Société nationale de musique, as a four-act song cycle sung by baritone Charles Panzéra, accompanied on the piano by his wife, Magdeleine Panzéra-Baillot. The event was preceded by the premiere of Fauré's Second Cello Sonata, based on the funeral march composed by Fauré to mark the centennial of the 1821 death of Napoleon.
- Polish composer Karol Szymanowski's opera Hagith premiered at the Teatr Wielki, the opera theater in Warsaw.
- Born:
  - Otl Aicher, German graphic designer known for his design of symbols used in airports and in sports; as Otto Aicher, in Ulm (d. 1991)
  - Bea Arthur, Emmy Award-winning American TV actress known for her roles in Maude and The Golden Girls; as Bernice Frankel, in New York City (d. 2009)
  - William Duff, Scottish banker and a chief financial advisor to Rashid bin Saeed Al Maktoum in the economic growth of the United Arab Emirates; as William MacDuff, in Singapore, British Straits Settlements (d. 2014)
  - Gladys Heldman, American tennis player and publisher who founded World Tennis magazine and campaigned for the promotion and advancement of women's professional tennis; as Gladys Medalie, in New York City, United States (d. 2003)

== May 14, 1922 (Sunday) ==
- Italian Fascist Party leader Benito Mussolini fought a sword duel with a rival newspaper editor over differences arising in their respective newspapers. Mussolini was declared the victor.
- Tusko, billed by the Al G. Barnes Circus as "the largest elephant ever in captivity" as well as "The Meanest Elephant", escaped from the circus an hour before its show was to begin in the town of Sedro-Woolley, Washington, and went on a rampage, knocking down telephone poles, wrecking automobiles, uprooting trees and knocking down fences. Damages were estimated at the time as $20,000 (equivalent to about $325,000 in 2021).
- FC Barcelona beat Real Unión 5–1 in the Copa del Rey Final.
- In the only season that Italy's soccer football system was split between two rival leagues, both the Federazione Italiana Giuoco Calcio (FIGC) and the rival Confederazione Calcistica Italiana (CCI) played championship games the same day. Pro Vercelli and Genoa C.F.C., who had played to a 0–0 draw in the first leg of the two-game aggregate score series, met for the second game and Pro Vercelli won the CCI title, 2 to 1. On the same day, U.S.D. Novese and Sampierdarenese, who had played a 0–0 draw on the first leg of their series, played another 0–0 draw. In the tiebreaker on May 21, Novese beat Sampdoria to win the CIGC title, 2 to 1.
- Born: Franjo Tuđman, Croatian politician and historian who served as the first President of Croatia from 1990 to 1999; in Veliko Trgovišće, Kingdom of Yugoslavia (present-day Croatia) (d. 1999)
- Died: Eugenie Blair, 57-58, American stage actress, died moments after completing her performance of the role of "Marthy Owen, the water woman" in the play Anna Christie, at the Cort Theatre in Chicago. (b. 1864)

== May 15, 1922 (Monday) ==
- The German–Polish Convention regarding Upper Silesia was signed in Geneva, providing for the division of the former Prussian province of Upper Silesia along ethnic lines in accordance with a 1921 plebiscite. On June 20, 1922, Germany would cede 41 percent of the Province of Upper Silesia to Poland. The rest of Silesia would be ceded to Poland after the end of World War II.
- The U.S. Supreme Court decided two cases that voided reform legislation as unconstitutional. In Bailey v. Drexel Furniture Co., the Court voided the Child Labor Tax Law of 1919 that had imposed a 10 percent tax on the profits of any company that employed children, commenting that the tax was actually a penalty intended to deter child employment. In Hill v. Wallace, the Court struck down the Future Trading Act of 1921, a tax on contracts for future delivery of grain.
- Born:
  - Jakucho Setouchi, Japanese Buddhist nun, writer and activist; as Harumi Mitani, in Tokushima, Empire of Japan (d. 2021)
  - Rauf Hajiyev, Soviet Azerbaijani composer and director of the Azerbaijan Philharmonic Orchestra; in Baku, Transcaucasian Socialist Federative Soviet Republic, Soviet Union (present-day Azerbaijan) (d. 1995)
- Died: Leslie Ward, 70, English portrait artist and caricaturist who used the pseudonym "Spy" in his popular illustrations for Britain's Vanity Fair magazine (b. 1851)

== May 16, 1922 (Tuesday) ==
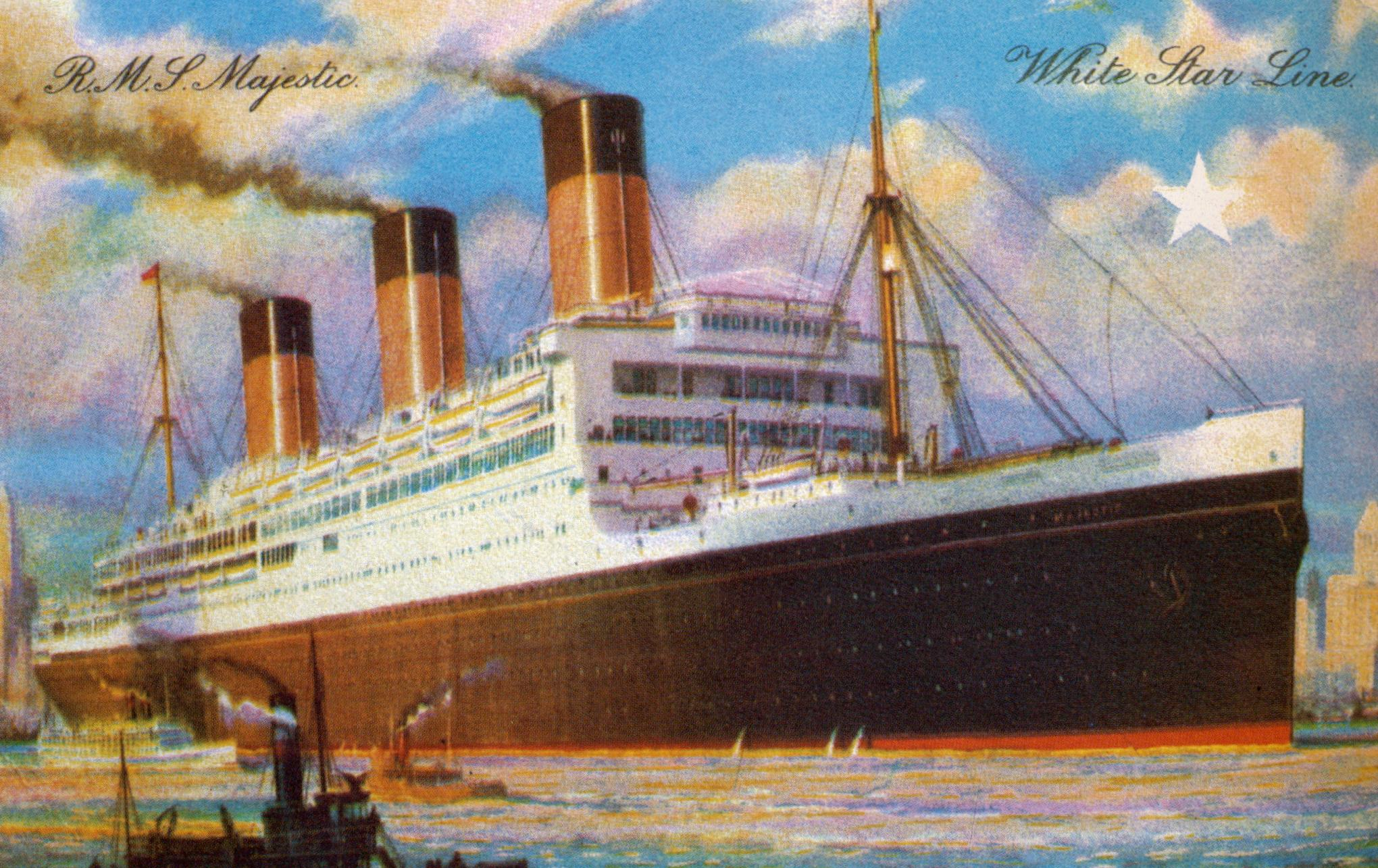
RMS Majestic

- The world's largest ship, the White Star liner RMS Majestic completed its maiden voyage, reaching New York Harbor from Southampton in 5 days 14 hours 45 minutes. The Majestic was actually launched in Germany as the Hamburg America liner SS Bismarck in 1914, but was left incomplete for years due to the outbreak of the war and then sold to White Star.
- A bridge collapse killed 19 people in Texas when the structure over the Brazos River, between the towns of Marlin and Belton gave way. About 30 had gathered on the bridge to watch raging floodwaters when the west end of the bridge separated from its moorings and threw them into the river.
- Nikolaos Stratos formed a new government as Prime Minister of Greece but he and the ministers resigned after only 48 hours when the National Assembly voted no confidence in his cabinet.
- Australian operatic soprano Florence Austral made her debut in the United Kingdom, appearing at Covent Garden as Brünnhilde in the production of Wagner's opera Die Walküre. Austral, born Florence Mary Wilson, adopted her stage name "Austral" in honor of her native land of Australia.
- Born:
  - Alexander Colin Cole, British heraldic authority and Garter Principal King of Arms from 1978 to 1992; in Surrey, England (d. 2001)
  - Speedy Haworth, American country music guitarist and singer; as Herschel Haworth Jr., in Springfield, Missouri (d. 2008)
- Died:
  - Wilhelm von Leube, 79, German internist and gastroenterological specialist (b. 1842)
  - Rudolf Montecuccoli, 79, Chief of the Austro-Hungarian Navy from 1904 to 1913 who oversaw the modernization of the imperial fleet (b. 1843)

== May 17, 1922 (Wednesday) ==
- The British Army formally handed over possession of its Portobello Barracks, in the Dublin suburb of Rathmines, to the Irish Free State Army in a ceremony at 3:00 in the afternoon, bringing a formal end to Britain's military presence in Southern Ireland. On behalf of the British, Major Clarke of the Worcestershire Regiment handed the document of transfer to Commandant-General Tom Ennis and said "This is your show now." The barracks now houses the Irish Military Archives for Ireland's Department of Defence.
- The British city of Manchester was introduced to radio as the Metropolitan-Vickers Company began broadcasting from station 2ZY. It would begin regular broadcasting on November 15, 1922, and is now BBC Radio Manchester.
- The periodic Comet Grigg–Skjellerup, initially observed by New Zealand astronomer John Grigg was "rediscovered" and confirmed as periodic by Frank Skjellerup, an Australian-born telegraph operator in South Africa who was also an amateur astronomer.
- Kenelm Lee Guinness established a new land speed record of 133.75 miles per hour (215.25 km/h) driving a 350 hp Sunbeam car at Brooklands.
- Died:
  - Dorothy Levitt, 40, British race car driver and aviator who became known as "The Fastest Girl on Earth" for the fastest speed driven by a woman in 1906 in reaching 86 miles per hour (138 km/h), was found dead at her home from what was deemed an accidental overdose of morphine. (b. 1882)
  - Manuel Granero, 20, Spanish bullfighter known for his success, was killed by the bull "Pocapena" in Madrid. (b. 1902) Ernest Hemingway would make reference to the incident in his 1932 book Death in the Afternoon, and Georges Bataille would make it a feature in his novel Story of the Eye.

== May 18, 1922 (Thursday) ==
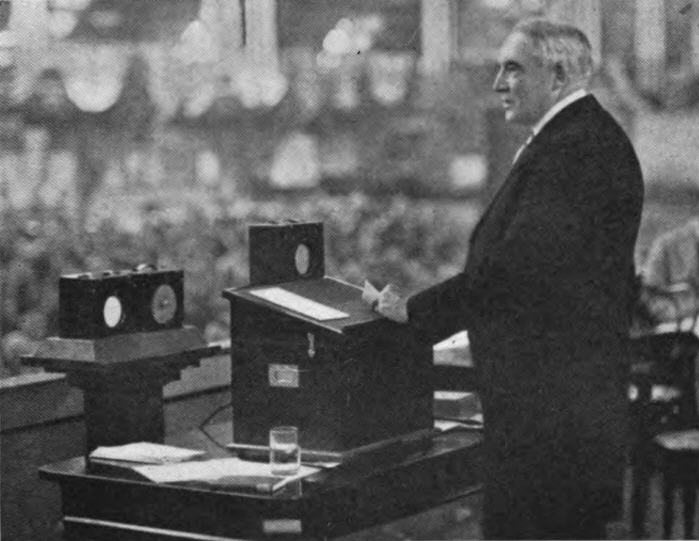
President Harding on the radio

- Warren G. Harding became the first U.S. president to be heard on the radio when the NOF radio station at NAS Anacostia near Washington, D.C., broadcast live coverage of Harding's speech to the U.S. Chamber of Commerce.
- In a dinner reception at the White House, 50 steel executives agreed to President Harding's request to reduce the 12-hour workday on humanitarian grounds.
- A fire in the nearly 12-century-old Ospedale di Santo Spirito in Sassia complex in Rome killed 20 patients, most of them chronically ill persons confined to their beds.
- Charles Atkins, a 15-year-old African American boy suspected of killing a white woman, was tortured and then burned to death by a lynch mob in Davisboro, Georgia.
- The musical stage comedy Whirled into Happiness, with music by Robert Stolz and lyrics by Harry Graham, premiered at the Lyric Theatre in London.
- Marcel Proust, Pablo Picasso, James Joyce, Igor Stravinsky and Sergei Diaghilev dine together at the Hotel Majestic in Paris, their only joint meeting.
- Born:
  - Gerda Boyesen, Norwegian psychologist and specialist in biodynamic psychology; in Bergen (d. 2005)
  - Bill Macy, American actor known for his role of Walter Findlay on the sitcom Maude; as Wolf Martin Garber, in Revere, Massachusetts (d. 2019)
  - Kai Winding, Danish jazz trombonist and composer; in Aarhus (d. 1983)
  - Wazir Agha, Pakistani author and poet; in Wazir Kot village near Sargodha, Punjab Province, British India (now in Pakistan) (d. 2010)
- Died: Charles Louis Alphonse Laveran, 76, French physician and Nobel Prize laureate (b. 1845)

== May 19, 1922 (Friday) ==
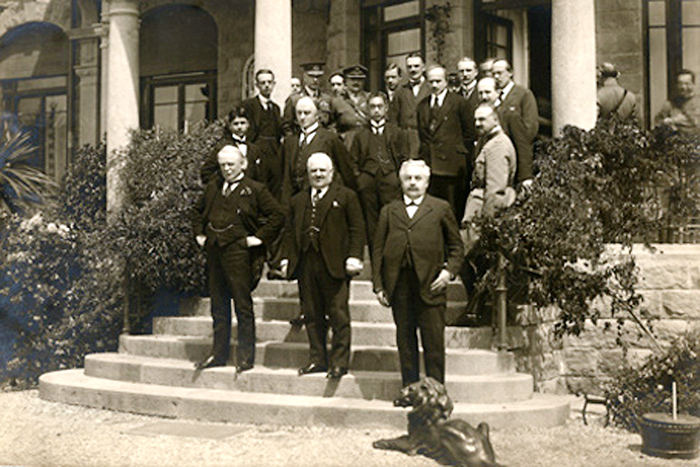
Representatives of nations at the Genoa Conference

- The Genoa Conference of 34 nations to discuss economic and political issues ended after six weeks, with a general agreement to resume tying currencies to the gold standard.
- The Committee on Privileges of Britain's House of Lords voted, 20 to 4, to reject the proposal to allow women to sit in the House, a decision that affected 20 women holding Peerages (hereditary titles), and was prompted after the committee had earlier ruled that Lady Rhondda could become a member of the Lords.

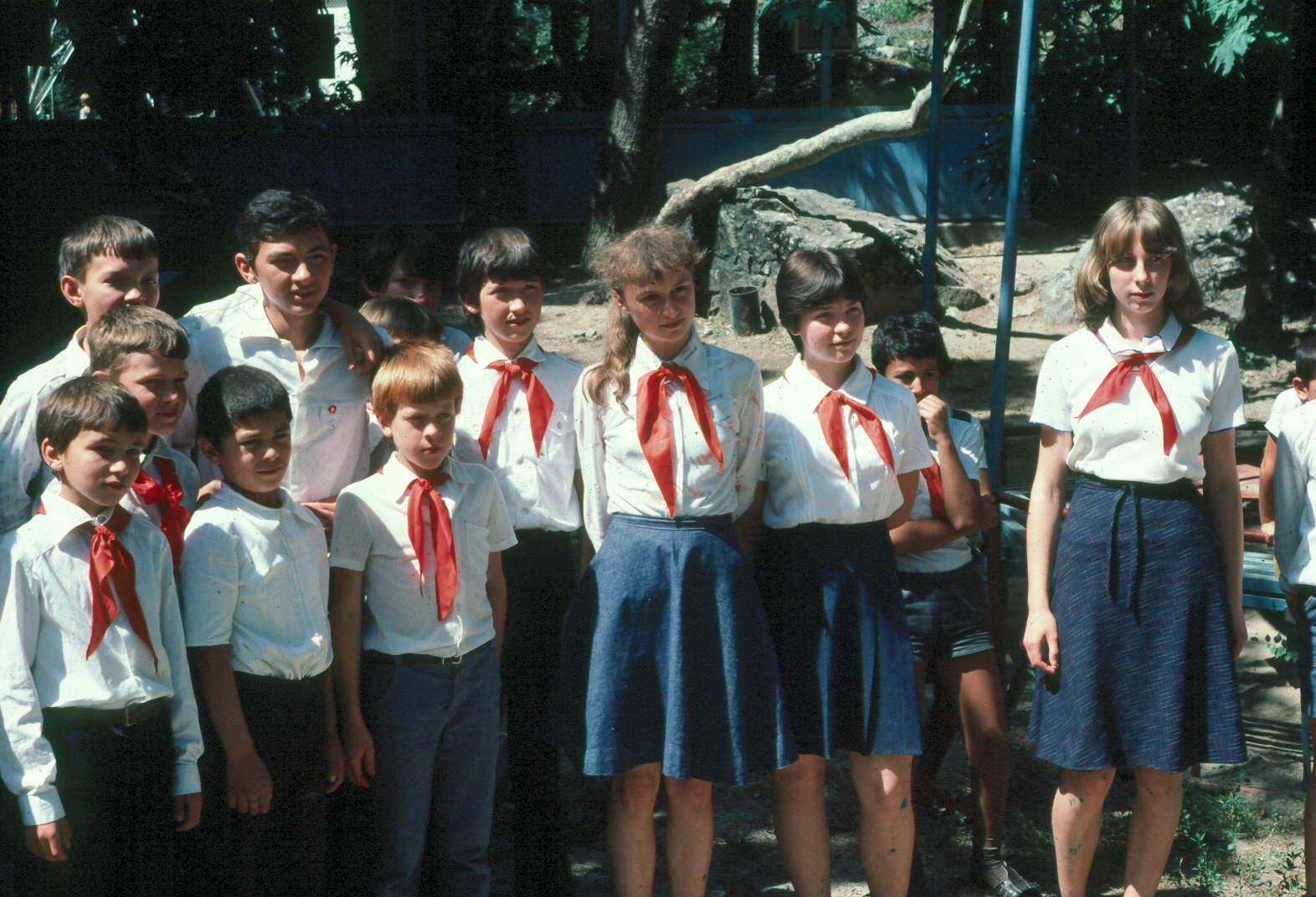
A group of Young Pioneers in 1983

- The "Young Pioneers" (Юных пионеров or Yunykh pionerov) scouting organization, initially called "Spartak," was launched by Soviet Russia's Communist Party to consolidate youth groups that had been formed to compete with the Russian Boy Scouts (Русский Скаут or Russkiy Skaut) organization that had been organized on April 30, 1909. Renamed the "Vladimir Lenin All-Union Pioneer Organization" in 1924 after Lenin's death, the Young Pioneers became the only legal scouting organization upon its founding, and the Soviets banned the Russian Scouts and other organizations that had declined to follow the Communist ideology.
- The WGN media company of Chicago began broadcasting, initially as the AM radio station WDAP, for the corporation Mid West Radio Central, Inc.; in 1924, it would be purchased by the Chicago Tribune and adopt new call letters to reflect the Tribune slogan ("World's Greatest Newspaper"). After starting a companion FM radio station in 1941 (WGNB) and in 1948 an independent television station, WGN-TV. In 1978, WGN-TV would become a nationwide channel for cable and satellite TV subscribers and in 2020 re-brand as NewsNation.
- Born:
  - Joe Gilmore, renowned Northern Irish bartender and inventor of numerous cocktails; as Joseph Gilmore, in Belfast, Northern Ireland (d. 2015)
  - Lilian Edirisinghe, Sri Lankan stage, film and TV actress; in Imbulgoda, Western Province, British Ceylon (present-day Sri Lanka) (d. 1993)
  - Nikolai Skomorokhov, Soviet Air Forces flying ace with 40 shootdowns in World War II; in Lapot village near Saratov, Russian SFSR, Soviet Union) (d. 1994)
  - Arthur Gorrie, Australian hobby shop proprietor; in Brisbane (d. 1992)
- Died: Son Byong-hi, 61, Korean nationalist and independence activist, died after an illness. (b. 1861)

== May 20, 1922 (Saturday) ==
- The sinking of the ocean liner SS Egypt killed 86 members of the crew and 16 passengers. The P & O (Peninsular and Oriental Line) ship went down only 20 minutes after its hull was pierced in a collision with the French steamship Seine 32 miles (51 km) west of the coast of France. Another 267 survivors were able to evacuate in lifeboats and were rescued. The accident happened at about 7:30 in the evening when many of the passengers were eating dinner. SS Egypt had been carrying a cargo of over one million pounds sterling (equivalent to £58 million or $80 million in 2021) and salvage attempts would begin immediately after the sunken vessel's rediscovery in 1930.
- Irish republican activists Michael Collins and Éamon de Valera announced in the Dáil that they had agreed on a pact for elections to take place in Ireland on June 16. Their agreement was approved by the members of parliament of the Sinn Féin political party to form a coalition government consisting of both proponents and opponents of the Anglo-Irish Treaty, after having been brokered between Michael Collins (pro-treaty) and Éamon de Valera (anti-treaty).
- Petros Protopapadakis became the new Prime Minister of Greece. Prime Minister Protopapadakis and his two immediate predecessors, Gounaris and Stratos, would all be executed on November 15, 1922 after the overthrow of the government in the wake of Greece's loss to Turkey at the end of a three-year war.
- Joe Winters, a 19-year-old African American man accused of assaulting a white girl, was burned in the courthouse square by a lynch mob in Conroe, Texas.
- Rudolph Valentino was arrested on a felony charge of bigamy after his return to the U.S. from his May 13 wedding to Winifred Hudnut. Although Valentino's first wife, Jean Acker, had gotten a judgment of divorce, California law required a one-year wait before either party could remarry. Appearing with his lawyer, Valentino surrendered to the District Attorney's office in Los Angeles, entered a not guilty plea and was released after posting a bond of $10,000 for bail.
- Baseball stars Babe Ruth and Bob Meusel were reinstated after having been suspended for the first six weeks of the season for barnstorming in violation of organized baseball's regulations. Ruth, playing his first game in the 1922 season after missing 33 games, failed to hit beyond the infield in four at bats in an 8 to 2 loss by the New York Yankees to the St. Louis Browns.
- WCAX in Burlington, Vermont went on the air, the first radio station in the state.
- Born:
  - Sir Clifford Butler, English physicist known for the discovery of the hyperon and meson types of subatomic particles in 1947; in Reading, Berkshire (d. 1999)
  - James Nightall, railroad fireman and posthumous recipient of the George Cross for his heroism in the 1944 Soham rail disaster (d. 1944)

== May 21, 1922 (Sunday) ==
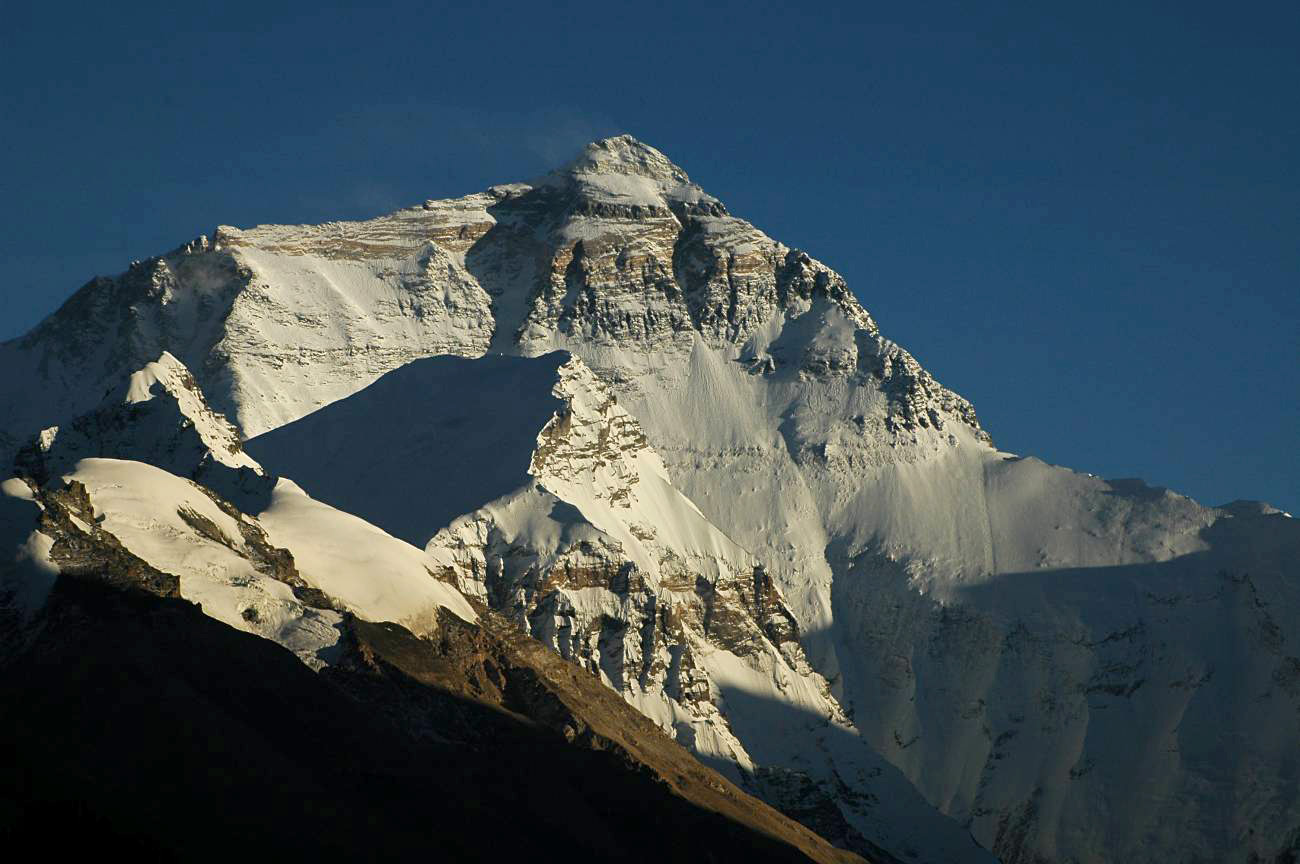
The route of Mallory, Norton and Somervell upper left side

- Three English mountaineers on the British expedition to Mount Everest came within 2,239 feet (682 m) of the summit of the 29,032.7 feet (8,849.2 m) high mountain, the tallest on Earth, after leaving a base camp established at 25,000 feet (7,600 m) the day before. George Mallory and Major Edward F. Norton, accompanied by the expedition's physician, Dr. Howard Somervell climbed to an altitude of 26,800 feet (8,200 m), the highest reached by a climber up to that time before beginning their descent downward. The new altitude surpassed the mark set by Prince Luigi Amedeo, Duke of the Abruzzi of 24,533 feet (7,478 m) on K2 in 1909.
- Presbyterian minister Harry Emerson Fosdick first delivered the sermon "Shall the Fundamentalists Win?", later reprinted and distributed, that would lead to the Fundamentalist–Modernist controversy, a schism in the Presbyterian Church in the United States of America between two schools of belief. Fosdick and the Modernists took a liberal approach to Biblical interpretation, advocating an adaptation of religion to respond to changing times, while the fundamentalists relied on a literal interpretation of scripture.
- The iron-clad wooden steam freighter Conestoga caught fire and sank in the Saint Lawrence River.
- The historical film Nero premiered at the Lyric Theatre in New York City.
- Born: James Lopez Watson, American federal judge who was the first African American to head a federal court in the Deep South; in Harlem, New York City (d. 2001)
- Died: Michael Mayr, 58, Chancellor of Austria from 1920 to 1921 (b. 1864)

== May 22, 1922 (Monday) ==
- William J. Twaddell, a member of parliament for Northern Ireland, was shot and killed by the Irish Republican Army while walking to work. Three men followed the M.P. as he walked along Garfield Street in Belfast toward his drapery business on North Street and, "When he was within fifty yards of his premises", the three assailants fired at him with their revolvers, then fled while firing at any pursuers. His death resulted in the arrest of 350 known IRA members during the investigation, but the only person put on trial would be acquitted of all charges.
- London recorded its hottest May temperature in 50 years with a mark of 32.8 degrees Celsius (91 degrees Fahrenheit).
- An attempt by rebels to overthrow the government of Nicaragua failed after an intervention by U.S. Marines occupying the Central American nation. The rebels, led by General Arcenio Cruz, seized La Loma, a fortress overlooking the capital of Managua but the commander of a detachment of Marines encamped at Campo de Marte approached Cruz and warned him that "the marine force would not hesitate to use its artillery for the protection of American interests, the American Legation and the city" Within eight hours, the rebels surrendered after the American Minister to Nicaragua worked out an agreement with the government to pardon any civilians who had participated in the rebellion and to limit punishment of members of the military to no more than 30 days imprisonment.
- Born:
  - Quinn Martin, American television producer known for numerous successful TV series, including The Fugitive and The Streets of San Francisco; as Irwin Martin Cohn, in New York City (d. 1987)
  - Looksmart Ngudle, black South African politician and civil rights activist, first political prisoner to die while incarcerated for anti-apartheid protests; in KwaZali village, near Alice, Eastern Cape province, Union of South Africa (d. 1963)
  - Harold L. Peterson, American weapons expert and military historian; Peekskill, New York (d. 1978)
  - Lorraine Fox, American book and magazine illustrator; in Brooklyn, New York City (d. 1976)
- Died: Ada Jones, 48, English-born American singer, one of the first recording artists in the world, died from kidney failure. (b. 1873)

== May 23, 1922 (Tuesday) ==
- Vladimir Lenin, leader of the Soviet Union's Communist Party and Premier of the USSR, suffered the first of three strokes, and was rendered paralyzed on his left side and unable to speak. A confirmation was made by the Soviet government on June 3, with a statement from Lenin's physicians that Lenin's illness was a minor disorder of the blood circulation which, however, within the next few days, began to improve. Lenin suffered a second stroke on June 1, prompting officials to return from a conference in Berlin to Moscow. He would remain inactive until October.
- On the day after the assassination of Northern Ireland M.P. William J. Twaddell, the government of Northern Ireland, led by Sir James Craig, issued a declaration outlawing the Irish Republican Army, the Irish Republican Brotherhood, the Irish Volunteers and the women's and youth's society Cumann na mBan and warned that persons joining any of the four organizations advocating independence from the United Kingdom of Great Britain and Ireland would be liable to be arrested and prosecuted. At the same time, Sinn Féin was outlawed in the six Irish counties that constituted Northern Ireland and the Ulster government began a roundup of Sinn Féin members, serving arrest warrants on 300 people between midnight and dawn and imprisoning them.
- Abie's Irish Rose, the most popular Broadway theatre play of the 1920s, was premiered at the Fulton Theatre in New York City with the first of 2,327 performances. Closing on October 21, 1927, Abie's Irish Rose would hold the record for the longest-running Broadway show until surpassed by Tobacco Road.
- Harry Greb won the American light heavyweight boxing championship from the previously undefeated Gene Tunney in what was literally one of the bloodiest bouts in boxing history. Despite bleeding profusely from a gash over his left eye, and having his nose broken, Tunney continued to fight for the full 15 rounds, and refused to quit. Referee Kid McPartland refused to stop the fight without Tunney's approval and the ring at Madison Square Garden was spattered as Tunney lost an estimated two quarts of blood.
- George Finch and Geoffrey Bruce, the lead mountaineers on the 1922 British Mount Everest expedition, became the first persons to climb to an altitude of more than 27,000 feet and more than 8,000 meters, reaching 27,300 feet (8,300 m) on the north ridge of Mount Everest, and coming within less than 2,000 feet or 550 meters of the summit of the world's tallest (29,031.7 feet (8,848.9 m)) mountain.
- WDAY of Fargo, North Dakota, the first licensed radio station in the state, went on the air.
- Born: Katharina Mangold-Wirz, Swiss marine biologist; as Katharina Wirz, in Basel (d. 2003)
- Died: Leona Dare, 67-68, American trapeze artist and acrobat who was popular during the 1870s and 1880s for her daring feats, including performing on a trapeze while at high altitude after ascending by balloon (b. 1854 or 1855)

== May 24, 1922 (Wednesday) ==
- The first use of binding arbitration in the United States, as a substitute for a civil trial in court, took place at a conference room of the New York City Lawyers' Club at 115 Broadway as the state of New York's Arbitration Act went into effect. The very first case was a dispute between business partners Benjamin H. Lee and Jesse M. Barrymore over the amount of $130, which The New York Times described as "so small that it would be eaten up in court costs and lawyers' fees no matter how quickly it was decided." The first arbitrator, agreed upon by the parties, was a private attorney, Alexander Rose, and was notable for requiring no lawyers to represent the parties and costing only $10 for a 75-minute hearing.
- Italy and Soviet Russia signed a two-year commercial treaty in Rome. Russia later refused to ratify it.
- Pope Pius XI opened the 26th International Eucharistic Congress in Rome with 30,000 people taking part in the opening ceremony.
- Ten German Navy sailors aboard the torpedo boat T-18 were killed when the boat collided with the battleship Hannover.
- The unlucky Green Star Steamship freighter SS Eurana arrived back in New York City after departing in September 1920 to Baltimore and then toward Singapore, stopping for major problems with turbines and boilers at Honolulu for three months, then Singapore, Shanghai, Hong Kong, Indonesia and Sri Lanka (where feed pumps and condenser tubes slowed the ship) then to Aden for more repairs before going through the Suez Canal to the Mediterranean and finally to the Atlantic and a return to New York.
- Died: John B. Rae, 83, American labor leader who served as the first President of the United Mine Workers of America from 1890 to 1892 (b. 1838)

== May 25, 1922 (Thursday) ==
- A general strike was called in Rome in protest against the disorders in San Lorenzo. Thousands of pilgrims attending the Eucharistic Congress had to walk to St. Peter's Basilica to hear the Mass because all public transportation was shut down.
- Babe Ruth was ejected for the first time from a baseball game as a member of the New York Yankees. Only six days after returning from a five-week suspension, Ruth was playing against the Washington Senators (which the Yankees won, 6 to 4) at the Polo Grounds. He had thrown dirt in the face of umpire George Hildebrand after being called out at second base while trying to stretch a single into a double. Ejected from the game, Ruth was heckled by a fan on the way to the dugout, and "in a flash he vaulted to the roof of the dugout, clambered through a box filled with people and started up the aisle in the direction of his tormentor" who "put several rows between him and the Babe and from this point of safety listened to a series of scathing remarks from the irate player." After Ruth left, the Pullman conductor who shouted the remarks and refused to give his name, left the park after being asked by the Yankees' management to go. Ruth was fined $200 and suspended for one game.
- Born: Enrico Berlinguer, Italian politician who served as the leader of the Italian Communist Party from 1972 until his death; in Sassari, Kingdom of Italy (d. 1984)
- Died: Roy Redgrave, 49, English stage actor and film actor considered to be the first member of the Redgrave acting dynasty (b. 1873)

== May 26, 1922 (Friday) ==
- The Narcotic Drugs Import and Export Act, commonly called the Jones-Miller Act, was signed into law by U.S. President Warren G. Harding as the first federal law regulating the sale and transportation of opiates and other addictive drugs, and created the Federal Bureau of Narcotics, predecessor to the Drug Enforcement Administration.
- Born:
  - Troy Smith, American businessman and founder of Sonic Drive-In restaurant chain; in Oilton, Oklahoma (d. 2009)
  - Lorraine Monk, Canadian photographer and executive producer with the National Film Board of Canada; as Lorraine Spurrell, in Montreal (d. 2020)
- Died: Ernest Solvay, 84, Belgian chemist and inventor who developed the ammonia-soda process for the manufacture of sodium carbonate (b. 1838)

== May 27, 1922 (Saturday) ==
- A civil war broke out in Paraguay after President Eusebio Ayala canceled plans for a presidential election. Eduardo Schaerer, a candidate for president against Manuel Gondra, approved an attack by Adolfo Chirife and announced his intentions from the town of Paraguari with 1,700 troops to take control of the capital at Asunción. The war would continue for almost 14 months, ending after Chirife died of pneumonia. Although Chirife's successor Pedro Mendoza and his remaining forces reached the capital on July 9 without resistance, forces loyal to Gondra counter-attacked the next day and Schaerer's supporters surrendered.
- A parade of 25,000 Ukrainian Americans took place in New York City to protest the Polish military occupation of East Galicia. The group then held a mass meeting in Madison Square Garden. Although Poland claimed Galicia in the Peace of Riga, not all Ukrainians accepted the occupation as legitimate.
- The Parliament of Southern Ireland, created by the British government to allow some autonomy in Dublin, was dissolved by the Viscount FitzAlan, the British Lord Lieutenant of Ireland, who proclaimed its end and its replacement by a new "Provisional Parliament", with elections to be held on June 16.
- F. Scott Fitzgerald's short story "The Curious Case of Benjamin Button" was published for the first time, initially as a feature in Collier's magazine. It would be adapted in 2008 to a film of the same name.
- Born:
  - Christopher Lee, English film actor; in Belgravia, London (d. 2015)
  - Otto Carius, German tank commander in the Wehrmacht during World War II; in Zweibrücken (d. 2015)

== May 28, 1922 (Sunday) ==
- Elections were held in Luxembourg for 25 of the 48 seats in the Chamber of Deputies. The Party of the Right, led by Prime Minister Émile Reuter, lost one seat but retained its 26-seat majority.
- Elections began in Hungary for 140 of the 244 seats in the new National Assembly. The other 104 districts held voting on June 1.
- Born:
  - Lou Duva, boxing trainer and manager of 19 different world champions, including Evander Holyfield, Lennox Lewis, and Héctor Camacho; in New York City (d. 2017)
  - Vinod, Indian composer and film score director; as Eric Roberts, in Lahore, Punjab Province, British India (now in Pakistan) (d. 1959)
  - Tuomas Gerdt, Finnish soldier and Knight of the Mannerheim Cross; as Kaiho Tuomas Albin Gerdt, in Heinävesi (d. 2020)
  - Matsumi "Mike" Kanemitsu, Japanese American abstract painter; in Ogden, Utah (d. 1992)
  - David W. Preus, American Lutheran minister and the last president of the American Lutheran Church from 1973 until overseeing its 1988 merger with the Lutheran Church in America and the Association of Evangelical Lutheran Churches to form the Evangelical Lutheran Church in America; in Madison, Wisconsin (d. 2021)
- Died:
  - Julie Siegfried, 74, French women's rights leader and president of the Conseil National des femmes françaises (CNFF) (b. 1848)
  - John Munro Longyear, 72, American mining and timber company owner who developed coalfields in the Arctic Circle (b. 1850)
  - Isaac Whiting, 79, American leader of the Latter Day Saint movement who had served as the third president of the Church of Jesus Christ (Cutlerite) since 1902 (b. 1842)

== May 29, 1922 (Monday) ==
- The U.S. Supreme Court ruled unanimously that American antitrust laws did not apply to Major League Baseball, the designation for the National League and the American League that had agreed not compete to against each other for players, and effectively had a monopoly on organized baseball at the major league and minor league level. The decision in Federal Baseball Club v. National League, written by Oliver Wendell Holmes, determined that the travel of teams from one state to another to play baseball was not interstate commerce that could be regulated by the national government under the U.S. Constitution's Commerce Clause (Article I, Section 8) applying to "Commerce... among the several States" and that "exhibitions of baseball, which are purely state affairs."
- American Christian evangelist and faith healer Aimee Semple McPherson surprised a crowd at a revival in Wichita, Kansas by seeming to make the rain stop falling, interrupting a speaker and then praying for the rain to wait until "after the message has been delivered to these hungry souls." The Wichita Eagle reported the event the next day with the headline "Evangelist's Prayers Hold Big Rain Back".
- British Liberal MP Horatio Bottomley was sentenced to seven years in prison for fraud by pocketing the money paid to his "Victory Bond" fund during the Great War. Bottomley had promoted the bonds in his capacity as editor of the magazine John Bull.
- The objection by Pope Pius XI to the proposed British Mandate over Palestine was received by the League of Nations. The objection was made on religious grounds, based on the Roman Catholic Church's position that creation of a Jewish homeland in the Holy Land in Palestine gave unequal privileges to Zionists.
- Born:
  - Eleanor Coerr, Canadian-born American children's author; as Eleanor Page, in Kamsack, Saskatchewan (d. 2010)
  - Iannis Xenakis, Romanian-born Greek composer; in Brăila, Kingdom of Romania (d. 2001)
- Died: Yevgeny Vakhtangov, 39, Russian theater director and actor, died from cancer (b. 1883)

== May 30, 1922 (Tuesday) ==
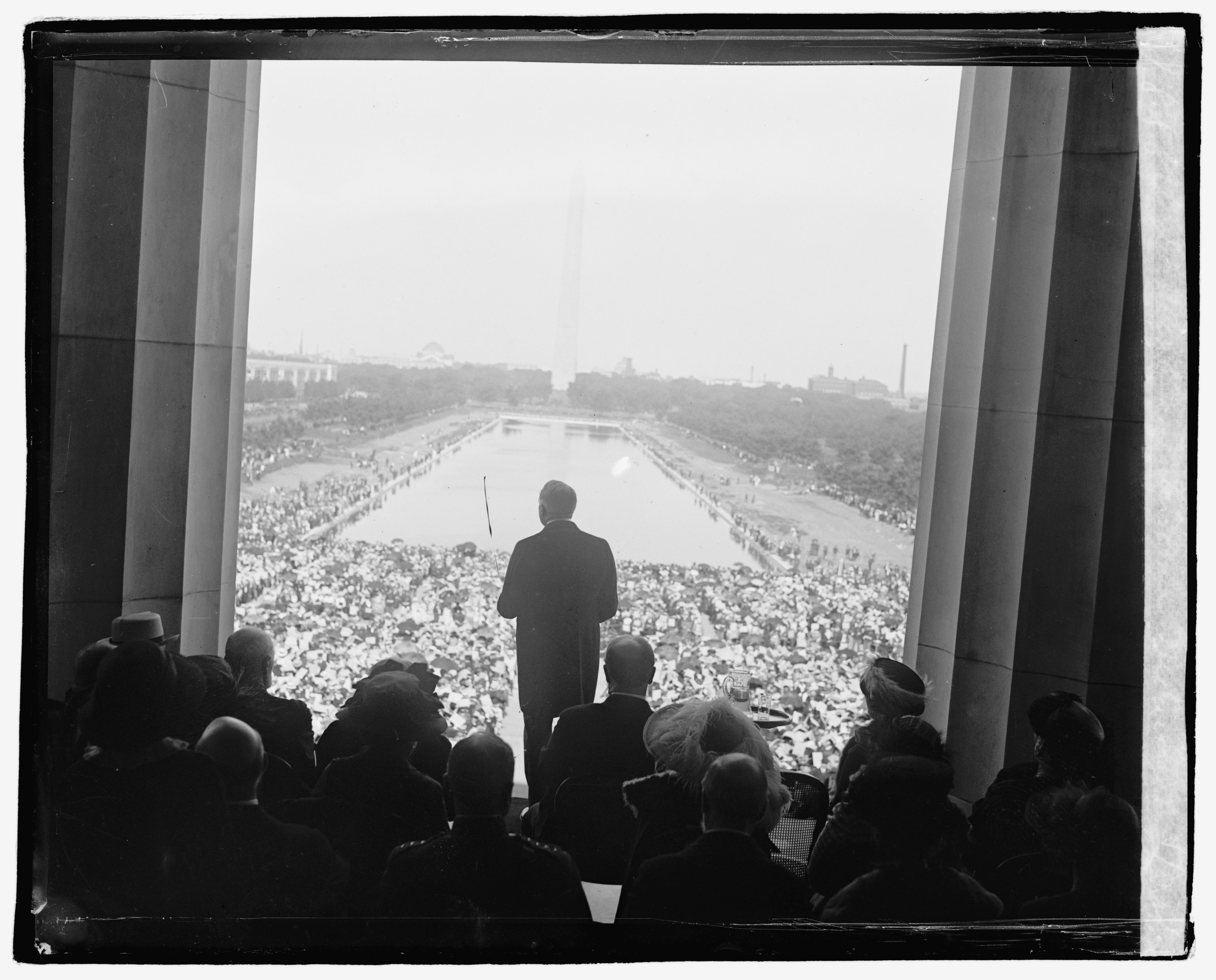
President Harding addressing the crowd

- The Lincoln Memorial was dedicated in Washington, D.C., on Memorial Day, with U.S. President Warren G. Harding praising President Abraham Lincoln. Construction of the building, designed by architect Henry Bacon, had started in 1912 and then was halted by World War I before resuming. "For ten years this white marble shrine with its massive Doric columns," The New York Times noted, "has been slowly rising on the banks of the Potomac at the western end of the Mall, where once there was a dismal, marshy waste." Robert Todd Lincoln, the late President's 78-year-old son and only surviving descendant, appeared as a special guest at the dedication. As part of the ceremony, the Memorial's centerpiece, sculptor Daniel Chester French's large marble statue of President Lincoln was unveiled to the public. Carved by the Piccirilli Brothers per French's design, the statue of Lincoln in an armchair is 19 feet (5.8 m) in height and sits on an 11 feet (3.4 m) high pedestal for a total height of 30 feet (9.1 m).
- Germany mourned the loss of its territory in Upper Silesia by lowering flags outside the Reichstag Building to half mast, and most of the members of parliament wore black as they met to vote in favor of ratifying the German treaty with Poland. "It was the blackest day in the Reichstag's history today," Cyril Brown wrote in The New York Times, adding "This is a historic day, for Germany's eastward revanche dream dates from it officially."
- The Latvian government and the Vatican signed a concordat in which the Latvian government agreed to allow freedom for the Roman Catholic Church in Latvia, in return for instructions from the Vatican to all Catholic bishops. The treaty was signed in Rome by Latvian Foreign Minister Zigfrids A. Meierovics and the Vatican's treasurer, Cardinal Pietro Gasparri.
- Jimmy Murphy won the Indianapolis 500. Murphy set a new record for the race, averaging 94.484 miles per hour (152.057 km/h) in driving 500 miles in 5 hours, 17 minutes and 30.79 seconds and breaking the 1915 record set by Ralph DePalma by more than 16 minutes.
- Born:
  - Hal Clement, American science fiction writer known for Mission of Gravity and other books in the Mesklin series; as Harry Clement Stubbs, in Somerville, Massachusetts (d. 2003)
  - Rose Evansky, German-born British hairdresser who introduced the "blow dry" look to women's styling in 1962, with the use of a hand-held hair dryer and hairbrush; as Rose Lerner, in Worms (d. 2016)

== May 31, 1922 (Wednesday) ==
- Skywriting, the use of an airplane and visible exhaust to fly in order to "write" words and individual letters, was first used in advertising. Flying above Epsom Downs Racecourse in England, RAF Captain Cyril Turner wrote "Daily Mail" to promote the popular London newspaper in advance of the running of the Epsom Derby.
- In an address before the Greek National Assembly, Foreign Minister Georgios Baltatzis said that more than 300,000 civilians had been massacred by the Turks in the districts of Amasia (Amasya), Neo-Caesaria (Niksar or Tokat), Trebizond (Trabzon), Chaldia, Rodopolis (now Vartsikhe) in Georgia and Kolenia, and gave the count as 303,238 people in the parts of Turkey that he was aware of.
- The Allied Reparations Commission informed Chancellor Joseph Wirth of Germany that it was willing to suspend reparations payments for the rest of 1922.
- Ignaz Seipel became Chancellor of Austria, succeeding Johannes Schober.
- All of the works of French author Anatole France were placed on the Index Librorum Prohibitorum, the Vatican's list of prohibited books. They would remain there until the abolition of the index in 1966.
- The Swedish Riksdag voted 105 to 94 against the ratification of the March 1 trade agreement with Russia.
- Captain Cuttle won England's premier horse race, the Epsom Derby.
- Born: Denholm Elliott, English actor; in Ealing, Middlesex (d. 1992)
- Died:
  - Herbert Rowse Armstrong, 53, English lawyer and convicted murderer, the only British solicitor ever hanged for murder, was executed at Gloucester Prison after being convicted of murdering his wife. (b. 1869)
  - Joseph McGuinness, 47, Irish politician and incumbent member of the Dáil Éireann(b. 1874)
