= Hartford, South Dakota =

- City
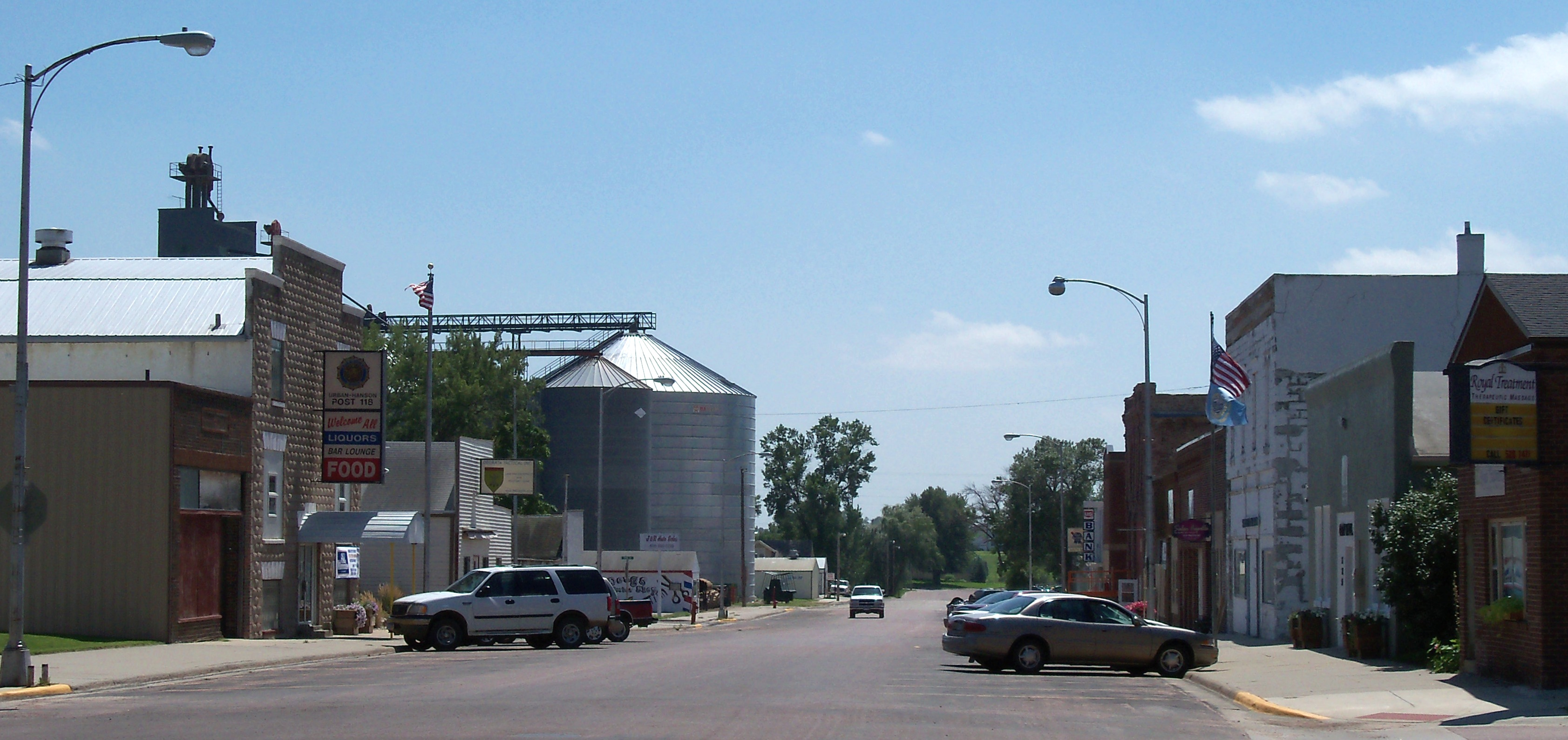
- Main Street in Hartford, August 2010

- Logo
- Motto: "Live Lively!"
- Location in Minnehaha County and the state of South Dakota
- Coordinates: 43°37′33″N 96°56′22″W
- Country: United States
- State: South Dakota
- County: Minnehaha
- Settled: 1878

Area
  - Total: 3.05 sq mi (7.91 km^{2})
  - Land: 3.05 sq mi (7.90 km^{2})
  - Water: 0 sq mi (0.00 km^{2})
- Elevation: 1,552 ft (473 m)

Population (2020)
  - Total: 3,354
  - Density: 1,099.4/sq mi (424.49/km^{2})
- Time zone: UTC−6 (Central (CST))
  - Summer (DST): UTC−5 (CDT)
- ZIP code: 57033
- Area code: 605
- FIPS code: 46-27540
- GNIS feature ID: 1267413
- Website: City of Hartford

Hartford is a suburban American city in Minnehaha County, South Dakota, a few miles northwest of Sioux Falls. Hartford is home to West Central High School with 408 students from the consolidated school district of Hartford, Humboldt, the Wall Lake area, and Ellis. Its population was 3,354 at the 2020 census.

== History ==
Originally named Oaksville in 1878 after I. E. Oaks, the town was renamed Hartford by early settlers in 1881 after Hartford, Connecticut. A post office has been in operation since 1880. The city incorporated in 1896.

== Geography ==
According to the United States Census Bureau, its area is 2.27 square miles (5.88 km^{2}), all land.

== Demographics ==
Historical population
Census	Pop.	Note	%±
1900	423		—
1910	648		53.2%
1920	677		4.5%
1930	628		−7.2%
1940	647		3.0%
1950	592		−8.5%
1960	688		16.2%
1970	800		16.3%
1980	1,207		50.9%
1990	1,262		4.6%
2000	1,844		46.1%
2010	2,534		37.4%
2020	3,354		32.4%
U.S. Decennial Census

=== 2020 census ===
As of the 2020 census, Hartford had a population of 3,354. The median age was 33.4 years, with 31.3% of residents under the age of 18 and 10.7% of residents 65 years of age or older. For every 100 females there were 100.7 males, and for every 100 females age 18 and over there were 95.7 males age 18 and over.

0.0% of residents lived in urban areas, while 100.0% lived in rural areas.

There were 1,218 households in Hartford, of which 42.2% had children under the age of 18 living in them. Of all households, 59.3% were married-couple households, 13.5% were households with a male householder and no spouse or partner present, and 20.3% were households with a female householder and no spouse or partner present. About 19.5% of all households were made up of individuals and 7.8% had someone living alone who was 65 years of age or older.

There were 1,294 housing units, of which 5.9% were vacant. The homeowner vacancy rate was 2.2% and the rental vacancy rate was 11.0%.

Racial composition as of the 2020 census
Race	Number	Percent
White	3,177	94.7%
Black or African American	20	0.6%
American Indian and Alaska Native	23	0.7%
Asian	3	0.1%
Native Hawaiian and Other Pacific Islander	0	0.0%
Some other race	10	0.3%
Two or more races	121	3.6%
Hispanic or Latino (of any race)	47	1.4%

=== 2010 census ===
At the 2010 census there were 2,534 people, 913 households, and 684 families living in the city. The population density was 1,116.3 inhabitants per square mile (431.0/km^{2}). There were 939 housing units at an average density of 413.7 units per square mile (159.7 units/km^{2}). The racial makeup of the city was 96.5% White, 0.6% African American, 1.2% Native American, 0.2% Asian, 0.1% from other races, and 1.4% from two or more races. Hispanic or Latino of any race were 0.6%.

Of the 913 households 45.3% had children under the age of 18 living with them, 62.2% were married couples living together, 9.4% had a female householder with no husband present, 3.3% had a male householder with no wife present, and 25.1% were non-families. 20.0% of households were one person and 7.8% were one person aged 65 or older. The average household size was 2.78 and the average family size was 3.23.

The median age was 31.9 years. 32.7% of residents were under the age of 18; 6.2% were between the ages of 18 and 24; 30.3% were from 25 to 44; 22.7% were from 45 to 64; and 8.3% were 65 or older. The gender makeup of the city was 48.2% male and 51.8% female.

=== 2000 census ===
At the 2000 census, there were 1,844 people, 661 households, and 534 families living in the city. The population density was 1,236.6 inhabitants per square mile (477.5/km^{2}). There were 675 housing units at an average density of 452.7 units per square mile (174.8 units/km^{2}). The racial makeup of the city was 97.56% White, 0.11% African American, 1.14% Native American, 0.05% Asian, 0.22% from other races, and 0.92% from two or more races. Hispanic or Latino of any race were 0.33% of the population.

Of the 661 households 48.6% had children under the age of 18 living with them, 66.0% were married couples living together, 12.4% had a female householder with no husband present, and 19.1% were non-families. 15.9% of households were one person and 6.1% were one person aged 65 or older. The average household size was 2.77 and the average family size was 3.09.

The age distribution was 32.0% under the age of 18, 6.5% from 18 to 24, 34.7% from 25 to 44, 18.4% from 45 to 64, and 8.5% 65 or older. The median age was 32 years. For every 100 females, there were 95.3 males. For every 100 females age 18 and over, there were 92.3 males.

The median household income was $48,333, and the median family income was $53,942. Males had a median income of $34,792 versus $25,032 for females. The per capita income for the city was $20,726. About 2.8% of families and 3.8% of the population were below the poverty line, including 5.6% of those under age 18 and 7.5% of those age 65 or over.

== Activities ==
=== Recreation and Nature Trails ===
Hartford has recreational and nature trails in the southwestern part of the city. The nature path showcases one-half mile of apple trees.

=== Park Shelters and Amphitheater ===
Hartford City Park has five shelters and an Amphitheater. Turtle Creek Park has one shelter. The shelters can be rented out through city hall.

== Notable people ==
- Ruth Brinker, activist and founder of the nonprofit, Project Open Hand.
- Michael John Fitzmaurice, United States Army recipient of the Medal of Honor for his actions in the Vietnam War
- Steve Kueter, former head football coach at O'Gorman Catholic High School
- Rhonda Milstead, member of the South Dakota House of Representatives

== See also ==
- List of cities in South Dakota
