= June 1922 =

Month of 1922

<<	June 1922					>>
Su	Mo	Tu	We	Th	Fr	Sa
				1	2	3
4	5	6	7	8	9	10
11	12	13	14	15	16	17
18	19	20	21	22	23	24
25	26	27	28	29	30

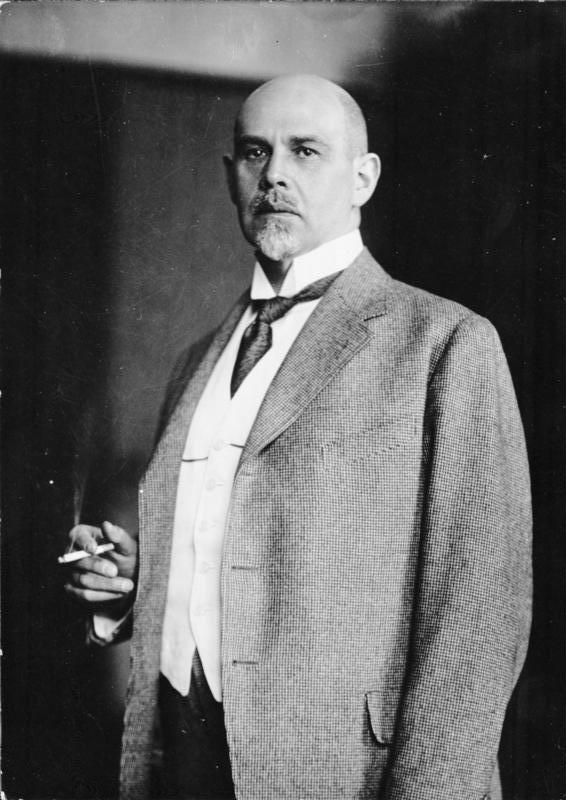
June 24, 1922: German Foreign Minister Walther Rathenau assassinated by terrorists

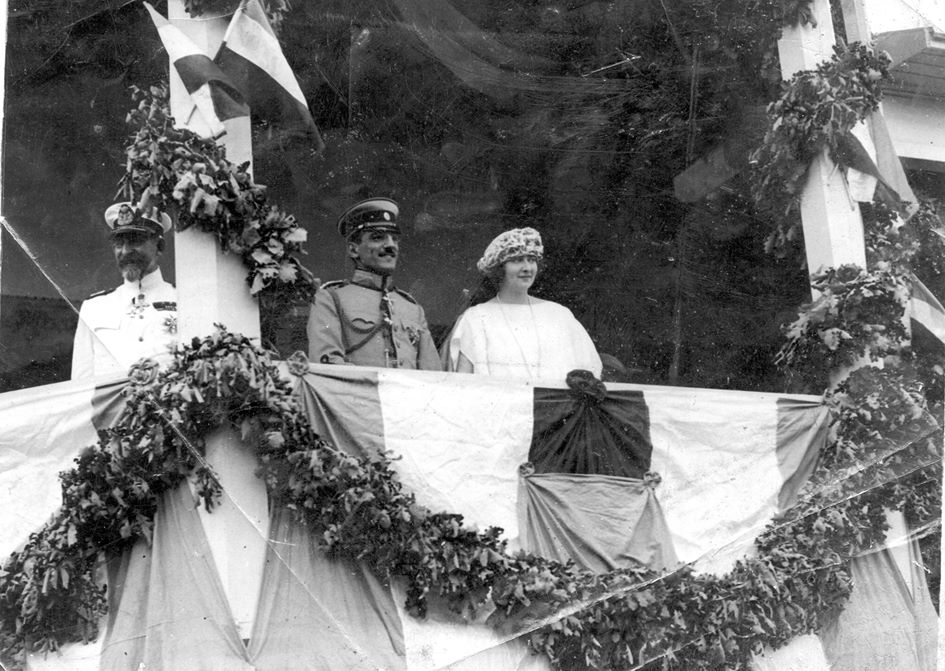
June 8, 1922: King Alexander and Queen Maria marry in Yugoslavia's first and last royal wedding

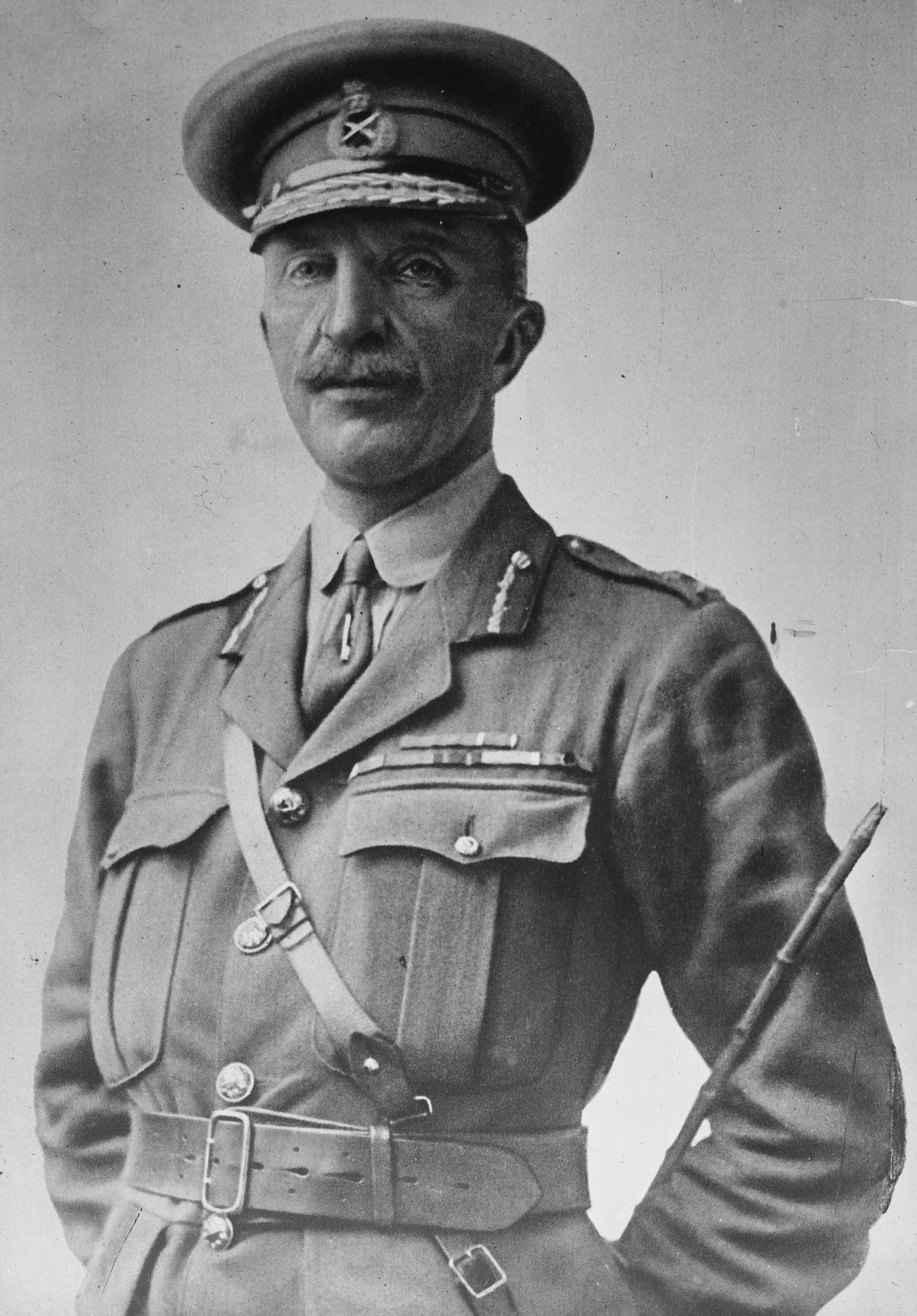
June 22, 1922: Sir Henry Wilson, British Army Field Marshal, assassinated by terrorists

The following events occurred in June 1922:

== June 1, 1922 (Thursday) ==
- The Royal Ulster Constabulary was formed as the police force of Northern Ireland and successor to the Royal Irish Constabulary.
- Rudolph Valentino appeared in Los Angeles court for a preliminary hearing on the bigamy charge against him. The courtroom was packed with spectators, mostly women, eager to see the screen idol.
- Born:
  - Povel Ramel, Swedish entertainer; in Östermalm (d. 2007)
  - Joan Caulfield, American actress and model; as Beatrice Joan Caulfield, in West Orange, New Jersey (d. 1991)
  - Lala Abdul Rashid, Pakistani field hockey player, goalkeeper for the Pakistan men's field hockey team at the 1960 Summer Olympics; in Rawalpindi, Punjab Province, British India (present-day Pakistan) (d. 1988)

== June 2, 1922 (Friday) ==
- China's acting prime minister, Zhou Ziqi (referred to in the press at the time as Chow Tsu-chi) became the acting President of the Republic of China as Xu Shichang (Hsu Shih-chang) stepped aside.
- Sir Arthur Conan Doyle, best known as the author of the Sherlock Holmes detective stories, premiered his film The Lost World, with the first showing at a dinner before the Society of American Magicians at New York City's Hotel McAlpin, and challenged the assembled illusionists to figure out how he had commissioned the unprecedented special effects.
- Aimo Cajander became Prime Minister of Finland.
- Voting concluded in elections in Hungary for the 245-member Hungarian National Assembly, with István Bethlen's Unity Party winning a majority with 140 seats. Voting began on May 28.
- Japan ratified the Shandong Treaty which improved relations with China and agreed to withdraw its troops from the Shandong Province, in return for China providing for protection of foreign construction workers building the Jinghu railway between Shanghai and Beijing.
- Born:
  - Charlie Sifford, American professional golfer, first African American player allowed on the PGA Tour in 1959; in Charlotte, North Carolina (d. 2015)
  - Stanislav Chekan, Soviet Russian character actor; in Rostov-on-Don, Russian SFSR, Soviet Union) (d. 1994)
- Died:
  - John Moses Cheney, 63, American federal judge and supporter of civil rights for African Americans (b. 1859)
  - Mary Virginia Terhune, 91, bestselling American novelist (b. 1830)

== June 3, 1922 (Saturday) ==
- Norwegian explorer Roald Amundsen set out from Seattle toward Nome, Alaska on the schooner Maud, on an expedition to the North Pole.
- The Igor Stravinsky opera buffa Mavra premiered at the Paris Opera.
- YPF S.A., an Argentine corporation for oil and gas exploration, production and distribution, was incorporated in Buenos Aires. The company, Yacimientos Petrolíferos Fiscales (Spanish for Petroleum Deposit Production) was the world's first oil company owned entirely by the government.

== June 4, 1922 (Sunday) ==
- Eighty people were killed when the Argentine steamer Villa Franca exploded and sank off of the coast of Paraguay, near Hohenau. The ship was transporting tourists from Argentina to Iguazu Falls when the blast took place at 1:40 in the morning, and "the vessel sank so quickly that the passengers had no time to dress or to get lifebelts."
- Born:
  - Samuel L. Gravely Jr., American Naval officer, first high-ranking African American officer in the United States Navy; in Richmond, Virginia (d. 2004)
  - Joe Vancisin, American basketball coach and inductee in the College Basketball Hall of Fame; in Bridgeport, Connecticut (d. 2021)
- Died: W. H. R. Rivers, 58, English neurologist and psychiatrist known for the treatment of World War I officers with shell shock, died from a strangulated hernia. (b. 1864)

== June 5, 1922 (Monday) ==
- The U.S. Supreme Court decided the case of Wyoming v. Colorado, a dispute between the two U.S. states over Colorado's upstream diversion of waters from the Laramie River that served the water needs of Wyoming. The Court ruled that Colorado's use of the Laramie River was limited, but not entirely precluded, by the needs of people downstream.
- Gago Coutinho and Sacadura Cabral, aviators of the Portuguese Navy, completed the first aerial crossing of the South Atlantic Ocean, arriving in Pernambuco in Brazil 67 days after their departure from Lisbon in Portugal, losing their first two airplanes along the way. They arrived in Rio de Janeiro on June 17.
- Former German Foreign Minister Philipp Scheidemann, leader of Germany's Socialist Party, escaped an attack by young assassin while vacationing at the Wilhelmshohe resort near Kassel. The attacker jumped on at Scheidemann's and threw hydrogen cyanide (commonly called prussic acid) at him. Scheidemann fired two shots at his assailant before being rendered unconscious, but recovered without injury.
- The U.S. state of Rhode Island licensed its first radio station, WEAN in Providence.

== June 6, 1922 (Tuesday) ==
- Elections were held for the Philippine House of Representatives and the Philippine Senate as part of the limited self-government for the U.S. territory. The Nacionalista Party, which was split into two factions, the Colectivistas headed by Manuel Quezon and the Unipersonalistas of Sergio Osmeña, had 64 of the seats in the 93-seat House and 17 in the 24-seat Senate.
- The collapse of two old buildings, both three stories tall, in Lviv buried 40 people inside at the time. According to the dispatch in the Associated Press, the buildings were "believed to have been shaken down by vibrations caused from a passing motor truck."
- The Soviet censorship agency Glavlit (Glavnoye upravpezhny po delam literaturi i izdatelst) or Main Administration for Literary and Publishing Affairs, was founded by decree of the Council of People's Commissars.

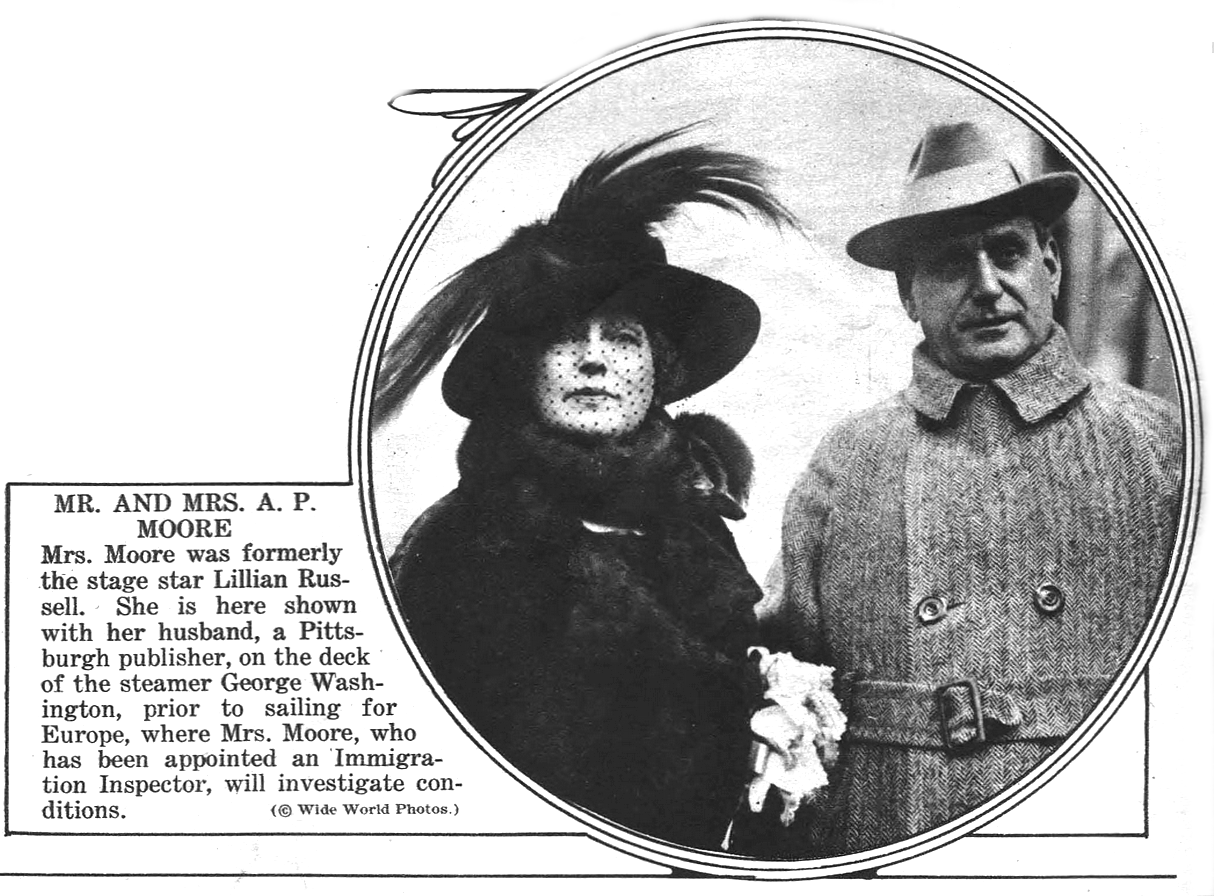
Lillian Russell and her husband in 1922

- Died:
  - Lillian Russell, 60–61, American stage actress and singer, died following an infection from injuries sustained on her return trip back from a fact-finding tour of Europe on behalf of President Harding. (b. 1860/1861)
  - Richard A. Ballinger, 63, U.S. Secretary of the Interior from 1909 to 1911 (b. 1858)

== June 7, 1922 (Wednesday) ==
- The State Farm Mutual Automobile Insurance Company was founded in Bloomington, Illinois by tractor salesman George J. Mecherle, who had organized a mutual insurance company to lower the rates of farmer in central Illinois.
- The British Mount Everest expedition was called off after an avalanche killed seven of the 17 mountaineers on the team of Nepalese Sherpa porters carrying the supplies.
- The Greek Navy armored cruiser Georgios Averof shelled the Turkish city of Samsun, prompting the Ottoman government to deport Greek residents in western towns and villages under Turkish control.
- Born: Hubert du Plessis, South African classical music composer; in Malmesbury, Western Cape (d. 2011)

== June 8, 1922 (Thursday) ==
- King Alexander of Yugoslavia married Maria of Romania in a small cathedral in Belgrade. A crowd of 100,000 people turned out in the rain to watch the royal procession through the streets.
- The Soviet Union's first "show trial", the Trial of the Socialist Revolutionaries, began in Moscow for the 12 members of the Central Committee (led by Abram Gots) of the anti-Bolshevik Socialist Revolutionary Party and 22 other members. With three judges presiding in the traditional Soviet arrangement, the proceedings lasted until August 7. The 12 members of the leadership were all found guilty of conspiracy. Their death sentences were commuted, but all 12 would later be executed for different charges after the Great Purge of 1937.
- Died:
  - Phebe Sudlow, 90, the first female superintendent of a public school system in the United States and the first female professor at the University of Iowa (b. 1831)
  - Henry T. Oxnard, 61, French-born American businessman and founder of the American Crystal Sugar Company, for whom the city of Oxnard, California, is named, died of a heart attack.(b.1860)

== June 9, 1922 (Friday) ==
- Finland's Åland was allowed self-government as the Regional Assembly convened for its first plenary session in Mariehamn. Today, the day is celebrated as Self-Government Day of Åland.
- Polish-born American engineer Joseph T. Tykociner of the University of Illinois gave the first public demonstration in the U.S. of a motion picture with sound recorded directly with the film. His wife, Helena Tykociner, appeared in the short motion picture saying "I will ring," and then ringing a bell.
- In Soviet Russia, the Council of People's Commissars rejected the commercial treaty signed with Italy on May 24.
- Died: William Gowland, 79, British mining engineer known for his work as an archaeologist in Japan (b. 1842)

== June 10, 1922 (Saturday) ==
- Li Yuanhong became President of the Republic of China. After arriving in Beijing, President Li's first act was to appoint the former Chinese Ambassador to the United States, Wu Ting-fang, as the new Prime Minister, with Foreign Minister W. W. Yen as the Acting Premier until Wu's arrival. Premier Wu, however, became sick with pneumonia on his way to Beijing and died four days after the announcement, on June 23.
- The Joint Service Pay Readjustment Act was signed into law by U.S. President Warren G. Harding. The new law provided for equal policies for compensation in the U.S. Armed Forces. An amendment within the Act elevated the United States Coast Guard to a branch of the armed services.
- Henry M. Leland, who had founded the Lincoln Motor Company and his son Wilfred, were fired from management of the Lincoln division of the Ford Motor Company, four months after Ford Motor had purchased the luxury car company. Ernest G. Liebold, representative of Henry Ford, announced that Ford had demanded the resignations of both men.
- Pillory won the Belmont Stakes horse race.
- Born:
  - Judy Garland, American actress and singer; as Frances Gumm, in Grand Rapids, Minnesota (d. 1969)
  - Rose Mofford, American politician and the first woman to serve as Governor of Arizona; as Rose Perica, in Globe, Arizona (d. 2016)
  - Robert Alan Aurthur, American screenwriter, director and producer; in New York City (d. 1978)
  - Bill Kerr, South African-born British and Australian comedian; in Cape Town (d. 2014)
- Died: Harry Collingwood, 79, British children's novelist known for his books about sea adventures (b. 1843)

== June 11, 1922 (Sunday) ==
- An afternoon storm in New York City killed 45 people, including seven who were killed in the collapse of a ferris wheel in the Bronx. Gale-force winds as high as 100 miles per hour (160 km/h) began at 5:30 in the afternoon and lasted for 12 minutes before subsiding. The ferris wheel at the beach at Clason Point Park was 70 feet (21 m) high and had a 10 feet (3.0 m) high base when it was blown over.
- The documentary film Nanook of the North, directed by Robert J. Flaherty, was released.
- Born: Dorothy P. Rice, American statistician whose studies of the economic cost of illness contributed to the passage of Medicare; as Dorothy Pechman, in Brooklyn, New York City (d. 2017)
- Died: Antoinette Dakin Leach, 63, American lawyer, women's rights pioneer and suffragist (b. 1859)

== June 12, 1922 (Monday) ==
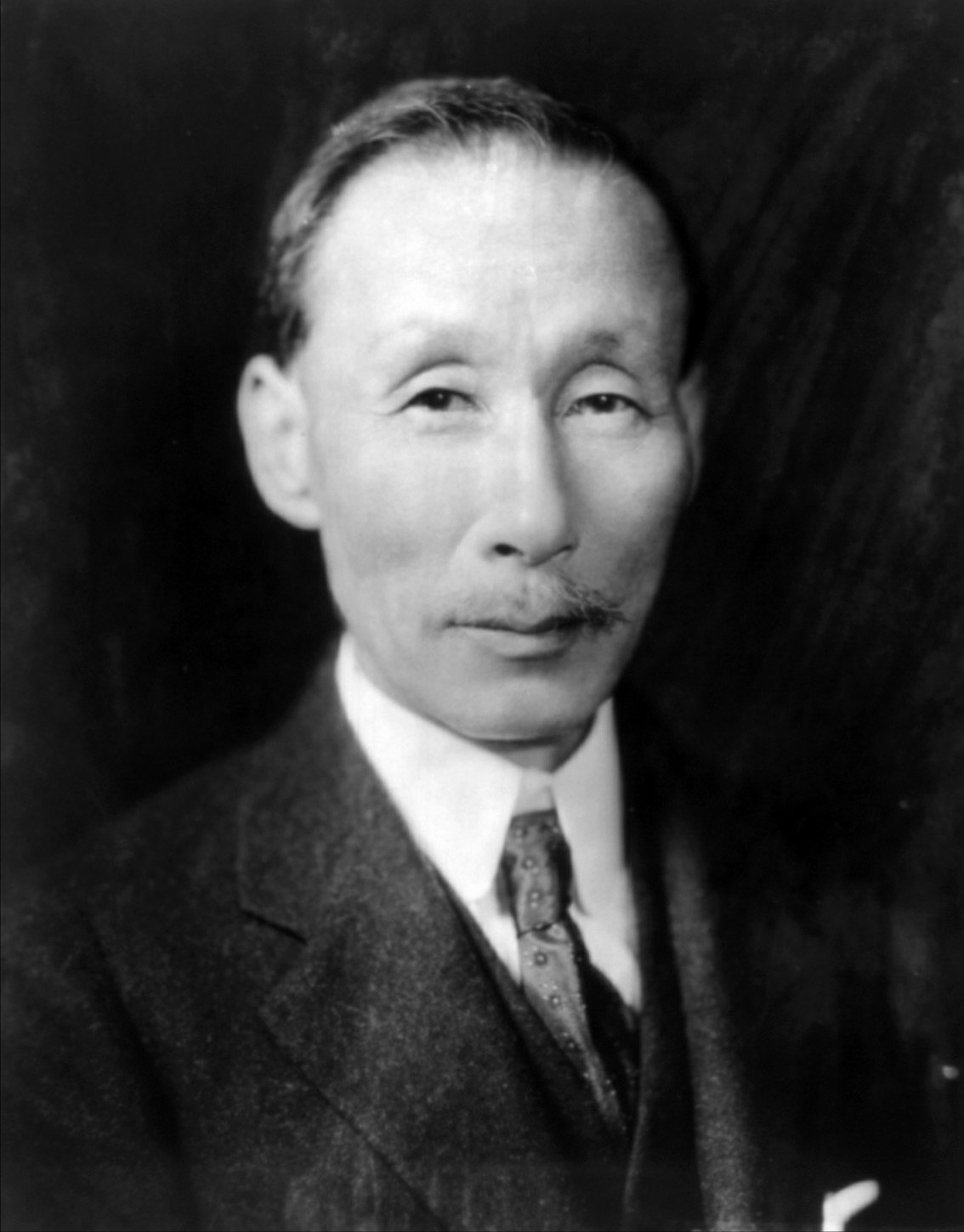
Prime Minister Kato

- Katō Tomosaburō became the 12th Prime Minister of Japan.
- U.S. Army Captain A. W. Stevens set a new world record for highest parachute jump, while Lieutenant Leigh Wade, the airplane pilot who brought him aloft set a world record for highest altitude in an airplane. When the twin-engine Martin bomber reached 24,206 feet (7,378 m) at 1:05 in the afternoon over Springfield, Ohio, Captain Stevens jumped out. During the freefall, Stevens's oxygen tank was torn off. He came down near Jamestown, Ohio after a descent that took half an hour.
- Joseph B. "Frenchy" Duret, a trapper and poacher who had settled north of Yellowstone National Park after emigrating from France to the United States, was killed by a grizzly bear which had been caught in one of his traps. His body was not discovered until the following evening. The story was covered in newspapers throughout the United States during the next several months. The meadows where Duret was buried became known as "Frenchy's Meadows".
- Died: Wolfgang Kapp, 63, Prussian civil servant, journalist and nominal leader of the Kapp Putsch, died of cancer. (b. 1858)

== June 13, 1922 (Tuesday) ==
- France granted Austria a loan of 55 million francs.
- Born: Mel Parnell, American professional baseball player; in New Orleans (d. 2012)
- Died: Fleming D. Cheshire, 71, American businessman and foreign language interpreter who served as the Consul-General of the United States in China during the Boxer Rebellion of 1900 (b. 1849)

== June 14, 1922 (Wednesday) ==
- Warren G. Harding became the first U.S. president to be heard on commercial radio, addressing a crowd at the dedication of a memorial site for Francis Scott Key in Baltimore.
- The Bashkir Autonomous Soviet Socialist Republic was created within the Russian Soviet Republic to provide limited self-government for the Bashkir people.
- Died: Hesketh Hesketh-Prichard, 45, Indian-born British explorer, hunter and adventurer, died from sepsis and complications of malaria. (b. 1876)

== June 15, 1922 (Thursday) ==
- A 79% decrease in alcohol-related deaths, since the advent of Prohibition of the sale of liquor in the United States, was announced by Ralph Day, the Director of the U.S. Bureau of Prohibition, who provided statistics from the New York City Department of Health to Roy Asa Haynes, the Assistant U.S. Treasury Secretary and Prohibition Commissioner.
- The draft of the new Irish constitution was made public on the eve of the 1922 general election. Women would be given the vote and the controversial Oath of Allegiance to the king was to be maintained. The document was subject to the ratification of the parliament of the United Kingdom pursuant to the terms of the Anglo-Irish Treaty.
- Much of the Averne neighborhood of Queens, in New York City, was leveled by a devastating fire that left 10,000 people homeless. The New York Times described the event as "fire that was disastrous in the extent of its sweep and left a whole city marveling that no lives were lost."
- The Permanent Court of International Justice of the League of Nations, referred to in the press as "the World Court", opened for its first regular sessions, convening at the Carnegie Peace Palace at The Hague in the Netherlands.

== June 16, 1922 (Friday) ==
- The Irish general election was held in Ireland, with the Sinn Féin party candidates disagreeing over the issue of signing a treaty with Great Britain to create the Irish Free State. The Pro-Treaty faction of Sinn Féin, led by Michael Collins won 58 of the 128 seats, six short of a majority, while the Anti-Treaty faction of Éamon de Valera in the same party won 36. The other 34 seats were divided among the Labour Party (17), independents (9), the Farmers' Party (7) and the Businessman's Party (1).
- General Chen Chiung-ming, formerly the governor of China's Guandong province, captured Guangzhou and announced the departure of Southern China's secessionist leaders, including President Sun Yat-sen. General Chen said also that the former legislative members of the old Chinese government were in favor of plans to reunite the south with the Republic of China's government at Beijing.
- The De la Huerta–Lamont Treaty was signed in Mexico, providing for a plan for Mexico to begin paying the past-due interest on its government bonds beginning in 1923. Mexico's Finance Minister Adolfo de la Huerta signed for his government and American banker Thomas W. Lamont signed as chairman of the International Committee of Bankers on Mexico (ICBM). President Álvaro Obregón would abrogate the treaty on June 30, 1924, after $16,250,000 had been paid to the ICBM Bankers.
- Tornadoes swept through the northwestern part of the U.S. state of Wisconsin, killing at least 25 people and injuring more than 50 in the counties of St. Croix, Polk, Barron and Dunn. The area hardest hit was in and around village of Prairie Farm, Wisconsin, where 18 people died.
- Henry Berliner demonstrated a helicopter prototype in the presence of experts at the U.S. Navy Department's Bureau of Aeronautics at College Park, Maryland. Berliner raised and lowered the copter three times, hovering at 7 feet (2.1 m), then flew the machine around a nearby half-mile (0.83 kilometers) track.

== June 17, 1922 (Saturday) ==
- English motorist Malcolm Campbell set a new land speed record of 134.75 miles per hour (216.86 km/h), but the international motorsport authority in Paris refused to recognize it as official because it was not recorded with the specified electrical measuring devices.
- Born:
  - Son Duk-sung, Korean martial artist and co-founder of taekwondo; in Gyeongseong, Chōsen (present-day Seoul, South Korea) (d. 2011)
  - Louis S. Peterson, American playwright, actor, screenwriter and professor, the first African American playwright to have a production on Broadway, for 1953's Take a Giant Step; in Hartford, Connecticut (d. 1998)
- Died: Kaymakam Kemal Bey, Ottoman Empire governor of Menemen in Turkey's İzmir Province, was assassinated in the Menemen massacre.

== June 18, 1922 (Sunday) ==
- The First Zhili–Fengtian War officially ended in China with an armistice signed aboard the British cruiser HMS Curlew.
- A Kurdish uprising began in Iraq.
- Two English members of the British Antarctic Expedition of 1920, who had been marooned in Antarctica for more than a year near Andvord Bay on the west coast of Graham Land, returned to Britain, landing at Newcastle. Maxime C. Lester of the British Mercantile Marine and Thomas W. Bagshawe, a student at the University of Cambridge, had landed in December 1920 during the Antarctic summer after Sir Ernest Shackleton's ship Endurance had been crushed by the ice. Lester Cove and Bagshawe Glacier, both located in Graham Land, would later be named in their honor.
- Born:
  - Claude Helffer, French pianist; in Paris (d. 2004)
  - Nela Eržišnik, Croatian Yugoslavian actress and comedian; as Nevenka Maras. in Banja Luka, Kingdom of the Serbs, Croats and Slovenes (present-day Bosnia and Herzegovina) (d. 2007)
- Died: Jacobus Kapteyn, 71, Dutch astronomer (b. 1851)

== June 19, 1922 (Monday) ==
- The New York Times reported that biochemist E. V. McCollum had isolated a new vitamin called Vitamin D which prevented rickets. Dr. McCollum told reporters that studies since 1910 had shown that there were at least three vitamins, labeled A, B and C, and that "Recently my assistants and I have demonstrated the existence of a fourth vitamin which is concerned with bone growth."
- The U.S. Navy submarine tender USS Beaver landed at Wake Island in the South Pacific Ocean, and surveyors led by Lieutenant Commander Sherwood Picking investigated the feasibility of making the island a strategically located fueling station to provide coal and oil for U.S. Navy ships.
- The U.S. Senate passed its annual naval appropriation bill, but defeated an amendment by William H. King to withdraw American troops from Haiti, Nicaragua and the Dominican Republic.
- The regional legislatures of China's three Manchurian provinces, where Zhang Zuolin had attempted to establish a separate kingdom, sent telegrams to the Chinese government in Beijing, announcing that they were ready to reunite with the rest of China under the control of President Li Yuan-hung with Wu Ting-fang as Premier. On the same day, the military leader of southern China, General Chen Chiung-ming, sent a dispatch from Nanjing, that he was prepared for unification as well after having carried out a coup against Sun Yat-sen, who had operated a separate government.
- Born:
  - Aage Bohr, Danish nuclear physicist and 1975 Nobel Prize laureate; in Copenhagen (d. 2009)
  - Ahmad Yani, Commander of the Indonesian Army until he was killed in the 30 September coup attempt; in Purworejo, Java, Dutch East Indies (present-day Indonesia) (d. 1965)
  - V. Balakrishna Eradi, Indian jurist and served as a judge on the Supreme Court of India from 1981 to 1987; as Vettath Balakrishna Eradi, in Calicut, Madras Province, British India (present-day Kozhikode, Kerala, India) (d. 2010)
  - Joan Thirsk, British historian; as Irene Joan Watkins, in St Pancras, London (d. 2013)
- Died: Hitachiyama Taniemon, 48, Japanese professional sumo wrestler (b. 1874)

== June 20, 1922 (Tuesday) ==
- In accordance with the terms of the German–Polish Convention regarding Upper Silesia, signed on May 15 after voting in a plebiscite on March 20, the German territory of Ostoberschlesien was ceded to Poland to become part of the Slaskie province. Polish Army troops entered the area while German troops withdrew. Among the cities that became part of Poland were Katowice (formerly Kattowitz); Giszowiec (Gieschewald); Chorzów (Königshütte); Tychy (Tichau); Częstochowa (Tschenstochau); Sosnowiec (Sosnowitz); Pszczyna (Pless); and Miasteczko (Georgenburg).

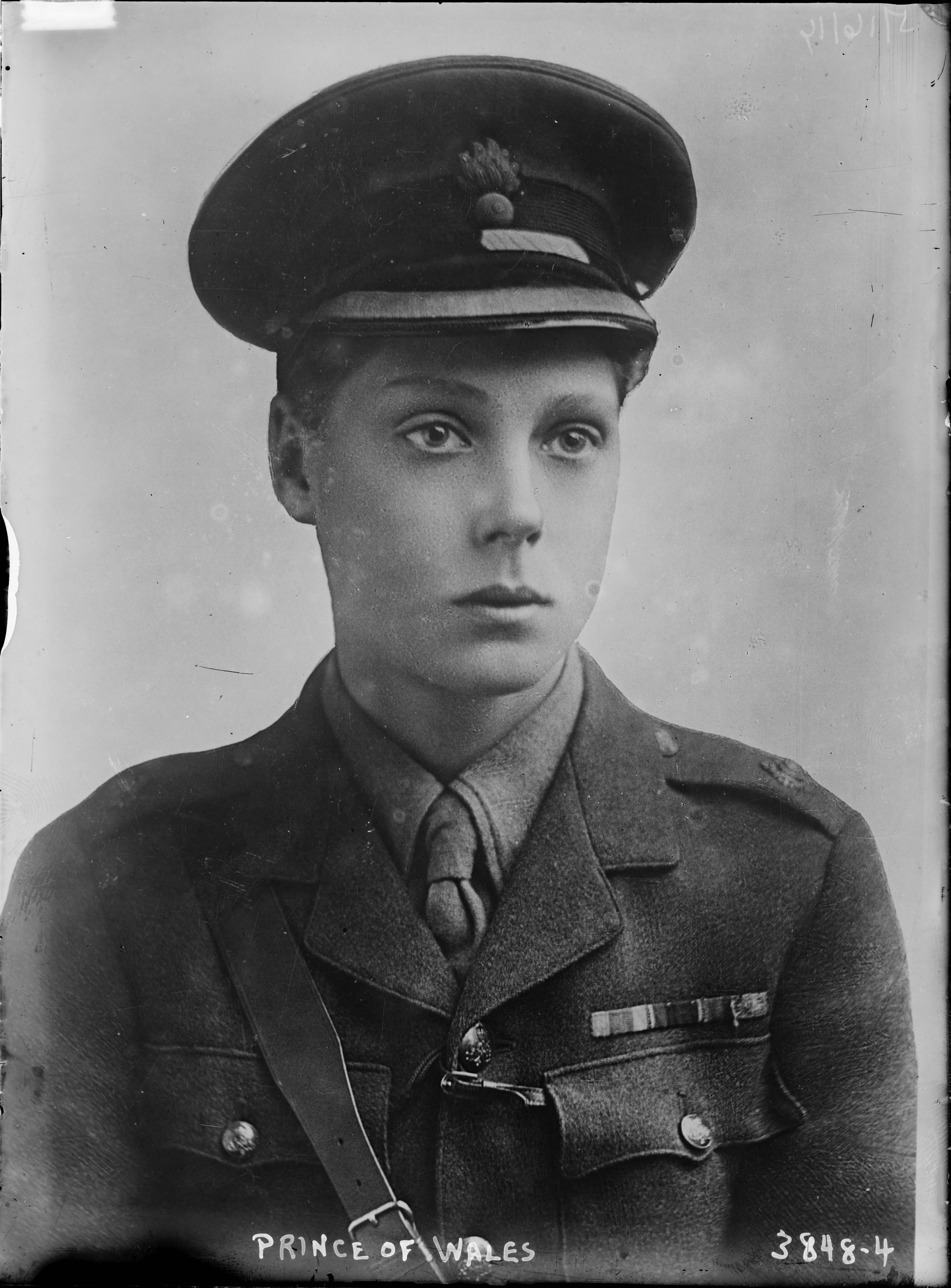
Edward, Prince of Wales

- Edward, Prince of Wales returned to London after an eight-month tour of the Far East. The Prince, who would become King Edward VIII in 1936, stepped off the Royal Navy cruiser HMS Renown at Plymouth, where he was greeted by his younger brother Albert, Duke of York who would become King George VI upon Edward's abdication. The next day, he was cheered as his train passed by railway stations from Devonshire to London.
- King Ferdinand I of Romania signed a general amnesty for 213 of 261 members of the Romanian Communist Party who had been convicted of sedition in 1921. Excluded from amnesty were 48 of the defendants, who stood accused of high treason, military espionage or terrorist attacks.
- The United Services Automobile Association (USAA), an American insurance and investment company that provides financial services to veterans of the U.S. Armed Forces, was founded in San Antonio, Texas by 25 U.S. Army officers. The original name of the company was United States Army Automobile Association.
- Died: Vittorio Monti, 54, Italian composer and conductor (b. 1868)

== June 21, 1922 (Wednesday) ==
- A group of 22 non-union strikebreakers were brutally murdered by a mob at the Southern Illinois Coal Company near Herrin, Illinois. Victims who weren't immediately shot were taken on a "death march" of several miles before being killed.
- The House of Lords voted, 60 to 29, to oppose the British government's policy in the British Mandate for Palestine after hearing Lord Balfour's first speech since his elevation to the nobility.
- The U.S. state of Arizona got its first licensed radio station, KFAD in Phoenix.
- Born: Pat Ramage, Canadian skiing coach; as Patricia Ramage, in Vancouver (d. 2003)
- Died: Take Ionescu, 63, Romanian politician and journalist who served for a month as Prime Minister of Romania in December 1921 and January 1922, died of typhoid fever traced to eating oysters in Italy.(b. 1858)

== June 22, 1922 (Thursday) ==
- Sir Henry Wilson, Field Marshal in the British Army, Chief of the Imperial General Staff during World War I and Member of Parliament for North Down, was shot dead outside his home at 36 Eaton Place S.W. in London. Baron Wilson had just returned from ceremonies for the unveiling of the Great Eastern Railway War Memorial at the Liverpool Street Station and was struck by six bullets when two men ambushed him at 2:20 in the afternoon as he and his wife stepped out of a taxicab. Two police officers and Wilson's chauffeur were killed in the process of pursuing the attackers, two London-based members of the Irish Republican Army, Reginald Dunne and Joseph O'Sullivan, were chased down and arrested. Dunne and O'Sullivan would be convicted of murder and hanged on August 10, 1922.
- U.S. President Harding told a delegation of representatives from the Philippine Islands, headed by Manuel Quezon, that the U.S. territory was not yet ready for independence that had been promised as an eventuality to the Filipino people. Harding said in a statement, "With reiterated assurance that we mean to hold no people under the flag who do not rejoice in that relationship, I must say to you that the time is not yet for independence. I can imagine a continued progress which will make our bonds either easy to sever, or rivet them more firmly because you will it to be so."
- The Lincoln Highway bridge over the Hackensack River in New Jersey was toppled when the steamship Glenaruel crashed into it. The bridge would be replaced in 1927 and collapse a year later on December 15, 1928.
- Born: Mona Lisa, Filipino film actress; as Gloria Lerma Yatco, in Tondo, Manila, U.S. Philippine Islands territory (d. 2019)
- Died:
  - Sir Alexander MacRobert, 68, Scottish entrepreneur and founder of the British India Corporation;,died of a heart attack. (b. 1854)
  - Theodore C. Marceau, 61, American photographer and businessman, died of a heart attack. (b. 1859)

== June 23, 1922 (Friday) ==
- Premier Wu Ting-fang of China became sick with pneumonia while in Guangzhou on his way to Beijing and died, days after being appointed to serve as the new Prime Minister of a reunified China.
- The Canadian schooner Puritan foundered off of Nova Scotia's Sable Island, and 16 of her 19 crew were killed.
- London police arrested 20 men in connection with the assassination of Sir Henry Wilson.
- Walter Hagen the first American-born winner of golf's British Open, achieving victory by a single stroke on 72 holes. Hagen finished with a score of 300, while George Duncan and Jim Barnes and were tied for second with 301. Jock Hutchison, a U.S. citizen who had been born in Scotland, had won the Open in 1921.

== June 24, 1922 (Saturday) ==
- Germany Foreign Minister Walther Rathenau was assassinated outside his home in the Berlin suburb of Grunewald by nationalist extremists, while being chauffeured in a convertible to the Foreign Ministry in Berlin. Dr. Rathenau was reportedly struck by at least eight bullets, including one to the brain. Three men in another car, driven by Ernst Werner Techow, pulled alongside Rathenau's vehicle and one, Erwin Kern, fired at Rachenau with an MP 18 submachine gun.
- Meeting in Columbus, Ohio, owners of the first nationwide pro football circuit in the U.S., the American Professional Football Association, voted to change the organization's name to the National Football League.
- The English Ladies Football Association, the first soccer football league for women, held its first, and only championship. The Stoke team won the ELFA Challenge Cup, defeating Doncaster & Bentley, 3 to 1, before 2,000 spectators in the rain at Cobridge. Goals for the Stoke Ladies were scored by Daisy Bates, Elsie Stanyer and team captain Dollie Cooper, while Emma Smith scored for Doncaster.
- Japan announced it would withdraw its remaining occupational forces from the Soviet Russian territory of Siberia, with the exception of Sakhalin Island, by the end of October. The last troops left Mainland Russia on October 25, 1922.
- In Munich, Adolf Hitler began serving his prison sentence for disturbing the peace and assaulting Otto Ballerstedt.
- Governor Len Small of the U.S. state of Illinois was found not guilty by a jury in Waukegan after a nine-week trial on charges of embezzlement of state funds. Upon his return home to Kankakee the next day, his wife Ida suffered a fatal stroke during a party to celebrate the acquittal and she died a few hours later.
- Born: Tata Giacobetti, Italian singer and jazz musician; in Rome, Kingdom of Italy (d. 1988)
- Died:
  - William Rockefeller, 81, American businessman and financier, died of pneumonia. (b. 1841)
  - Alexander Antonov, 32, Russian dissident and one of the leaders of the Tambov Rebellion during the Russian Civil War, was killed in a gun battle with agents of the Cheka outside the village of Shybriay near Borisoglebsk. (b. 1889)

== June 25, 1922 (Sunday) ==
- After a standoff of almost two years, the United States granted an application for Western Union to complete an undersea telegraphic cable between Bridgetown in Barbados, to Miami in the United States, as part of a cable network to connect Brazil and the U.S. On August 4, 1920, the U.S. Navy had blocked a freighter from entering U.S. territorial waters until Brazil agreed to allow American businesses license to operate there.
- A coroner's jury in Williamson County, Illinois, assigned responsibility to officials of the Southern Illinois Coal Company for the murder of 21 workers killed in mine violence.
- Died: Satyendranath Dutta, 40, Indian Bengali language poet (b. 1882)

== June 26, 1922 (Monday) ==
- In a speech before the House of Commons, Secretary of State for the Colonies Winston Churchill warned the newly elected government in Southern Ireland that if it did not act to oust its rebels occupying the Four Courts, the British would.
- Irish rebels kidnapped General J. J. "Ginger" O'Connell in retaliation for the arrest earlier that day of Leo Henderson who was leading a raid on Ferguson's garage.
- King George V opened the Wimbledon Championships at their new site on Queen's Road.
- The Hague Conference began in the Netherlands, aimed at settling the debt of Soviet Russia to the Allies.
- Born: Eleanor Parker, American film and TV actress; in Cedarville, Ohio (d. 2013)
- Died: Albert I, 73, Prince of Monaco and the nation's ruling monarch since 1889, died after a reign of almost 32 years. Albert, who succumbed to complications from abdominal surgery two weeks earlier, was succeeded by his eldest son, Prince Louis II, who would rule until 1949. During his reign, The New York Times noted, Albert set up "the great gambling halls of Monte Carlo that have carried the name of Monaco to every corner of the world." He was also renowned as an oceanographer and won the Agassiz gold medal from the National Academy of Sciences in the U.S. for his work in oceanography.

== June 27, 1922 (Tuesday) ==
- A freak railway accident in Germany killed 26 people, and seriously injured 30 others, outside of Berlin. According to reports from correspondents for the London Times and for the Associated Press, an overcrowded train had "Trittbrettfahrerinnen", passengers who hadn't bought tickets and were standing on the outside on the running boards outside the train cars and disaster struck when the train "was passed by another train going in the opposite direction" and which had a door that was swinging open. According to the dispatches, "The door swept scores of persons off the footboard" and "several of the dead were crushed under the wheels."
- Edward M. Fuller & Company, one of the major stock brokerage firms in the U.S. on Wall Street, went bankrupt. Shortly afterward, both Edward M. Fuller and his partner, W. Frank McGee, were indicted for "bucketing", essentially an operation for having customers bet on the rise or fall of the prices of individual stocks without any actual transfer of stock certificates or commodities.
- The United States extended formal recognition to Albania, Estonia, Latvia and Lithuania.
- Died: Prince Higashifushimi Yorihito, 54, Japanese prince who was the last head of the Komatsu-no-miya (b. 1867)

== June 28, 1922 (Wednesday) ==
- The Syrian Federation (Federation of the Autonomous States of Syria) was constituted from the states of Damascus, Aleppo and the Territory of the Alawites as part of the League of Nations Mandate for Syria and the Lebanon, by order number 1459-B of French Army General Henri Gouraud.
- In Dublin, the National Army troops demanded the surrender of the anti-Treaty IRA garrison in the Four Courts. When the IRA rebels maintained their positions, the government troops launched an artillery attack, beginning the Irish Civil War.
- Artur Śliwiński became the acting Prime Minister of Poland after the resignation of Antoni Ponikowski. He served for only three days before being succeeded by Dr. Julian Nowak.
- Born: Joan Tighe, Irish journalist and historian; in Dublin (d. 2014)
- Died: Velimir Khlebnikov, 36, Russian poet and playwright (b. 1885)

== June 29, 1922 (Thursday) ==
- The French government made 100 hectares (250 acres) of land at Vimy Ridge (in the Nord-Pas-de-Calais region of France) available to Canada free of taxation, effective December 5, 1922, to be used for construction of a war memorial to the more than 60,000 Canadians killed in World War I.
- Born:
  - San Baw, Burmese orthopedic surgeon; in Tapun, Tharrawaddy District, British Burma (present-day Myanmar) (d. 1984)
  - Maraden Panggabean, Indonesian general, served as the Indonesian Minister of Defense from 1971 to 1978; in Taroetoeng, Dutch East Indies (present-day Tarutung, North Sumatra, Indonesia) (d. 2000)
  - Jack Vessey, American career officer in the U.S. Army, served as the Chairman of the Joint Chiefs of Staff from 1982 to 1985; in Minneapolis (d. 2016)
  - Vasko Popa, Yugoslavian Serbian poet; in Grebenac, Kingdom of the Serbs, Croats, and Slovenes (present-day Serbia) (d. 1991)

== June 30, 1922 (Friday) ==
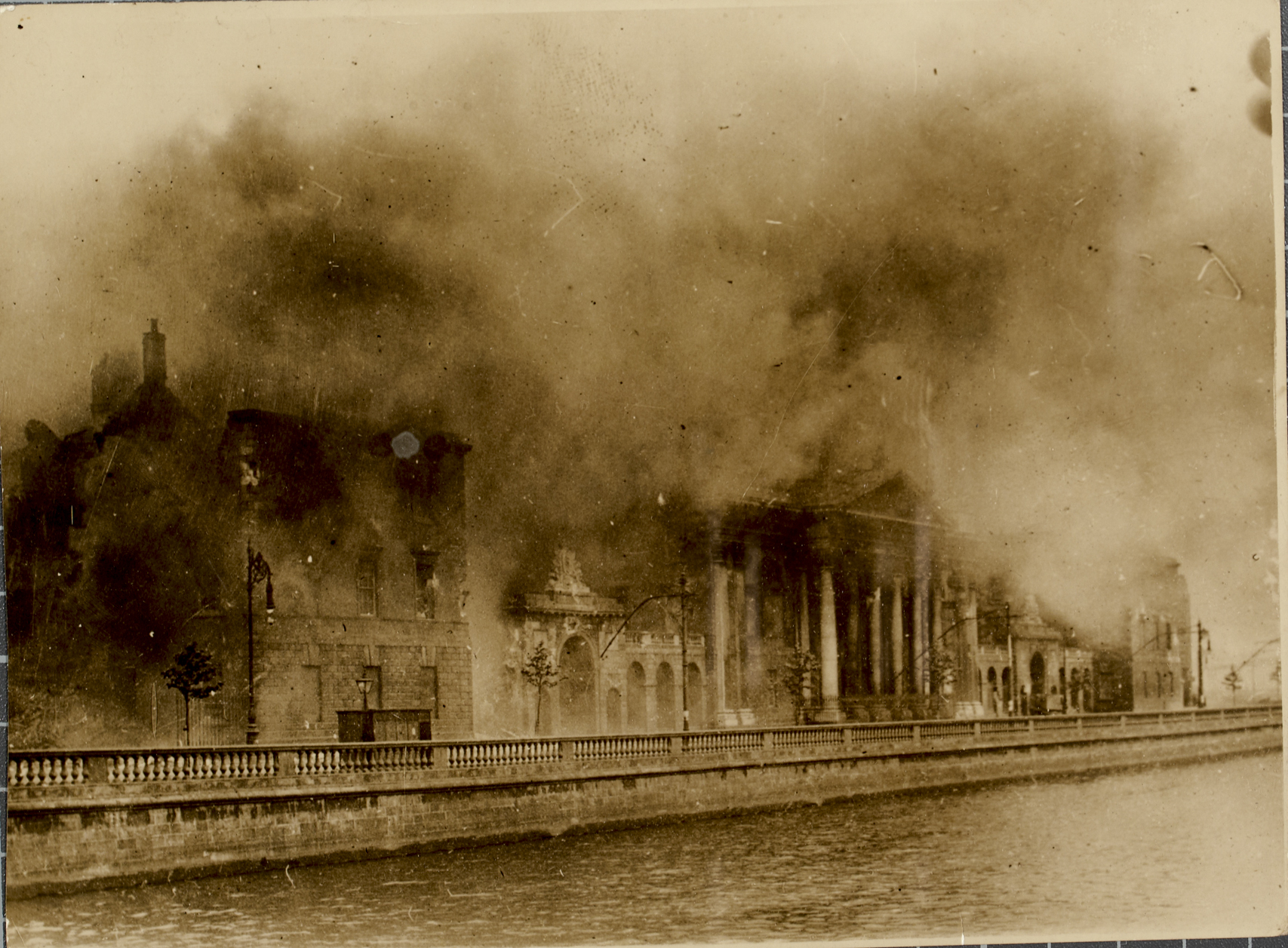
The Four Courts on fire

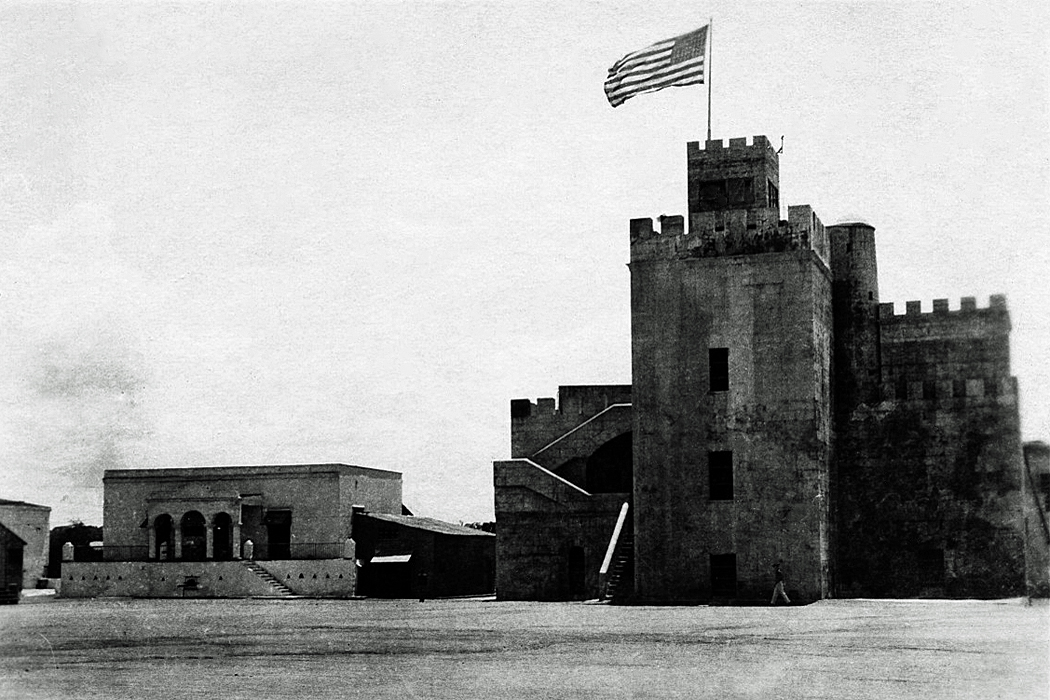
U.S. flag over a seized Dominican Republic fort

- There was an enormous explosion, followed by a fire, in the Four Courts building in Dublin after munitions were ignited by shelling at 12:30. A cease-fire order was given at 3:30 so that the injured could be tended to. The IRA garrison, represented by Ernie O'Malley surrendered to Brigadier General O'Daly at 4:00 p.m. Rory O'Connor, who led the takeover of the Four Courts, was among 130 men taken prisoner.
- The U.S. government agreed to end the American military occupation of the Dominican Republic, which had started in 1916, and began making plans with Dominican officials to hold elections to establish a national government. The last American troops withdrew in 1924.
- The U.S. Congress officially endorsed America's support for the Balfour Declaration through the passage of the Lodge–Fish Resolution.
- Born: Amulya Barua, Indian Assamese poet; in Jorhat, Assam Province, British India (present-day Assam state (d. 1946, killed)
- Died: Tiny Maxwell, 37, American professional football player and sports editor, died from injuries sustained in an automobile accident. (b. 1884)
