= Ruth Brinker =

Ruth Marie Brinker (May 1, 1922 – August 8, 2011) was an American AIDS activist and founder of the nonprofit, Project Open Hand. She began her activism in 1985 by providing food and meals to home-bound AIDS patients in San Francisco who were too ill cook or shop.

Brinker was born Ruth Marie Appel on May 1, 1922, in Hartford, South Dakota. She moved to San Francisco, California, during the mid-1950s, where she married her husband, Jack Brinker, in 1957. They had two daughters, Lisa and Sara, but later divorced in 1965.

By the mid-1980s, the AIDS epidemic was sweeping through San Francisco. One of Brinker's friends, who had AIDS and corresponding malnutrition, became too weak to cook or leave his home to go grocery shopping. Brinker, who was a grandmother at the time, and a group of her friends collaborated to provide the man with meals by dividing up the month to delivering them to his home. Unfortunately, some of the volunteers went on vacation and the man died by the time they returned to San Francisco.

Ruth Brinker vowed not to allow the same fate happen to others in San Francisco. She had previously worked in the food service industry and as a volunteer for Meals on Wheels, a similar predecessor which provides meals to people who cannot purchase or prepare meals. She began organizing volunteers on a larger basis to deliver hot meals to AIDS patients in the city. This led to the establishment of her nonprofit, Project Open Hand, which was founded in summer of 1985 by Brinker and seven of her friends. The organization began with a small grant of $2,000 from a Zen study group and donated cookware. Project Open Hand has since expanded to provide meals and other services to the elderly and people with other chronic illnesses. In 1987 and 1988, Project Open Hand served 300 AIDS patients using an annual budget of $500,000. As of 2011, Project Open Hand provides 2,600 meals a day using $5.6 million in public and private donations. Brinker's nonprofit has been copied by "dozens" of organizations throughout the United States, according to the New York Times.

Ruth Brinker died from complications of vascular dementia at her home in San Francisco on August 8, 2011, at age 89.
