= Project Open Hand =

US nonprofit organization

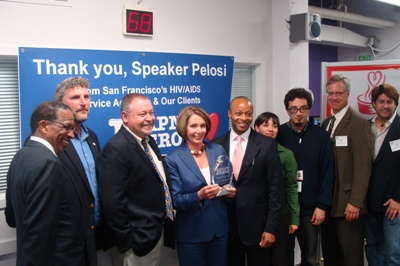
April 15, 2009 ~ Congresswoman Pelosi meets with members of San Francisco's Project Open Hand.

Project Open Hand is a California nonprofit organization that provides medically tailored meals and groceries to elderly and homebound people in San Francisco and Alameda County. Founded in 1985 to deliver meals to people with AIDS, it also took over food banks in the 1980s and 1990s and in the 21st century extended its services to include people with other acute and chronic conditions and to serve lunches to seniors. Its headquarters are at 730 Polk Street in the Tenderloin; its CEO is Paul Hepfer.

== History ==
Project Open Hand was created in 1985 by Ruth Brinker, who had worked in food service and as an executive director for Meals on Wheels and recognized the relatively small number of social services for those infected with HIV and their particular need for nourishing food since there was at the time no treatment for AIDS. It began as meal service to seven people with AIDS, paid for by a $2,000 grant from the San Francisco Zen Center and the Golden Gate Business Association. Meals were initially cooked in her kitchen and later at Trinity Episcopal Church; in 1987, a grant from the Chevron Corporation enabled a move to a professional kitchen, and Project Open Hand took over a food bank. In 1991, it also took over the AIDS Food Bank from the San Francisco AIDS Foundation. It served 500 meals a day by 1988, and opened its Oakland branch on October 17, 1989, the day of the Loma Prieta earthquake; it opened a second professional kitchen in Oakland in 1996, and in 1997 moved to 730 Polk Street, which it had purchased as its headquarters.

Tom Nolan, executive director from 1994 to 2011, began expanding the organization's mission to include senior citizens and people with serious illnesses other than AIDS and chronic conditions such as diabetes. Nolan was succeeded by Kevin Winge, who expanded food pickup services from those with HIV or breast cancer to people with other conditions including diabetes and heart disease, followed in 2016 by Mark Ryle. Paul Hepfer became executive director in March 2019.

In 2014–16, Project Open Hand participated in a study by the University of California, San Francisco of the role of nutritious food in supporting the sick; since its institution in June 2017, it has played a major role in Food is Medicine, a three-year state-funded pilot project to provide medically tailored meals to chronically ill people receiving assistance through Medi-Cal, the California version of Medicaid.

Much of the organization's work is done by volunteers, 125 a day in 2003. It is funded by a combination of donations, including from foundations such as the Isabel Allende Foundation, federal, and city assistance. As of June 1996 it delivered 1,600 dinners a day and 1,500 bags of groceries a week, and provided as many as 300 bags of groceries to walk-in clients at its food bank. As of July 2003 it was serving almost 2,000 clients a day, and in 2004 it had a total of 30,000 clients. As of August 2011 it was receiving $5.6 million a year in donations and government funding and serving almost 2,600 meals a day, to seniors and people with cancer and other serious illnesses in addition to AIDS, as well as providing groceries. As of April 2015 it had a $10 million budget and served approximately 8,000 clients, including 4,400 in the senior lunch program. As of February 2019 it provided 2,500 meals and 200 bags of groceries a day. Until 2020, when the COVID-19 pandemic prevented it, it also hosted holiday gatherings at the end of the year.

Responding to the AIDS emergency led many charities formed at the time, including Project Open Hand, to prioritize services over bookkeeping; after being taken to task by the Bay Area Reporter, the organization instituted a board of directors and reduced pay for the director. In the late 1980s and early 1990s its finances were investigated and no improprieties found.

Singer-songwriter Sylvester dictated in his will that posthumous proceeds from his albums would be directed to Project Open Hand and the AIDS Emergency Fund. After the fulfillment of his past debts in the 1990s, the balance of his proceeds have been split between the two organizations since.
