= February 1922 =

Month of 1922

<<	February 1922					>>
Su	Mo	Tu	We	Th	Fr	Sa
			1	2	3	4
5	6	7	8	9	10	11
12	13	14	15	16	17	18
19	20	21	22	23	24	25
26	27	28

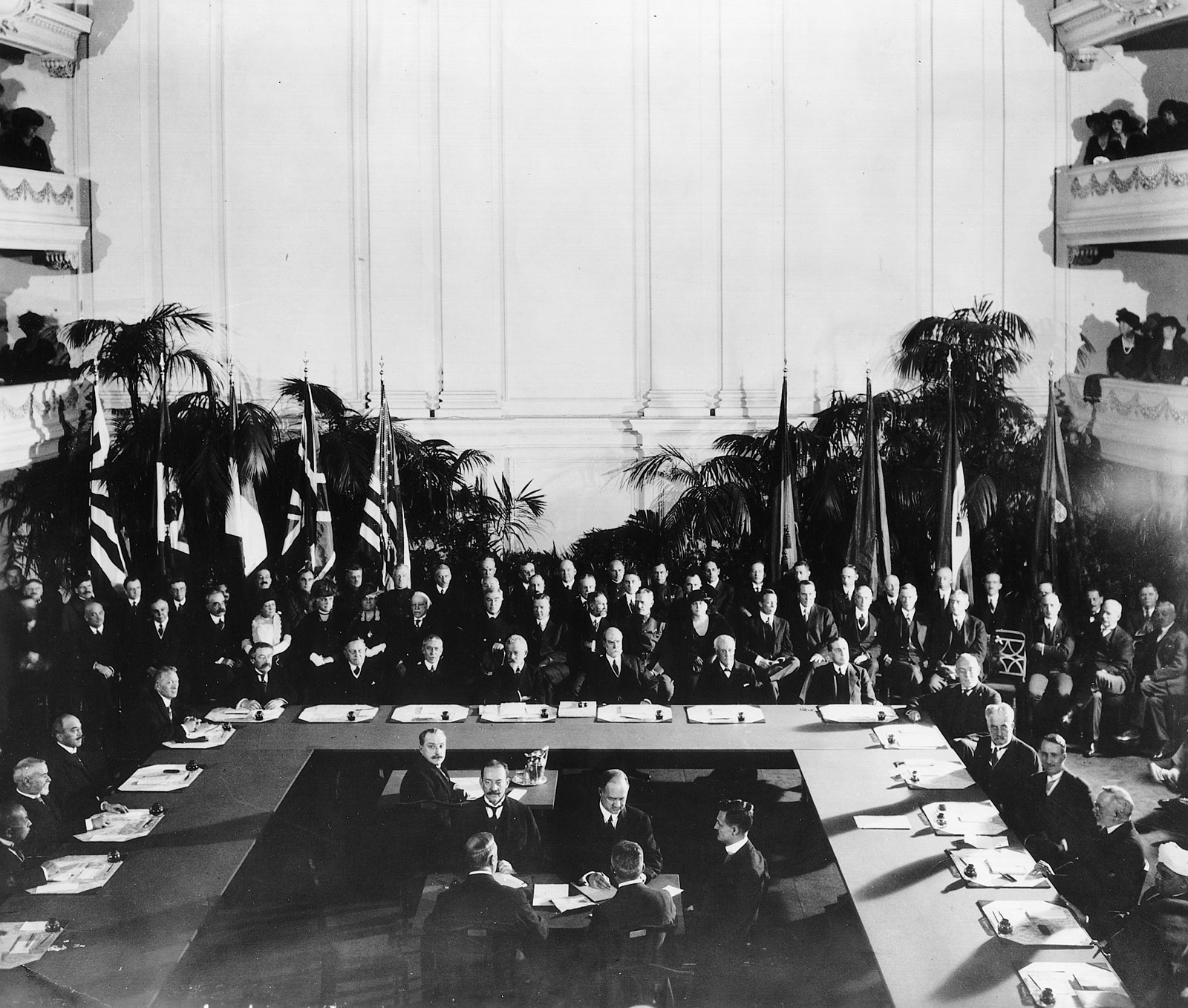
February 6, 1922: Washington Disarmament Conference treaties signed by world's superpowers

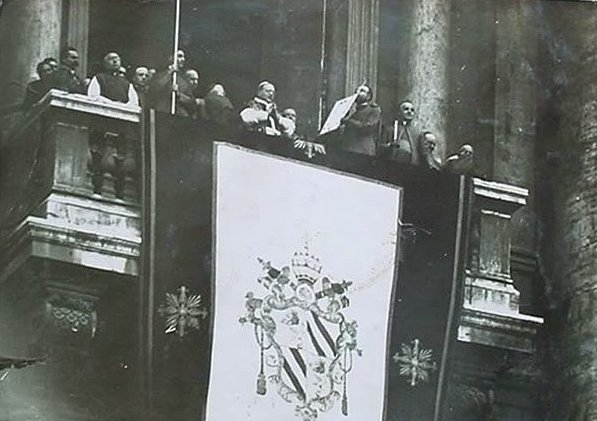
February 6, 1922: Archbishop Achille Ratti of Milan elected as Pope Pius XI

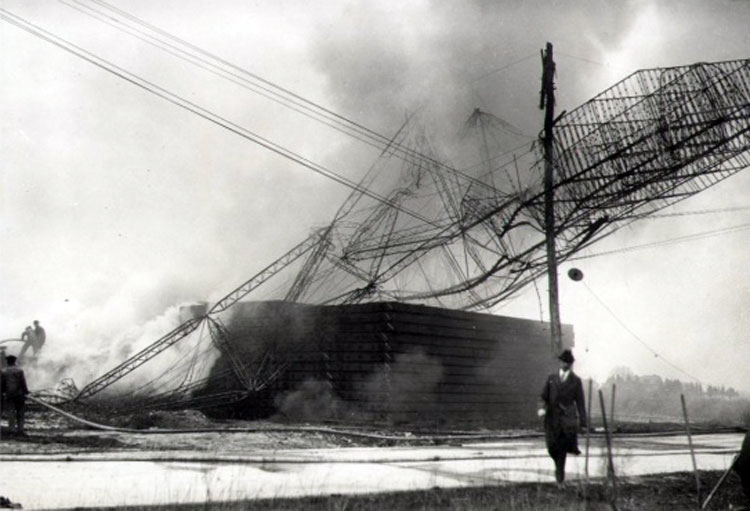
February 21, 1922: Worst U.S. aviation disaster up to that time kills 34 passengers and crew on the dirigible Roma after it crashes into power lines and explodes in Virginia

The following events occurred in February 1922:

== February 1, 1922 (Wednesday) ==
- Representatives of the five major world powers represented at the Conference on the Limitation of Armament (the United States, the United Kingdom, Empire of Japan, France and the Kingdom of Italy) and of four other nations (including Germany, the Soviet Union, and Republic of China) voted to adopt eight treaties, including the Washington Naval Treaty, with a signing ceremony scheduled for February 6.
- Germany's 700,000 rail workers went on strike for one week before the labor dispute was settled.
- The British government announced that it would return the 288-square-mile (750 km^{2}) territory of Port Edward (now Weihaiwei in Shandong province) to China in eight years, as part of the agreements reached at the Washington Disarmament Conference.
- Walther Rathenau became the new German Foreign Minister.
- Born:
  - Renata Tebaldi, Italian opera soprano, and star at Milan's La Scala and New York's Metropolitan Opera; in Pesaro (d. 2004)
  - Robert E. Bourdeau, American physicist, known for his studies of Earth's ionosphere in conjunction with the Explorer 8 satellite in 1960; in Turners Falls, Massachusetts (d. 2010)

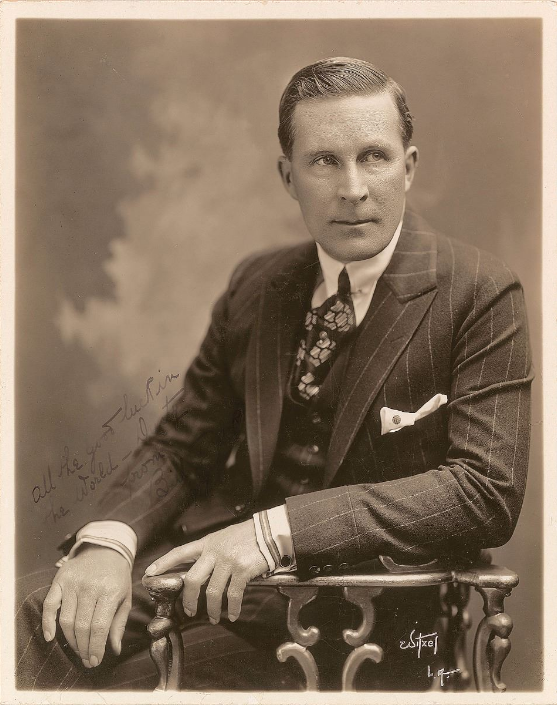
Film director William Desmond Taylor was murdered

- Died:
  - William Desmond Taylor, 49, Irish-born American film director and actor, was shot in the back at his home in the affluent Westlake neighborhood of Los Angeles. His body was found the next day in his bungalow at the Alvarado Court Apartments, and initially declared to be a hemorrhage; the wound was not discovered until after the body was removed from his home. The murder was never solved, and the prime suspect, Taylor's former personal assistant Edward F. Sands, was never seen after Taylor's death. (b. 1872)
  - Prince Yamagata Aritomo, 83, Japanese statesman, served as Prime Minister of Japan from 1889 to 1891 and from 1898 to 1900 and chief adviser to the Emperor from 1909 until his death (b. 1838)

== February 2, 1922 (Thursday) ==
- The first complete printing of the controversial and groundbreaking modernist novel Ulysses, by Irish writer James Joyce, appeared in a bookshop window, printed by the French publisher Darantiere at the initiative of American bookseller and Paris resident Sylvia Beach. The February 2 date was timed for Joyce's 40th birthday.
- The Checker Cab Manufacturing Company was founded in Kalamazoo, Michigan by 28-year-old Russian immigrant Morris Markin through an acquisition by his own Markin Automobile Company of Commonwealth Motor Company. For the next 60 years, Markin's company was the supplier for the Checker Cab service and, beginning in 1929, the Yellow Cab Company, the two largest taxi services.
- The papal conclave, to elect a successor to the late Pope Benedict XV, began in Rome as 53 of the 60 Roman Catholic cardinals assembled at the Sistine Chapel.
- The Soviet newspaper Pravda published the results of a survey among its readers, who opposed the decision by Vladimir Lenin to attend an economic conference in Genoa in April. According to the poll, it was generally feared that Lenin was putting himself at risk for an assassination attempt.
- A methane explosion killed 24 coal miners employed by the H. C. Frick Coke Company near Brownsville, Pennsylvania.
- An officer of the Royal Irish Constabulary (RIC) was killed in a clash between the RIC and the Irish Republican Army in Killarney as a wave of violence began in Ireland.
- The Jewish communist youth organization Komtsukunft was founded in Poland.
- Born:
  - Stoyanka Mutafova, Bulgarian actress whose career spanned 73 years; in Sofia (d. 2019)
  - Juan Marichal, Spanish-Canarian historian; in Santa Cruz de Tenerife, Canary Islands (d. 2010)

== February 3, 1922 (Friday) ==
- The boundaries between the future republics of Israel, Syria and Lebanon were agreed upon by a French and British committee which recommended to their respective nations the areas for the League of Nations mandates for Mandatory Palestine (under British administration) and the French Mandate for Syria and the Lebanon. British Army Lt. Colonel S. F. Newcombe and French Army Lt. Colonel Paulet, co-chairs of the Border Commission.
- The second homicide trial of Fatty Arbuckle ended in a hung jury.
- The U.S. state of Alabama got its first licensed radio station, WGH in Montgomery.
- Born: Willi Reschke, German Luftwaffe flying ace with 27 aerial victories in World War II; in Mühlow, Brandenburg Province, Weimar Republic (present-day Miłów, Poland) (d. 2017)
- Died:
  - Christiaan de Wet, 67, Boer general, rebel leader and politician, served as President of the Orange Free State from 1902 to 1903 (b. 1854)
  - John Butler Yeats, 82, Irish artist (b. 1839)

== February 4, 1922 (Saturday) ==
- A mob in British India killed 22 policemen by setting fire to the police station in the town of Chauri Chaura and then trapping the men inside. The mob attack came after the police had fired on a crowd of peaceful protesters, killing three civilians. The town, located in the United Provinces (Agra and Oudh) is now in the Indian state of Uttar Pradesh.
- The Ford Motor Company announced its purchase of the financially-ailing Lincoln Motor Company in "the most dramatic receiver's sale in the history of Detroit", as the mass producer of affordable automobiles creates a luxury car division and ends federal bankruptcy court proceedings commenced by Lincoln Motor president Henry M. Leland. According to The New York Times, the eight million dollar acquisition was made at the insistence of Henry Ford's wife, Clara Bryant Ford because of her sympathy and friendship with Mr. and Mrs. Leland.
- At the Conference on the Limitation of Armament, Japan agreed to withdraw troops from Shandong, restore German interests in Qingdao and give the Jinan railway back to China.
- Biddle University, a private university in Charlotte, North Carolina for African American students, was officially renamed Johnson C. Smith University in honor of the late husband of the Biddle's largest benefactor, Jane Berry Smith.

== February 5, 1922 (Sunday) ==
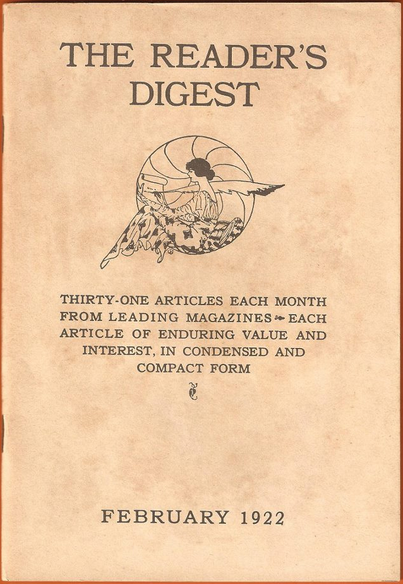

- The first issue of Reader's Digest, dated February 1922, was published by husband-and-wife team DeWitt Wallace and Lila Bell Wallace with the objective of presenting humor and "condensed" versions of longer publications.
- The first round of voting was held for the 15-member Landtag of Liechtenstein. In previous years, the ruling monarch, the Prince, was allowed to appoint three members and the other 12 were elected. The Christlich-Soziale Volkspartei won a majority (8 seats) before the runoff voting, and the ruling Progressive Citizens' Party (FBP) won only one. After the runoff on February 16 for three undecided seats, the CSVP had an 11 to 4 lead, but Prime Minister and FBP leader Josef Ospelt continued as Prime Minister.
- Born: Lafran Pane, Indonesian professor and founder of the Muslim Students' Association; in Padangsidempuan, North Sumatra, Dutch East Indies (d. 1991)
- Died: Frances Bowes-Lyon, 89, British noblewoman, grandmother of Elizabeth Bowes-Lyon, wife of King George VI (b. 1832)

== February 6, 1922 (Monday) ==
- The papal conclave elected the Archbishop of Milan Achille Ratti as the new pope. He took the name Pius XI. At the close of voting the day before, Giovanni Tacci Porcelli had become the front runner after supporters of Rafael Merry del Val of Spain were deadlocked with supporters of Pietro Gasparri.
- The Conference on the Limitation of Armament between the world's major nations ended in Washington, D.C., with the signing of the Washington Naval Treaty and the Nine-Power Treaty on China.
- For the eighth time in less than a year, the cabinet of Portugal was reorganized, with António Maria da Silva becoming prime minister for the second time.
- In Soviet Russia, the Cheka was dissolved and replaced by the State Political Directorate.
- The World Figure Skating Championships ended in Stockholm. Gillis Grafström of Sweden won the men's competition, while Herma Szabo of Austria won the ladies' world title.
- Born:
  - Patrick Macnee, British film and TV actor known for the espionage show The Avengers; as Daniel Patrick Macnee, in Paddington, London (d. 2015)
  - Haskell Wexler, American cinematographer, winner of two Academy Awards, including in 1966 for Who's Afraid of Virginia Woolf?; in Chicago, (d. 2015)
  - Denis Norden, British comedy writer and television presenter; as Denis Moss Cohen, in Hackney, London (d. 2018)
- Died: Chief John Smith, 96-100, Chippewa Native American who was thought to have been 137 years old but whom the Bureau of Indian Affairs concluded to have been no older than 100 based on his recollection of witnessing a spectacular meteor shower as a child in 1833 (b. 1822-1826)

== February 7, 1922 (Tuesday) ==
- El Salvador and Honduras quit the short-lived Federation of Central America.
- Marie Curie was elected to France's Académie Nationale de Médecine, marking the first time that a woman had been elevated to membership into any of the French Academy of Sciences disciplines.
- King George V opened a new session of British Parliament. In his speech from the throne he welcomed the agreements reached in the Washington Naval Conference.
- An attempt by aviator Ray Parer and co-pilot Mark Parer to make the first airplane flight around the perimeter of Australia ended less than four months after it began, when the Parers' Farman F.E.2 airplane crashed on takeoff from Boulder, Western Australia.
- Born:
  - Chew Choo Soot, Malaysian founder of Budokan karate; in Alor Setar, Kedah Sultanate, British Malaya (d. 1997)
  - Hattie Jacques, English comedienne and actress; as Josephine Edwina Jaques, in Sandgate, Kent(d. 1980)
- Died: Sir Alfred Bird, 72, English food manufacturer who built up the Alfred Bird & Sons corporation that had been founded by his father; died from injuries sustained after being struck by a car (b. 1849)

== February 8, 1922 (Wednesday) ==
- The Irish Republican Army kidnapped 42 prominent loyalists and Ulster Special Constabulary constables and held them hostage. On the orders of Free State Chairman Michael Collins, 26 of the men were released by February 15.
- The former U.S. Army transport ship SS Northern Pacific, recently sold to the Pacific Steamship Company for conversion to a liner, caught fire shortly after midnight while at sea near Cape May, New Jersey, as it was being towed from New York to Chester, Pennsylvania. Her crew of 70 was rescued by two freighters and the U.S. Coast Guard cutter Kickapoo, but four U.S. Shipping Board draftsmen on Northern Pacific were lost. The ship capsized and sank 15 hours after the fire had started.
- U.S. President Warren G. Harding acquired the first radio receiver to be installed in the White House.
- Born:
  - Noshir H. Antia, Indian plastic surgeon who pioneered reconstructive surgery and rehabilitation for persons afflicted with leprosy; in Hubli, Mysore princely state (now Karnataka state of India) (d. 2007)
  - Cliff Young, Australian potato farmer and ultramarathon runner who finished first overall to win the inaugural Sydney to Melbourne Ultramarathon in 1983 at the age of 61; as Albert Ernest Clifford Young, in Beech Forest, Victoria (d. 2003)

== February 9, 1922 (Thursday) ==
- The World War Foreign Debts Commission Act, also called the "Allied Debt Refunding Bill", was signed into law by U.S. President Warren G. Harding, providing for a Refunding Commission of five members to decide upon terms of collection back of American loans that had been made to the United Kingdom, France, Italy, and Belgium. The five commissioners were to consist of three of President Harding's cabinet, one U.S. Senator, and one U.S. Representative.
- Born:
  - Kathryn Grayson, American film musical actress and opera soprano; as Zelma Kathryn Elisabeth Hedrick, in Winston-Salem, North Carolina (d. 2010)
  - Jim Laker, English Test cricketer with 46 appearances for the England national team; in Shipley, West Yorkshire (d. 1986)

== February 10, 1922 (Friday) ==
- The value of the Soviet Union's currency, the rouble, dropped further on private currency exchanges by almost 50 percent, falling from the official exchange rate of 280,000 roubles per U.S. dollar to "between 500,000 and 600,000 to the dollar." The value of the Imperial Russian rouble prior to World War I had been 1.94 roubles per U.S. dollar, or equivalent to 51½ cents per ruble. The Soviet response was to issue the "new rouble", worth 10,000 of the old Soviet roubles.
- The science of polarography was invented by Czech chemist Jaroslav Heyrovský with his successful test of a machine of his own design to analyze and measure electrochemical reactions.
- U.S. President Harding appeared in person at the United States Senate with the seven treaties signed at the disarmament conference and urged the Senate to take prompt action on ratifying them. In a speech on the Senate floor, Harding said "If we cannot join in making effective these covenants for peace, and stamp this conference with America's approval, we shall discredit the influence of the Republic, render future efforts futile and unlikely, and write discouragement where today the world is ready to acclaim new hope."
- Irish Republican Army volunteers attacked an Ulster Special Constabulary patrol in Clady, County Tyrone. One constable was shot dead.
- The National Union of Students (NUS), an organization of student governments from universities across the United Kingdom, was founded in London.
- Born:
  - Árpád Göncz, Hungarian writer and politician, served as President of Hungary from 1990 to 2000; in Budapest (d. 2015)
  - J. Hugh Liedtke, oil company executive, co-founder of the Zapata Corporation; in Tulsa, Oklahoma (d. 2003)
  - Mary Stalcup Markward, American FBI informant who infiltrated the Communist Party USA and implicated 242 members; in Fairfax County, Virginia (d. 1972)
- Died:
  - Paul Mounet, 74, French stage and film actor; died of heart disease (b. 1847)
  - Richard H. Rice, 59, American mechanical engineer, known for his improvements to the Corliss steam engine (b. 1863)

== February 11, 1922 (Saturday) ==
- The American Telephone & Telegraph Company (AT&T) announced its plan to create the first nationwide radio broadcasting network in the United States, installing additional telephone cables to its network to transmit its broadcasts to other cities when its WEAF radio station began broadcasting from New York City. The "WEAF Chain" would begin with the linking of WEAF with the Boston radio station WNAC on January 4, 1923, and would have 17 affiliates by 1926 with its renaming as the Broadcasting Company of America (BCA) before selling the network to the largest radio manufacturer, the Radio Corporation of America after six weeks, which in turn would create the NBC Radio Network.
- Representatives of the United States and Japan signed a treaty defining American rights on the South Pacific island group of Yap, allowing the U.S. equal access to the use of cable and radio stations there and on other former German colonial islands mandated to Japan after World War I. U.S. Secretary of State Charles Evans Hughes and Baron Kijūrō Shidehara, Japan's Ambassador to the U.S., signed the agreement at the U.S. Department of State offices. After World War II, the island was administered by the U.S. as part of the Trust Territory of the Pacific Islands and, since 1986, has been one of the constituent states of the Federated States of Micronesia nation.
- There was an armed confrontation in the Irish town of Clones between the Irish Republican Army (IRA) and the Ulster Special Constabulary (USC). A unit of armed Special Constables were traveling from one part of Northern Ireland to another by train, which stopped off at Clones in Southern Ireland. The Provisional Government of Southern Ireland was unaware British forces would be crossing its territory. The IRA called on the Special Constables to surrender for questioning, but one of them shot dead an IRA sergeant. This sparked a firefight in which four Special Constables were killed and several wounded. Five others were captured. The incident threatened to spark off a major confrontation between North and South, and the British government temporarily suspended the withdrawal of British troops from the South.

== February 12, 1922 (Sunday) ==
- The Mahatma Gandhi began a five-day fast as penance for the Chauri Chaura incident and suspended activities of the Non-Cooperation Movement until further notice.
- Pope Pius XI was crowned in Rome, with Cardinal Gaetano Bisleti placing the papal tiara upon Cardinal Achille Ratti.
- Éamon de Valera, who had recently stepped down as Irish leader after his calls for rejection of the Anglo-Irish Treaty had failed in the Dáil Éireann, opened his campaign against the Irish Free State for a fully-independent Irish Republic. At a rally on O'Connell Street in Dublin, thousands of supporters of a republic demonstrated peacefully for an hour while the street was closed to vehicular traffic.
- Born:
  - Sein Win, Burmese journalist and advocate of freedom of the press in Myanmar; in Kyaunggon, Burma (d. 2013)

== February 13, 1922 (Monday) ==
- The Battle of Volochayevka, one of the final engagements in the Russian Civil War, came to an end as Soviet Army General Vasily Blyukher led troops to recapture territory of the nominally-independent Far Eastern Republic from the retreating anti-Bolshevik White Army, led by Major General Viktorin Molchanov of the former Russian Imperial Army.
- Only two of the nine people on the fishing schooner Caldwell H. Colt survived after the boat was wrecked on a reef near the Tortugas Light off of the coast of Texas. Four of the men, who had sailed from Pensacola, Florida and then gotten caught in a gale, remained alive for a week before running out of food and water and were sighted by the liner El Oriente on February 20, but one of the four slipped into the water and drowned before the ship could reach the group, and another died shortly after being rescued.
- Joseph G. "Uncle Joe" Cannon, former Speaker of the U.S. House of Representatives, announced that he would not be a candidate for re-election as Congressman for the 18th District of Illinois in 1922, bringing an end to almost 50 years in Congress. Cannon had first taken office in 1873 and had spent all but four years in the House, serving from 1873 to 1891, 1893 to 1913 and since 1915, and was 85 years old at the time of his announcement.
- Born: Gordon Tullock, American economist known for the development of public choice theory; in Rockford, Illinois (d. 2014)

== February 14, 1922 (Tuesday) ==
- The first commercial radio station in Britain, 2MT, began regular broadcasting, consisting of 30 minutes on Tuesday evenings from 8:00 pm to 8:30 pm. "Two Emma Toc" transmitted its signal from the village of Writtle near Chelmsford, Essex in England on a frequency of 428 kHz.
- Greek soldiers retreating from Smyrna during the Greco-Turkish War in Turkey carried out a massacre of 60 Turkish residents of the village of Karatepe. According to witnesses, the victims sought refuge in the village mosque, which the soldiers set on fire. The people who escaped to temporary survival were shot.
- The Toronto radio station CFCA carried the first broadcast of a National Hockey League game, relaying the highlights of a match between the Toronto St. Pats and the Ottawa Senators.
- Died: Heikki Ritavuori, 41, Finnish lawyer and politician, served as Minister of the Interior in charge of law enforcement; shot to death in his home by an assassin (b. 1880)

== February 15, 1922 (Wednesday) ==
- The Permanent Court of International Justice officially began operations in The Hague.
- German Chancellor Joseph Wirth survived a confidence vote, 220 to 185, in the 459-member German Reichstag, after most of the 83 members of the Independent Social Democratic Party of Germany (USPD), who had opposed his policies, had abstained from voting. Wirth had been attacked by both the left and right over his handling of the recent railway strike.
- Chittaranjan Das, President-elect of the Indian National Congress, was sentenced to six months imprisonment after having been arrested in December on charges of being manager of an unlawful association.
- Edward, Prince of Wales and Crown Prince of the United Kingdom, received an enthusiastic welcome in Delhi upon his arrival in British India.
- The Satversme, the first constitution of Latvia, was adopted by an elected 150-member constitutional assembly. Latvia's independence would come to an end on August 5, 1940, with its annexation as the Latvian Soviet Socialist Republic into the Soviet Union. On May 4, 1990, the Supreme Soviet of Latvia, the legislature for the Latvian SSR would vote to declare the Soviet occupation illegal and to re-establish the authority of the 1922 constitution.
- Born:
  - John B. Anderson, American lawyer and politician, U.S. Congressman for Illinois, ran as a third party candidate for President in 1980; in Rockford, Illinois (d. 2017)
  - Doris Kuhlmann-Wilsdorf, German-born American metallurgist and specialist in tribology for development of efficient electrical conduction; in Bremen, Weimar Republic (d. 2010)
- Died:
  - Richard Beddows, 78, English-born U.S. soldier and Medal of Honor recipient, fought for the 34th New York Battery in the American Civil War (b. 1843)
  - James Martin Peebles, 99, American physician, author and spiritualist whose 1884 book How to Live a Century and Grow Old Gracefully had been a nationwide best-seller (b. 1822)

== February 16, 1922 (Thursday) ==
- The U.S. Department of War announced that more than half of the remaining 6,000 U.S. Army occupation forces remaining in Germany were being withdrawn, beginning the second phase of the withdrawal of U.S. troops. In October, the first 8,000 had been redeployed to the U.S., and the orders affected 203 officers and 3,000 enlisted men in the U.S. Fifth Infantry and others stationed in Koblenz. A force of 169 officers and 2,717 would be the remaining U.S. force in Germany.
- Czechoslovakia defeated Sweden, 3 to 2, to win the European Ice Hockey Championship.
- Born:
  - Heinz-Wolfgang Schnaufer, German Luftwaffe flying ace with 121 aerial victories, most of them at nighttime against British bomber airplanes; in Calw, Weimar Republic (d. 1950, killed in auto accident)
  - Saul Robbins, American toy maker and co-founder of the Remco Toy Company; in Brooklyn, New York (d. 2010)
  - Wilson D. Watson, U.S. Marine private and Medal of Honor recipient for killing more than 90 enemy soldiers during fighting in Iwo Jima on February 26 and 27, 1945; in Tuscumbia, Alabama (d. 1994)
- Died:
  - Newton Knight, 92, American farmer, soldier, and Southern Unionist, led a group of Confederate States Army deserters to resist the Confederacy and, in 1863, declared Jones County, Mississippi to be the "Free State of Jones," aligning it with the United States (b. 1829)
  - John Horton Slaughter, 80, American lawman, cowboy and rancher (b. 1841)

== February 17, 1922 (Friday) ==
- Italy's Prime Minister Ivanoe Bonomi lost a vote of confidence by a large margin in the Italian Chamber of Deputies, with only 107 favoring his government to continue, and 209 opposing it.
- The government of Japan barred birth control advocate Margaret Sanger from entry into that nation. Mrs. Sanger had been scheduled to depart from San Francisco on February 21 to sail on the passenger steamer Taiyo Maru to begin a lecture tour.
- A mock trial of André Breton was conducted in a Paris café after he had published a polemic against Tristan Tzara, calling him a "publicity mongering imposter," that had split the Dada movement. Erik Satie served as "judge," and 100 other avant-gardists including Pablo Picasso and Jean Cocteau were in attendance. Breton seemed to be unprepared for the viciousness of the attacks brought against him, and the trial came to mark the unofficial end of Dadism.
- Boxing promoter and sports promoter George "Tex" Rickard was arrested on charges of sexual assault and abduction, for which he was found not guilty or for which charges were dismissed.
- Born:
  - Enrico Banducci, American theatrical entrepreneur and producer impresario who launched careers for numerous singers and comedians, including Barbra Streisand and Lenny Bruce; as Harry C. Banducci, in Bakersfield, California (d. 2007)
  - Mary Talbot, British naval officer, Director of the Women's Royal Naval Service who worked to modernize the WRNS during her tenure from 1973 to 1976 (d. 2012)
  - Valentino Mazzia, American anesthesiologist and medical expert who pioneered the specialty of forensic anesthesiology; in New York City (d. 1999)
  - Chen Jiayong, Chinese metallurgist and pioneer in the development of extractive hydrometallurgy; in Jintang, Sichuan Province, Republic of China (d. 2019)
  - Howard Malmstadt, American chemist and innovator of electronic measurement of chemical processes; in Marinette, Wisconsin (d. 2003)
  - W. B. Makuloluwa, Sri Lankan folk music composer; as William Bandara Makuloluwa, in Idamegama village Harispattuwa, Kandy, British Ceylon (d. 1984)
- Died:
  - Ali Musliyar, 60, Indian Muslim rebel and a leader of the Malabar rebellion; executed by hanging at a prison in Coimbatore (b. 1862)
  - Albert Shelton, 46, American physician and Christian missionary to Tibet; died a day after being ambushed by bandits near Batang, Sichuan province (b. 1875)

== February 18, 1922 (Saturday) ==
- The Capper–Volstead Act was signed into law by U.S. President Harding and allowed agricultural cooperatives (or "farmers co-ops") to be formed in the United States by exempting them from antitrust laws.
- Kenesaw Mountain Landis resigned as a U.S. federal judge, explaining he did not have enough time to hold the position while serving as Commissioner of Baseball and aiding the American Legion.
- The first of six installments of The Chessmen of Mars, the fifth of the Edgar Rice Burroughs series of Barsoom science fiction and fantasy novels with a setting on the planet Mars, was printed in Argosy All-Story Weekly, running until March 25. In November, the complete novel would be published. The installment introduced Burroughs's made up board game of "jetan," a Martian version of chess with 100 squares and 20 pieces on each side, played by the chessmen for wagering purposes. Burroughs added an appendix with rules in the novel after fans began writing him to express their interest, starting with a letter in August from an inmate of Leavenworth Prison.
- WOK, the first licensed radio station in the state of Arkansas, went on the air in Pine Bluff.
- Iowa's first radio station, WOC out of Davenport, went on the air.
- Seven theaters in Washington, D.C., were ordered closed following a safety inquiry conducted after the Knickerbocker Theatre tragedy.
- Born:
  - Helen Gurley Brown, American author and editor, known for the 1962 bestseller Sex and the Single Girl and for re-focusing Cosmopolitan magazine into a high-circulation monthly for modern career-women; as Helen Marie Gurley, in Green Forest, Arkansas (d. 2012)
  - Constance "Connie" Wisniewski, American baseball pitcher for the All-American Girls Professional Baseball League, winner of AAGPBL Player of the Year Award in 1945; in Detroit (d. 1995)
  - Mikhail Savitsky, Belarusian painter; in Zvenyachi, Byelorussian SSR, Soviet Union (d. 2010)

== February 19, 1922 (Sunday) ==
- New York's WJZ became the first radio station to broadcast a live show. Ed Wynn came in and performed his "Perfect Fool" character, which was having a successful run on Broadway at the time, but he found himself freezing up in front of the microphone without the benefit of a live audience off of which to set his timing.

== February 20, 1922 (Monday) ==
- The George Gershwin songs, Someone and Tra-la-la, were performed for the first time, as part of the Broadway show For Goodness Sake.

== February 21, 1922 (Tuesday) ==
- The American airship Roma crashed in Norfolk, Virginia, killing 34 people, all but five of whom were officers and enlisted men of the U.S. Army Air Service. The dirigible, filled with hydrogen gas that had been used to replace its relatively safe buoyant of helium, began a rapid descent after its pitch control broke. With no control of their vertical movement, the crew had the misfortune of striking high tension electrical wires, which caused the hydrogen to ignite into flame. Only 11 people on board survived the accident. The Roma had departed Langley Field at 1:30 in the afternoon for a test flight of its newly-installed Liberty L-12 engines and was approaching Hampton Roads Naval Base when it began tilting forward.
- The Ernst Lubitsch-directed German epic historical film The Loves of Pharaoh premiered in New York.
- Born: Sir Jack Cater, served as Chief Secretary of Hong Kong from 1978 to 1981; in London (d. 2006)

== February 22, 1922 (Wednesday) ==
- A presidential election was held to approve General José María Orellana, who had overthrown the government of Guatemala in a coup d'etat on December 5, as President of Guatemala. In order to provide a token choice for voters, the Guatemalan Army placed General Jorge Ubico, who was one of Orellana's fellow coup leaders, on the ballot and did not allow any other candidates. Orellana received a reported 95% of the vote.
- The pioneering New York City radio station WOR began regular broadcasting, starting a mix of music and news transmitted from the roof of Bamberger's Department Store in Newark, New Jersey. The first record played on the station was "April Showers", sung by Al Jolson.
- The Pro-Treaty and Anti-Treaty factions of Sinn Féin signed a truce regarding cooperation with the Irish Free State government and agreed to revisit the issue of the ratification in three months.
- Born:
  - Natalya Kachuevskaya, Soviet medic for the Red Army during World War II, posthumously awarded the title Hero of the Russian Federation; as Natalya Spirova, in Petrograd, Russian SFSR, Soviet Union (present-day Saint Petersburg, Russia) (d. 1942)
  - Virtue Hampton Whitted, African American jazz singer, member of The Hampton Sisters quartet; as Virtue Hampton, in Middletown, Ohio (d. 2007)

== February 23, 1922 (Thursday) ==
- The "Removal of Church Valuables for the Relief of the Starving" Decree was signed into law by Vladimir Lenin after having been issued on February 9 by Russia's All-Russian Central Executive Committee. The decree, issued by the Soviet Communist Party, had the objective of paying for famine relief by the confiscation of religious icons containing jewelry, gold, silver or other precious minerals for processing and resale. Notice of the intended decree, had been published in the Soviet government newspaper Izvestia on February 11. The decree was finally published in by the government on February 26, to take effect on March 26 and ordering police agencies to take "the riches of churches of all denominations in gold, silver and jewels whose requisition cannot really injure the interests of the cult itself and hand them over to the official financial bodies for the benefit of the famine.
- The city of San Diego, California, with a population of around 75,000 people, was designated the site of U.S. Destroyer Base, San Diego by General Order 78, issued by U.S. Secretary of the Navy Theodore Roosevelt Jr., after the 11th Naval District had initially considered establishing the headquarters of the U.S. Navy Pacific Fleet at San Pedro near Los Angeles. The growth of the metropolitan area of San Diego County grew from 113,000 in 1920 to 1.3 million by 1970, and to 3.3 million a century after the order had been issued.
- Japan's Parliament, the all-male National Diet, rejected a proposal for universal suffrage, with only 159 in favor and 288 against extending voting rights to women. Demonstrations outside of the parliament were peaceful during the day, but at 7:00 in the evening, when word of the result of the vote was revealed, about 1,000 people tried to break through police lines and rioting began. The members of the Diet voted to adjourn at 7:45 and were escorted under heavy police guard through the angry crowd.
- Born:
  - James L. Holloway III, U.S. Navy admiral and naval aviator, served as Chief of Naval Operations from 1974 to 1978; in Charleston, South Carolina (d. 2019)
  - Karl-Heinz Meltzer, German Luftwaffe flying ace with 74 aerial victories in World War II; in Hamburg, Weimar Republic (d. 1943, killed in action)
- Died: John Joseph Jolly Kyle, 84, Argentine chemist (b. 1838)

== February 24, 1922 (Friday) ==
- Luigi Facta, a member of the Italian Chamber of Deputies and former Minister of Justice and Minister of Finance, met with King Victor Emmanuel III and agreed to form a new Cabinet to replace Ivanoe Bonomi as Prime Minister of Italy.
- Born:
  - Richard Hamilton, British pop art and collage artist; in Pimlico, London (d. 2011)
  - Steven Hill, American television actor known for Law & Order; as Solomon Krakovsky, in Seattle (d. 2016)
  - Esperanza Magaz, Cuban telenovela actress; as Lidia Esperanza Magaz Jaime, in Havana(d. 2013)
- Died: Viscount Harcourt, 59, British politician, served as Secretary of State for the Colonies from 1910 to 1915; died from an accidental overdose of the sleeping aid Bromidia (b. 1863)

== February 25, 1922 (Saturday) ==
- The United States Chamber of Commerce announced the creation of the General Air Service Corporation, a regulated American airline using dirigibles for scheduled flights.
- The Carnival of the Animals, a musical suite written by French classical composer Camille Saint-Saëns in 1886, was given its first public performance, two months after his death and 36 years after he had penned it. The composition, performed by the Concerts Colonne orchestra in Paris, conducted by Gabriel Pierné, was enthusiastically received by the audience and praised by critics. Ironically, Saint-Saëns had forbidden the performance, during his lifetime, of what would become his best-known composition, because he worried that it would ruin his reputation.
- Died:
  - Henri Désiré Landru, 52, French serial killer who had murdered at least ten women and a teenage boy; beheaded by the guillotine at the grounds of the Prison Saint-Pierre in Versailles (b. 1869)
  - Samuel A. Derieux, 40-41, American short story writer and three-time O. Henry Award winner; died from a ruptured appendix (b. 1881)

== February 26, 1922 (Sunday) ==
- A 20-year military alliance between the United Kingdom and France was agreed upon by British prime minister David Lloyd George and French Premier Raymond Poincaré after two days of meetings in Boulogne, to be signed in London advance of the April 10 economic conference in Genoa. "If it means anything," a reporter for The New York Times wrote, "it must mean an end of the tiresome quarrels between England and France which have cursed Europe since Nov. 11, 1918." Besides agreeing to go to war if Germany made an unprovoked attack against either nation, the pact between the UK and France also meant "that England and France promise to protect Poland against attack by Germany—a considerable victory gained by France for her protégé." The pledge to Poland, in effect until the year 1942, would be tested 17 years later on September 1, 1939, when the UK and France would declare war on Germany after the latter's invasion of Poland. The two premiers had met the day before to discuss the conference.
- Born:
  - Bill Johnston, Australian cricketer, captain of the 1948 Australian Test cricket team; in Beeac, Victoria (d. 2007)
  - William Baumol, American economist and developer of entrepreneurship theory; in New York City (d. 2014)
  - Margaret Leighton, English film and television actress; in Barnt Green, Worcestershire, (d. 1976)
  - Karl Aage Præst, Danish footballer and left wing on national team; in Copenhagen (d. 2011)
  - Bunny Briggs, African American tap dancer, inducted in the American Tap Dancing Hall of Fame in 2006; as Bernard Briggs, in Harlem, New York City (d. 2014)
  - Nestor Leynes, Filipino artist who pioneered the "magic realism" movement; in Santa Cruz (d. 2016)

== February 27, 1922 (Monday) ==
- The first National Radio Conference was opened in Washington, D.C., by Commerce Secretary Herbert Hoover.
- The U.S. Supreme Court decided the companion cases of Fairchild v. Hughes and Leser v. Garnett, both of which rejected challenges by citizens to the Nineteenth Amendment to the U.S. Constitution, extending the right to vote to women. Oscar Leser contended that the 19th Amendment didn't apply to the U.S. state of Maryland because the Maryland State Constitution specifically limited the right to vote to men, and the Maryland General Assembly had voted against ratifying the 19th Amendment or amending the Maryland constitution. Charles S. Fairchild had filed suit to compel the withdrawal of the proclamation of the amendment's effect, and the Supreme Court determined that a citizen had no standing to maintain a cause of action.

== February 28, 1922 (Tuesday) ==
Flag of the Sultanate of Egypt

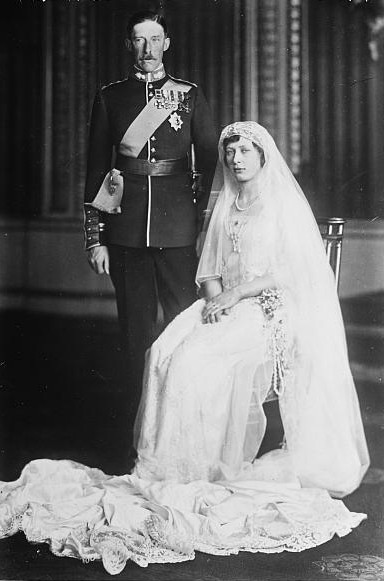
Princess Mary and Viscount Lascelles

- Britain ended its protectorate over Egypt by a unilateral declaration that declared de jure Egyptian sovereignty, but reserved British authority over Egypt's foreign and military affairs. The announcement stated that martial law, enforced by the British Army, would continue until the Egyptian government passed an act of indemnity to protect British interests, and that Britain would reserve its discretion in matters involving "security of British empire communications," "defence of Egypt against all foreign aggression and interference," protection of minorities and of foreign interests in Egypt, and protection of British interests in the Sudan. Sultan Fuad I, who had co-operated with British authorities during protectorate rule, would declare himself King of Egypt on March 15.
- A lavish royal wedding was conducted in Britain's Westminster Abbey for Princess Mary, the only daughter of King George V, as she married Henry Lascelles, 6th Earl of Harewood.
- Patriarch Tikhon of Moscow, leader of the Russian Orthodox Church, filed an appeal against the "Removal of Church Valuables for the Relief of the Starving" Decree in an attempt to delay enforcement of the order against the 80,000 orthodox churches in the Russian SFSR.
- Born: Jan H van der Merwe, South African mathematician and physicist, pioneer in the field of epitaxy, co-developer of the Frank–Van der Merwe crystal growth model; as Johannes Hendrik van der Merwe, in Humpata, Portuguese West Africa (now Angola) (d. 2016)
- Died: Ella O'Neill, 64, mother of Eugene O'Neill and wife of James O'Neill; died of a brain tumor (b. 1857)
