= January 1922 =

Month of 1922

The following events occurred in January 1922:

<<	January 1922					>>
Su	Mo	Tu	We	Th	Fr	Sa
1	2	3	4	5	6	7
8	9	10	11	12	13	14
15	16	17	18	19	20	21
22	23	24	25	26	27	28
29	30	31

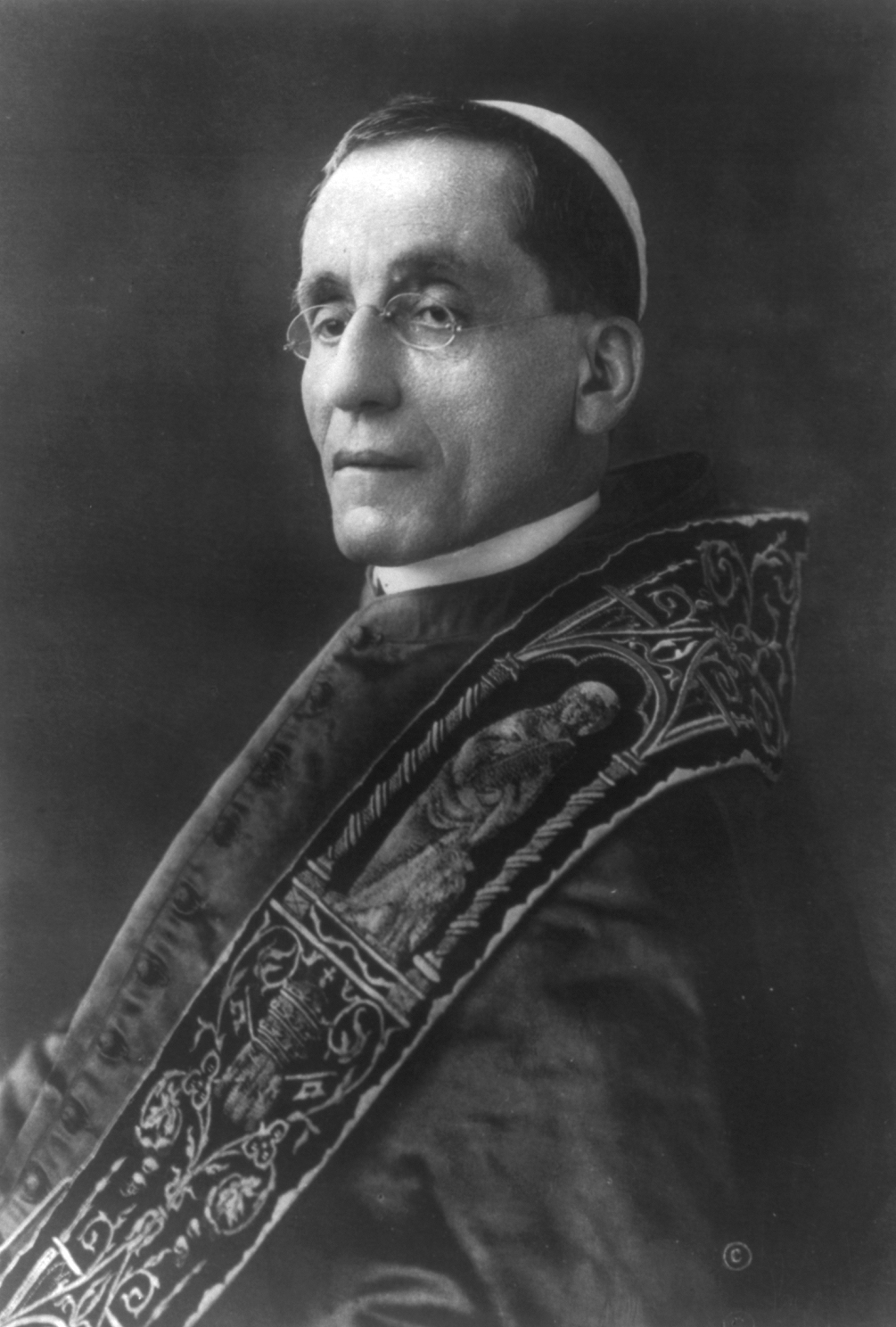
January 22, 1922: Benedict XV, Roman Catholic Pope since 1914, dies at the age of 67

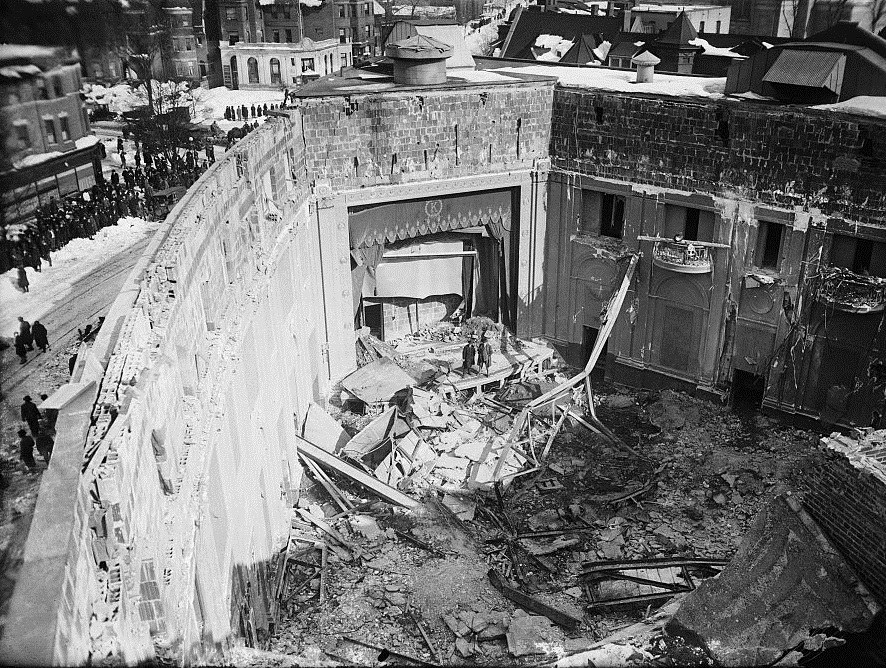
January 28, 1922: Collapse of the Knickerbocker movie theater in Washington kills 96 people

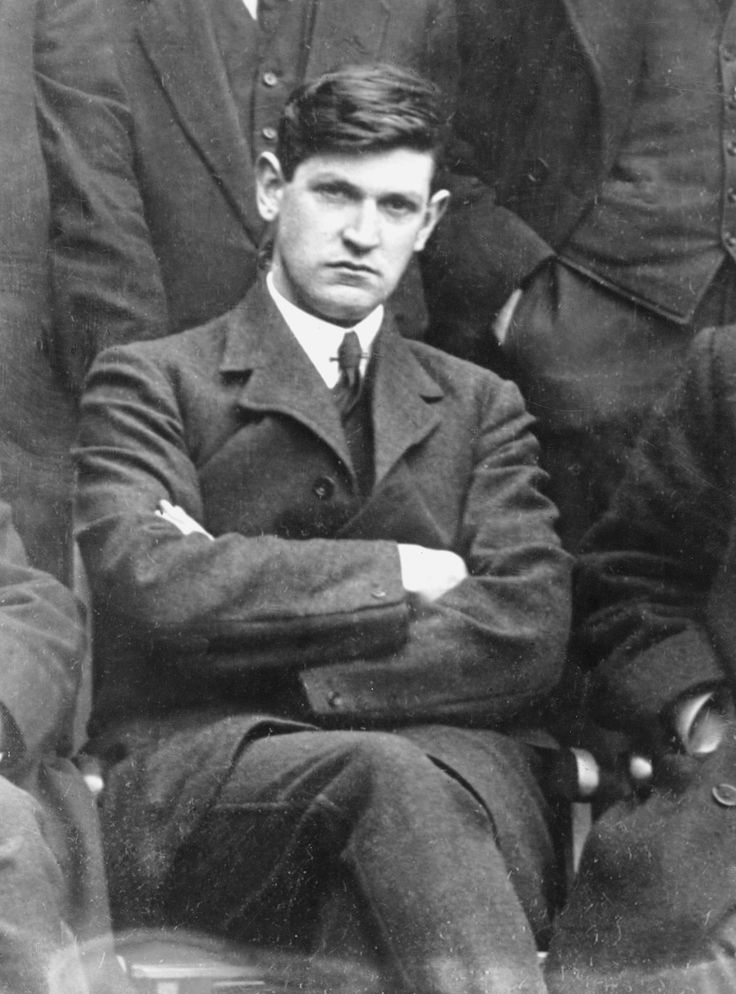
January 14, 1922: Michael Collins becomes the first Chairman of the Irish Free State in Dublin

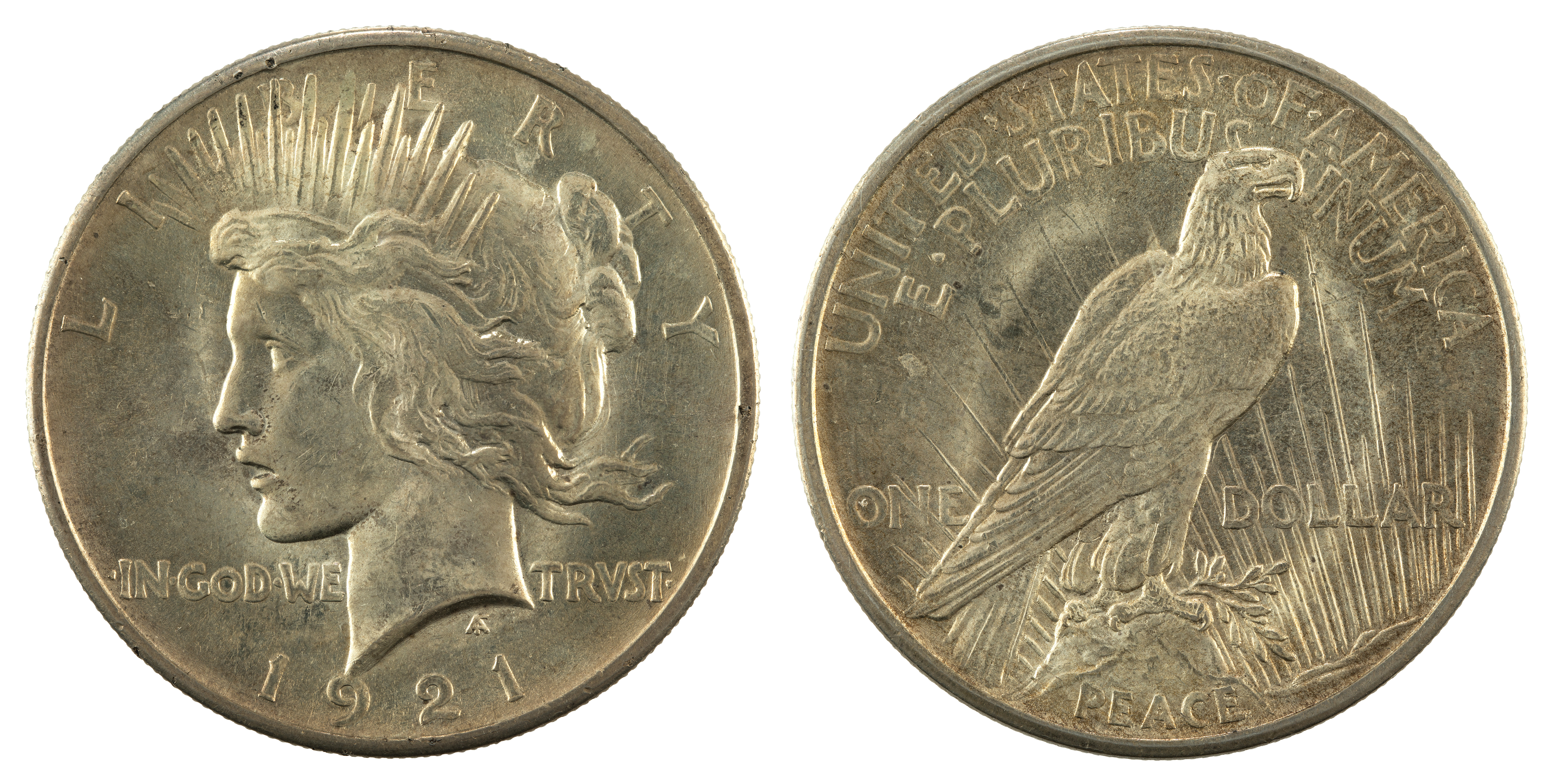
January 3, 1922: New "Peace Dollar" put into circulation in the U.S.

== January 1, 1922 (Sunday) ==
- A delegation of the Far Eastern Republic in Washington, D.C. revealed what it claimed to be secret documents revealing a military alliance between France and Japan, seeking to secure Japanese domination of Siberia in exchange for stabilization of French interests in Russia. France and Japan both denounced the documents as forgeries.
- Belgium officially instituted bilingualism, with documents to be printed in both French and Dutch.
- Born: Ernest "Fritz" Hollings, American politician, U.S. Senator for South Carolina from 1966 to 2005; in Charleston, South Carolina (d. 2019)
- Died: István Kühár, 34, Slovene Roman Catholic priest, writer, and politician (b. 1887)

== January 2, 1922 (Monday) ==
- In the Rose Bowl, two of college football's undefeated and untied teams, the Washington & Jefferson Presidents (10-0-0) and the California Golden Bears (9-0-0) played to a 0 to 0 tie in Pasadena, California. The Official NCAA Division I Football Records Book lists both teams (along with three others) as the unofficial champion of the 1921 college football season.
- In the other major postseason college game, the once-beaten (4-1-2) Aggies of Texas A&M defeated the previously undefeated and untied (10-0-0) Praying Colonels of Centre College, 22 to 14, at Dallas, Texas. The game was also notable for the introduction of the "12th Man" tradition of Texas A&M, when a student spectator is called to be ready to enter the game.
- The Soviet government published statistical data showing that 1,766,118 people had been executed since the October Revolution.
- The value of the German mark fell to 1/32,000th of the British pound or 133rd of a British penny. With an exchange rate of $4.86 to the British pound, the U.S. dollar was worth 6,600 German marks, and American banks refused to accept the mark for payment of debts.
- Died: Suddha Dibyaratana, 44, Princess of Rattanakosin, and member of Thai royalty as the daughter of King Chulalongkorn; died of tuberculosis (b. 1877)

== January 3, 1922 (Tuesday) ==
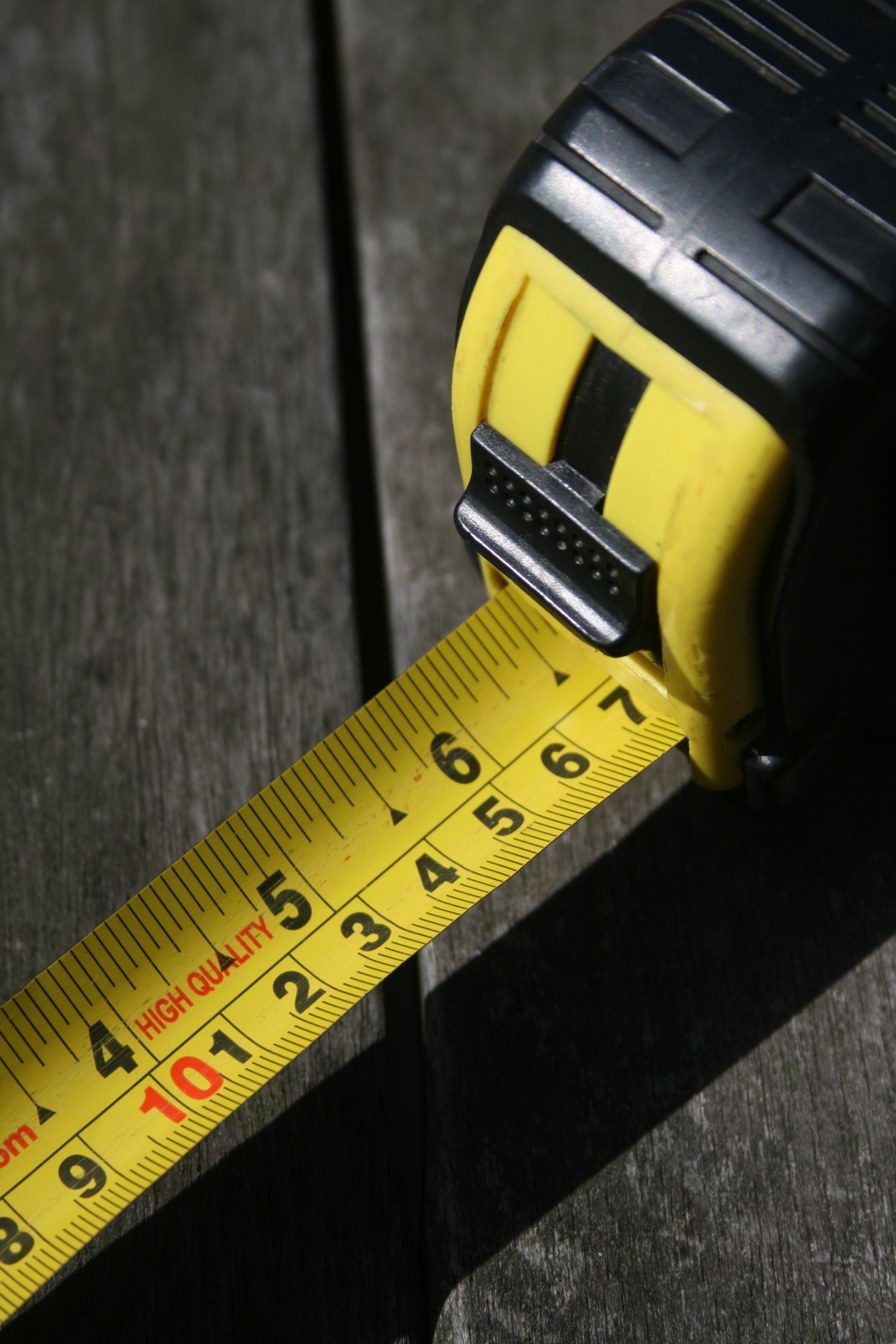
An example of the patented "concave-convex" steel tape measure

- American inventor Hiram A. Farrand was granted U.S. Patent #1,402,589 for his creation of the "concave-convex" steel tape, flexible and slightly curved for ease of extension and retraction, setting the standard now used for the pocket tape measure. The "Farrand Rapid Rule" design, marketed in the 1920s by the Brown Company, set the standard still used in metallic tape measures.
- The "Peace dollar", the new design for the American silver dollar by the United States Mint, was put into circulation six days after the striking of the first coins (dated 1921) on December 28.
- In compliance with the Treaty of Ankara, signed on October 20, France began the withdrawal of its occupation forces from Turkey, starting with the departure of French Army troops in the Mersin Province.
- Romania and Latvia established diplomatic relations.
- Born: Sunwoo Hwi, South Korean novelist; in Chongju, Korea (present-day North Korea) (d. 1986)

== January 4, 1922 (Wednesday) ==
- In India, the massive 10.5 feet (3.2 m) tall Asian Elephant Guruvayur Keshavan was donated to the Guruvayur Temple by royal family of Nilambur. Keshavan, about 10-years old at the time of his capture, would serve at the temple for almost 55 years until his death on December 2, 1976.
- Representatives of Belgium, France and Great Britain met at Cannes for a conference on Germany's inability to make reparations payments.
- Born: Tian Jiaying, Chinese teacher, served as the personal secretary for Mao Zedong from 1948 until his suicide at the beginning of the Cultural Revolution; in Chengdu, Sichuan, Republic of China (d. 1966, suicide)

== January 5, 1922 (Thursday) ==
- London Times correspondent A.B. Kay was kidnapped by armed members of the Irish Republican Army. Kay had been having lunch in a pub across from the Dáil Éireann when three men with revolvers burst in and abducted him, angry over a story he'd written regarding public opinion in Cork over the Anglo-Irish Treaty. Kay was released that same night.
- The Washington Naval Conference adopted a declaration outlawing submarine warfare against merchant ships.
- Occupational troops of the French Army the French Armenian Legion withdrew their occupational forces from the Turkish city of Adana after three years of enforcement against further actions against the Turkish Armenian minority.
- Died:
  - Ernest Shackleton, 47, Anglo-Irish polar explorer who led 3 British expeditions to the Antarctic; died from a heart attack caused by the blockage of his coronary artery by atheroma plaque (b. 1874)
  - Alfred Dolge, 73, German-born American inventor, industrialist and reformer (b. 1848)

== January 6, 1922 (Friday) ==
- Éamon de Valera offered his resignation as President of the Irish Republic, saying that he "could not carry on until I know if I have the support of this Dáil ... I appeal to this House to re-elect me, give me a vote of confidence so that I can stand on the rock of an independent Irish republic. If you want this treaty you can elect someone else."
- Construction began on the Delaware River Bridge (now the Benjamin Franklin Bridge) between Philadelphia and Camden, New Jersey, more than a century after the first discussions to link the U.S. states of Pennsylvania and New Jersey by something other than the existing ferry services. Pennsylvania Governor William C. Sproul and New Jersey Governor Edward I. Edwards both participated in the groundbreaking ceremony, and the bridge would open to traffic on July 1, 1926.

== January 7, 1922 (Saturday) ==
- Following weeks of debate, the Dáil Éireann voted 64 to 57 to approve the Anglo-Irish Treaty.

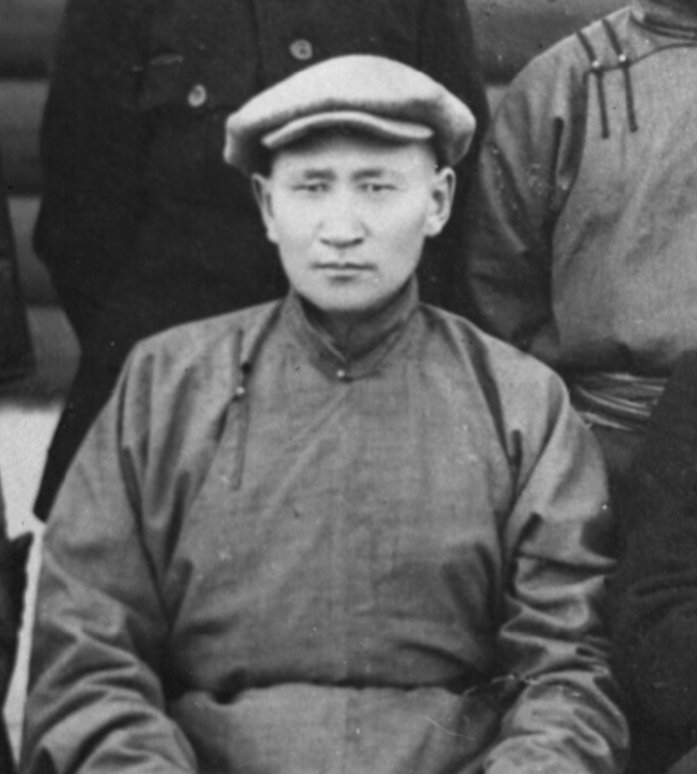
Dogsomyn Bodoo

- Dogsomyn Bodoo, the first Prime Minister of Mongolia since the nation's independence in April and a founder of the Mongolian People's Revolutionary Party, resigned after six months after having become unpopular from his campaign to reform Mongolian traditions to fit Soviet Union norms, including the banning of long hair and women's jewelry. After forcing Bodoo's resignation, new Premier Sonomyn Damdinbazar accused him and other government ministers of corruption and treason, and had him arrested. Bodoo would be executed on August 31.
- U.S. Representative Alanson B. Houghton was appointed as the new U.S. Ambassador to Germany.
- The Washington Naval Conference agreed to outlaw the use of poison gas in warfare.
- Born:
  - Alvin Dark, American professional baseball player and manager; in Comanche, Oklahoma (d. 2014)
  - Jean-Pierre Rampal, French flautist; in Marseille (d. 2000)
- Died: Jørg Tofte Jebsen, 33, Norwegian theoretical physicist; died from an undisclosed illness (b. 1888)

== January 8, 1922 (Sunday) ==
- A general election was held in the Republic of Central Lithuania. A majority of the inhabitants voted to remain part of Poland, but the Lithuanian government refused to recognize the vote.
- Éamon de Valera said that the Republic of Ireland still existed and that the previous day's resolution was "not ratification of that treaty and not a legal act. That will not be affected until the Irish people have disestablished the republic which they have set up by their own will."
- The Socialist Youth League of Norway was founded.
- Born: Jan Nieuwenhuys, Dutch painter; as Johannes Theodorus Nieuwenhuijs, in Amsterdam (d. 1986)
- Died: Charles Young, United States Army officer and National Park Service superintendent and the first Black soldier to achieve the rank of colonel in the U.S. Army; died of a kidney infection (b. 1864)

== January 9, 1922 (Monday) ==
- By a margin of only two votes, Éamon de Valera was narrowly defeated for re-election as President of the Dáil Éireann, losing 60 to 58. After the vote was counted everyone in the assembly rose and cheered for him. "The re-election of de Valera would have been equivalent to rescinding of the treaty" creating the Irish Free State and ratified only two days earlier, by creating two governments for southern Ireland, The New York Times wrote; Three members of the Dáil— De Valera himself, an unidentified MP and Liam de Róiste— abstained from voting. De Róiste reportedly refused to vote, commenting that the motion was "calculated to throw the country into fratricidal strife." Arthur Griffith commented, after voting against the motion, "I want to say that this is not a vote taken against President De Valera. It is a vote to damn the treaty, and I want to say now there is no man I have met in my life whom I more respect and love."
- The Danish parliament approved 1.5 million kroner (roughly US$560,000) for relief against the Russian famine.
- The first elections were held for the newly established Supreme Muslim Council, a four-member body created to oversee religious courts and finances in British Palestine, and the Hajj Amin al-Husseini of Jerusalem was selected as the council's first leader. The other persons picked by the electoral college were Muhammad Murad, mufti of Haifa; 'Abd al-Latif Salah of Nablus; and Abdullah Dajani of Jaffa.
- The 1915 Leonid Andreyev play Tot, kto polučájet poščóčiny ("Anyone, who gets a slap in the face"), translated from the Russian language by Gregory Zilboorg, received its first English language performance on Broadway. Adapted as He Who Gets Slapped, and starring actor Richard Bennett in the title role, the play had a successful run of 308 performances.
- Born:
  - Ahmed Sékou Touré, Guinean political leade, served as President of Guinea from 1958 to 1984; in Faranah, French Guinea (d. 1984)
  - Har Gobind Khorana, Indian-American biochemist; in Raipur, Punjab, British India (present-day Punjab, Pakistan) (d. 2011)
  - John H. Kennell, American pediatrician and researcher known for his work in maternal-infant bonding; in Reading, Pennsylvania (d. 2013)
- Died: Maria Louise Baldwin, 65, American educator and the first Black principal of a predominantly white school in the United States; died of heart disease (b. 1856)

== January 10, 1922 (Tuesday) ==
- Arthur Griffith was elected President of Dáil Éireann by the unanimous vote of all 64 deputies remaining after all 54 of Éamon de Valera's supporters walked out. The assembly then adjourned until February 14 to give his new government time to begin the organization of what would become the Irish Free State.
- The Sejm in Poland approved a bill introducing two-year compulsory military service.
- Germany inaugurated a new wireless telegraphy service, called "Blitzfunk" (literally "lightning spark") between Berlin and Hamburg, with the objective of higher priority in speedy delivery of the message. A message brought to the Berlin main office at 9:00 in the morning was transmitted to Hamburg at 9:03, where it was then transcribed and then "telephoned to the addressee at 9:10" before delivery of the telegram.
- Born:
  - Soedjatmoko, Indonesian diplomat, served as Ambassador to the United States and representative of Indonesia at the United Nations; as Soedjatmoko Mangoendiningrat, in Sawahlunto, West Sumatra, Dutch East Indies (present-day Indonesia) (d. 1989)
  - Terence Kilmartin, Irish-born literary translator and newspaper editor for The Observer; in the Irish Free State (d. 1991)
- Died:
  - Ōkuma Shigenobu, 83, Japanese statesman, served as Prime Minister of Japan from 1914 to 1916 (b. 1838)
  - Frank Tudor, 55, Australian politician, Australian Labor Party chairman and Leader of the Opposition from 1917 until his death; died of heart disease (b. 1866)
  - Hans Kronold, 49, Polish-born American cellist, first cello player to have an audio recording made of his work (b. 1872)

== January 11, 1922 (Wednesday) ==
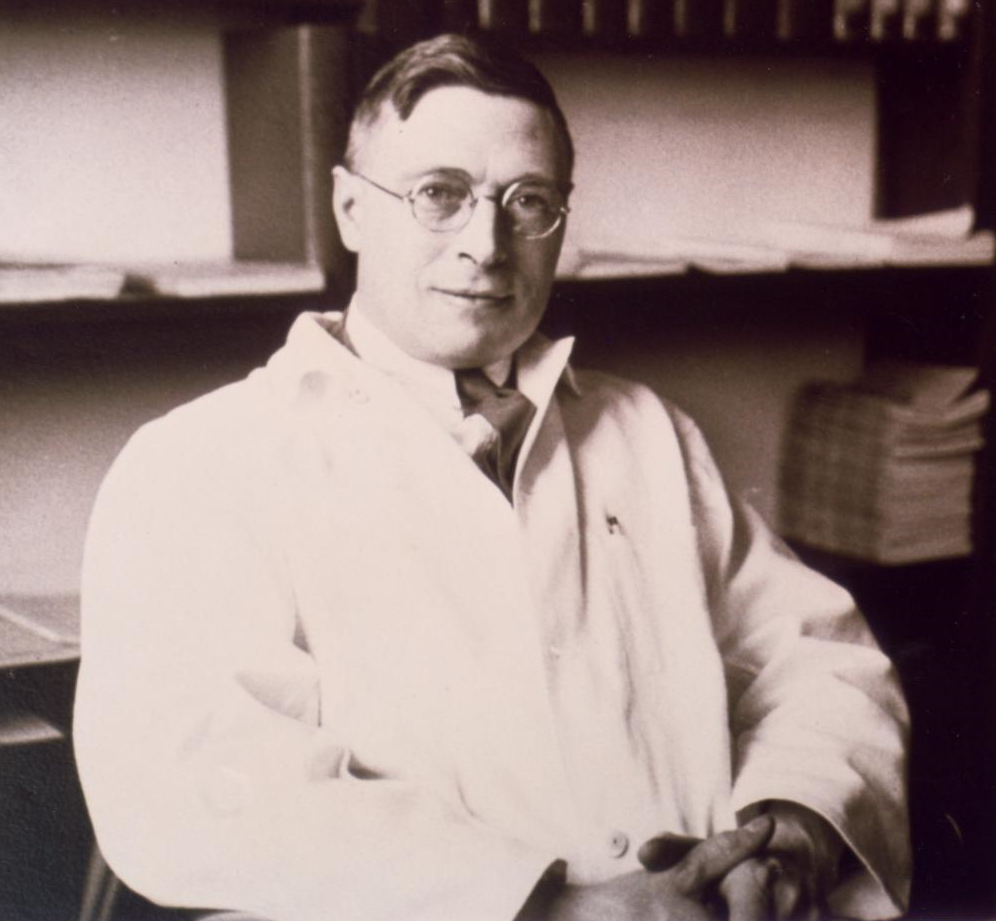
Dr. James Collip

- At Toronto General Hospital, 14-year old Leonard Thompson became the first human to receive an injection of insulin as a treatment for diabetes, administered by Dr. James Collip. Thompson developed an allergic reaction to the injection. Additional work was done to refine the treatment and a second dose given on January 23.
- The second trial of Fatty Arbuckle began in San Francisco.
- The drama film Foolish Wives, written and directed by Erich von Stroheim, premiered at the Central Theatre in New York City.

== January 12, 1922 (Thursday) ==
- The Seamen's strike of 1922 began at the ports of Hong Kong and in Canton as Chinese workers of the Seamen's Union walked off their jobs when a demand for a salary increase was turned down by the maritime companies. The strike would last for 52 days, ending on March 5 after the companies agreed to raise wages by 15% with a cap at 30%.
- The British government announced an amnesty for all Irish political prisoners. Sir Winston Churchill, then the Secretary of State for the Colonies, wrote the proclamation declaring that "The King has been pleased, at the moment when the Provisional Irish Government is due to take effect, to grant general amnesty with respect to all offences committed in Ireland from political motives prior to the operation of the truce, July 11, last. The release of the prisoners to which amnesty applies may begin forthwith. It is the King's confident hope that this act of oblivion will aid in powerfully establishing relations of friendship and good-will between the peoples of Great Britain and Ireland." The amnesty applied to 1,010 persons still in confinement in Britain.
- Aristide Briand resigned as Prime Minister of France.
- By a narrow margin of 46 to 41, the United States Senate voted to allow Republican U.S. Senator Truman H. Newberry of Michigan to retain his seat. The vote was along party lines, with 9 Republicans joining all 32 Democrats in the Senate in opposing the seating of Newberry.
- Born: Tadeusz Żychiewicz, Polish journalist and art historian; in Bratkowice(d. 1994)

== January 13, 1922 (Friday) ==
- The conference at Cannes, regarding German reparations, ended abruptly after the resignation of France's Prime Minister Aristide Briand, but with an agreement to allow Germany to temporarily suspend reparations payments.
- Adolf Hitler was sentenced to three months in prison for disrupting a meeting at a beer hall where speaker Otto Ballerstedt was seriously injured.
- The first and last elections for the Vilnius Sejm, the parliament of the Republic of Central Lithuania were held, for the primary purpose of voting in favor of annexation of the puppet state into Poland. The voting was boycotted by most of the Lithuanians in the Vilnius region, and the legislators elected were of Polish ancestry. On February 20, the new parliament would vote for the "republic" to be legally annexed into Poland.
- WHA in Madison, Wisconsin became the first licensed radio station in that state.
- WLB in Minneapolis, the first radio station in the state of Minnesota, went on the air.
- Born: Albert Lamorisse, French filmmaker and writer; in Paris (d. 1970)

== January 14, 1922 (Saturday) ==
- The Southern Ireland Parliament in Dublin formally ratified the Anglo-Irish Treaty of 1921 and appointed Michael Collins as Chairman of the Irish Free State provisional government.
- The proposed evacuation of 120,000 Armenian Christians from Turkey was called for by Paul Hymans, President of the League of Nations, in his address to the League Council as Hymans read aloud a telegram that had been sent to Cardinal Désiré-Joseph Mercier, the Roman Catholic Primate of Belgium, by the Armenian Catholic Patriarchate, asking for League assistance. Gabriel Hanotaux, France's representative to the League, informed the council that France had worked on protecting Armenian Catholics and other Christian minorities in Cilicia from further violence and had voted to provide 30 million French francs for that goal. The Council took the matter under advisement and adjourned until April 25.
- The Port of Natal, the South American shipping port located closest to Europe, was inaugurated at the Brazilian city of Natal, Rio Grande do Norte.
- All five passengers and crew on a Handley Page Transport airliner were killed when the O/400 biplane crashed on its approach to Paris–Le Bourget Airport on its flight from London's Croydon Airport.
- U.S. Postmaster General Will H. Hays announced his resignation in order to become the first chairman of the newly formed film industry group, the Motion Picture Producers and Distributors of America (MPAA).
- Died:
  - Leo Hirschfield, Austrian-born American candy manufacturer, creator of the Tootsie Roll candy; committed suicide.
  - Ben Shibe, 83, American sporting goods manufacturer, owner and president of the Philadelphia Athletics from 1901 until his death (b. 1838)

== January 15, 1922 (Sunday) ==
- The Leipzig War Crimes Trials, an attempt by the Allied Powers to prosecute German Empire nationals who had committed atrocities during World War I, effectively came to an end when the Allied Commission concluded that allowing Germany's Weimar Republic to sentence war criminals had been ineffective because of the lenient sentences.

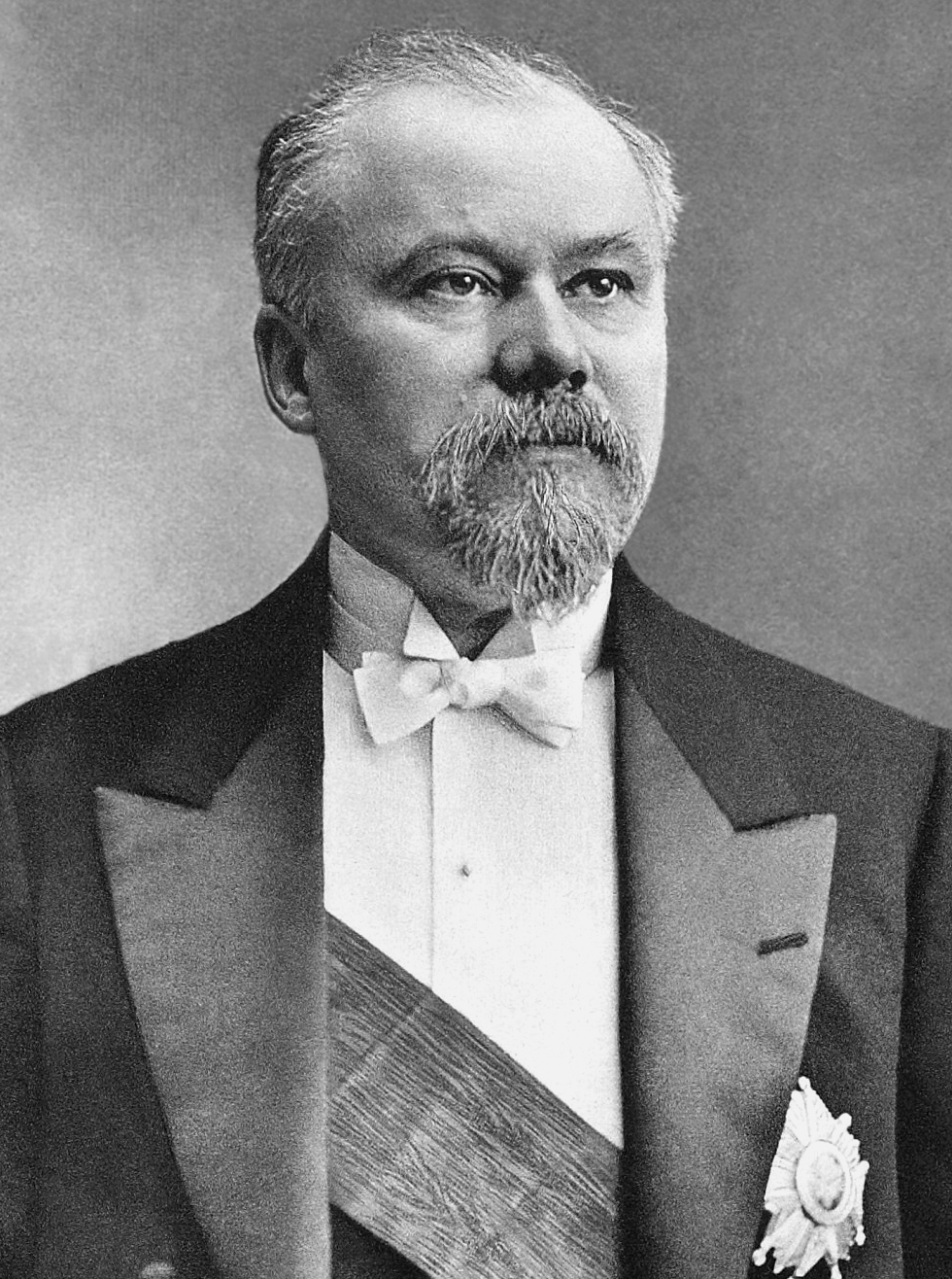
Prime Minister Raymond Poincaré

- Raymond Poincaré became Prime Minister of France for the second time, after organizing a new Cabinet of ministers to replace the cabinet of Aristide Briand.
- The Woodrow Wilson Foundation was launched at a meeting in Washington, D.C. After the meeting, several thousand supporters marched two miles to greet Woodrow Wilson at his home. "I need hardly tell you that such a demonstration and evidence of friendship makes me very happy," Wilson told the crowd from his doorstep. "There can be no doubt as to the vitality of the League of Nations."

== January 16, 1922 (Monday) ==
- Michael Collins and his cabinet entered Dublin Castle and formally took possession from the British administration to begin his leadership as Chairman of the Provisional Government of Southern Ireland as part of the Anglo-Irish Treaty signed a month earlier.
- The Kabardino-Balkarian Autonomous Oblast was created within the Russian SFSR as the breakup of the Mountain Autonomous Soviet Socialist Republic continued.
- Born: Ernesto Bonino, Italian singer; in Turin, Kingdom of Italy (d. 2008)

== January 17, 1922 (Tuesday) ==
- Following protests by the Sikh community, the colonial government of British India released all imprisoned Sikh activists arrested for participating in the non-cooperation movement. Sikh independence movement leader, Baba Kharak Singh, was released from jail six weeks after his November arrest, and control of the Golden Temple was returned to him at Amritsar.
- Ion I. C. Brătianu became Prime Minister of Romania for the fourth time.
- A 7.9 magnitude earthquake took place in Peru in the sparsely populated Department of Loreto in the Amazon rainforest, at 3.025°S 71.398°W. Because of the remote location and the depth of the quake (475 kilometres (295 mi) underground), no measurable damage was reported.
- Born:
  - Betty White, American TV comedian and actress with a career that spanned almost 70 years, winner of eight Emmy Awards and a Grammy Award, and inducted in the Television Hall of Fame in 1995; in Oak Park, Illinois (d. 2021)
  - Luis Echeverria Alvarez, Mexican politician and lawyer, served as the President of Mexico from 1970 to 1976; in Mexico City (d. 2022)
  - Robert Eisner, American economist and expert on macroeconomics; in New York City (d. 1998)
  - Boris Khodorov, Soviet and Russian physiologist; in Kerch, Crimean ASSR (present-day Crimea) (d. 2014)
  - Nicholas Katzenbach, American lawyer, served as the U.S. Attorney General from 1964 to 1966; in Philadelphia (d. 2012)
- Died: George B. Selden, 75, American patent lawyer and inventor who filed for the first U.S. patents for an automobile in 1879 (b. 1846)

== January 18, 1922 (Wednesday) ==
- Kazys Grinius resigned as Prime Minister of Lithuania after 18 months in office, along with the rest of his government, in the wake of the "saccharin scandal" that linked his Foreign Minister, Juozas Purickis, to use of diplomatic privileges for the smuggling of contraband items. Grinius's predecessor, Ernestas Galvanauskas, formed a new government 15 days later on February 2.
- A group of unemployed Dublin workers including the future noted author Liam O'Flaherty seized the Rotunda Concert Hall in protest of the "apathy of the authorities" and flew a red flag from one of the windows. Many Dubliners were hostile to the sight of the red flag and the demonstration soon attracted an angry mob.
- Born:
  - John Heath, English entomologist and specialist in lepidoptery, chief editor of The Moths and Butterflies of Great Britain and Ireland, and conservationist; in Worcester, Worcestershire (d. 1987)
  - Hugh Felkin, English-born French chemist, devised the "Felkin model" to predict the stereochemistry of nucleophilic addition reactions to carbonyl groups and modified it with the "Felkin–Anh model" (d. 2001)

== January 19, 1922 (Thursday) ==
- Germany was allowed to reclaim its embassy building in Washington, which had been confiscated during the World War I.
- Born:
  - Charles Lee Remington, American entomologist, professor at Yale University, and is considered to be the father of modern lepidoptery; in Reedville, Virginia (d. 2007)
  - Guy Madison, American TV and film actor known for his portrayal of the title character in the series The Adventures of Wild Bill Hickok; as Robert Ozell Moseley, in Pumpkin Center, California (d. 1996)
  - Miguel Muñoz Mozún, Spanish football midfielder and manager, spending majority of his career with Real Madrid and Spain; in Madrid (d. 1990)
  - Aleksey Prokhorov, Soviet Air Forces combat pilot and twice awarded the title Hero of the Soviet Union; in Rozhdestvenskoe, RSFSR, Soviet Union (present-day Russia) (d. 2002)

== January 20, 1922 (Friday) ==
- American confectioner Harry Burt applied for the first patent for the process of manufacturing a melted chocolate coating that could be applied to ice cream mass production of his invention, the Good Humor bar, for resale by way of ice cream trucks. Burt would be granted U.S. Patent No. 1,470,524 on October 9, 1923, for "Process of Making Frozen Confections." The application was filed four days before the patent for a similar chocolate-covered ice cream product on a stick, the Eskimo Pie, was granted on January 24 to Christian Kent Nelson.
- The condition of Pope Benedict XV was reported to be grave.
- The Lithuanian National Assembly approved the abolition of titles of nobility as well as the abolition of capital punishment.
- Born: Ed Westcott, American photojournalist and historian for the U.S. Army Corps of Engineers who documented the construction of Oak Ridge, Tennessee and the work of the Manhattan Project; as James Edward Westcott, in Chattanooga, Tennessee (d. 2019)
- Died: Milton L. Haney, 96, American regimental chaplain in the United States Army during the American Civil War, recipient of the Medal of Honor for his heroism at the 1864 Battle of Atlanta; died of pneumonia (b. 1825)

== January 21, 1922 (Saturday) ==
- The occupation of the Dublin concert hall ended when the occupiers left the building under police protection.
- Born:
  - Telly Savalas, American actor, best known as the star of the TV show Kojak; as Aristotelis Savalas, in Garden City, New York (d. 1994)
  - Lincoln Alexander, Canadian lawyer and politician, served as Labour Minister from 1979 to 1980, later served as Lieutenant Governor of Ontario; in Toronto (d. 2012)
  - Sam Mele, American professional baseball player and manager; as Sabath Mele, in Astoria, New York (d. 2017)
  - Paul Scofield, English actor; as David Paul Scofield, in Birmingham, England (d. 2008)
- Died: Charles Henry Miller, 79, American landscape artist (b. 1842)

== January 22, 1922 (Sunday) ==
- Pope Benedict XV died early at 6:00 in the morning local time in Rome. A premature report of his death had been given out the day before when a dispatch from the Wolff Bureau news agency in Berlin had reported that "Pope Benedict died at 5:15 o'clock this afternoon, Rome time", causing the German Reichstag to suspend proceedings and evening newspapers in London to report the death. In the afternoon a procession of the Palatine Guard, Swiss Guard and others solemnly transported the body through the Apostolic Palace to the papal throne room where it lay in state.
- Born:
  - Annabelle Lee, American baseball pitcher who pitched the first perfect game by a female professional baseball player, in 1944 for the Minneapolis Millerettes of the All-American Girls Professional Baseball League; in Los Angeles (d. 1998)
  - Leonel Brizola, Brazilian politician and Governor of Rio de Janeiro state; in Carazinho, Rio Grande do Sul (d. 2004)
  - Howard Moss, American poet, dramatist and critic, in New York City (d. 1987)
  - Fereydoun Mirza Qajar, Iranian member of royalty during the rule of the Qajar dynasty, pretender to the throne after the death of his father, Ahmad Shah Qajar; in Tehran, Sublime State of Iran (d. 1975)
- Died:
  - Fredrik Bajer, 84, Danish politician and pacifist, recipient of the Nobel Peace Prize in 1908 (b. 1837)
  - James Bryce, 1st Viscount Bryce, 83, Irish-born politician, diplomat and historian who served as Chief Secretary for Ireland from 1905 to 1907 and British Ambassador to the United States from 1907 to 1913 (b. 1838)

== January 23, 1922 (Monday) ==
- At Toronto General Hospital, 14-year old Leonard Thompson received an injection of refined insulin, after the allergic reaction from the first injection on January 11, by James Collip. This time the treatment was successful. John James Rickard Macleod and Frederick Banting would receive the 1923 Nobel Prize in Physiology or Medicine for their research.
- U.S. President Warren G. Harding opened an agricultural conference in Washington. In the conference's opening speech Harding proposed that the farming industry organize along the lines of other industries, with machinery of finance for furnishing operating capital.
- Died: Arthur Nikisch, 66, Hungarian conductor (b. 1855)

== January 24, 1922 (Tuesday) ==
- U.S. Patent #1,404,539 was issued to candy store owner Christian Kent Nelson of Onawa, Iowa for his invention of a process of covering ice cream with melted chocolate. Originally sold by Nelson under the name "I-Scream Bars", the confection would be trademarked as the "Eskimo Pie" for mass production and marketing. The new confection was an immediate success. In 2021, it would re-branded once more as an Edy's Pie.
- Composer Felix Borowski was shot at with a pistol and then beaten with it in his Chicago apartment. Borowski's secretary was arrested and confessed to the crime, saying that Borowski had derailed his career as a pianist and that he had "nothing to live for."
- Composer Carl Nielsen's Symphony No. 5 was given its first performance, as the Copenhagen Symphony Orchestra performed the score nine days after it had been completed by Nielsen.
- Popular English pianist Myra Hess made her American debut at a concert in New York City.
- Born: Charles W. Socarides, psychiatrist; in Brockton, Massachusetts (d. 2005)

== January 25, 1922 (Wednesday) ==
- Liang Shiyi was forced to resign as Premier of the Republic of China after only 32 days in office. Liang's dismissal was the result of a conflict between two warlords, Wu Peifu of the Zhili clique, and Liang's supporter, Zhang Zuolin, of the Fengtian clique. As the conflict worsened, the First Zhili–Fengtian War broke out on April 10 and would lead to Zhang's defeat of Wu by June 18.
- A detachment of U.S. Marines was sent to invade Nicaragua in order to protect the U.S. Embassy in the capital, Managua. The Marines were brought to the Central American nation, transported by the cruiser USS Galveston and disembarking at Corinto.
- The United States Army Band was established.

== January 26, 1922 (Thursday) ==
- Anti-lynching movement –– The United States House of Representatives voted, 230 to 119, to approve the Anti-Lynching Bill sponsored by Congressman Leonidas C. Dyer of Missouri, that would have made lynching a federal crime. The bill was sent to the U.S. Senate and never came to a vote.
- Pope Benedict XV was buried in St. Peter's Basilica.
- Johann Schober resigned as Chancellor of Austria. Walter Breisky became acting chancellor.
- Born:
  - Bob Thomas, Hollywood film industry biographer; in San Diego (d. 2014)
  - Ellen Vogel, Dutch film and stage actress; in The Hague (d. 2015)

== January 27, 1922 (Friday) ==
- In an event now commemorated annually in Bangladesh as the Salanga massacre, British Indian police fired upon a crowd of Bengali independence activists led by Abdur Rashid Tarkabagish. Hundreds of civilians, and perhaps as many as 4,500 were killed, either from gunshot wounds or being trampled in the panic that followed. A mass grave remains near Salanga Haat in Raiganj Upazila, in what was then the Bengal province of British India and is now part of the Sirajganj District in Bangladesh.
- The Dublin Gazette, the official British governmental newspaper of record in Ireland since 1705, published its final issue, and its offices were turned over to the control of Irish Free State authorities.
- Johann Schober was re-elected Chancellor of Austria by the National Assembly.
- The University of Illinois college football team disqualified nine of its players after confirmation that the students had accepted payment to play in a semi-professional game in Carlinville, Illinois on November 27. The Illini players for Carlinville (which lost the game to Taylorsville 16 to 0) implicated in the scandal included Jack Crangle, Joey Sternaman and Laurie Walquist, while statements also confirmed that three Notre Dame stars (Gus Desch, John Mohardt and Chet Wynne) had participated as well. Each received $200 (equivalent to $3,100 in 1921) for one game. Rumors that specific players had been hired for the game had started in Carlinville in November, The New York Times reported, "But each person who received the 'confidential' information apparently passed it on to another friend, for gradually the word spread..."
- Born: Maria Lucília Estanco Louro, Portuguese peace activist and dissident; in Beja (d. 2018)
- Died:
  - Nellie Bly, 57, American journalist and adventurer who traveled around the world in 72 days on assignment for the New York World in 1889 and 1890; died of pneumonia (b. 1864)
  - George Robert White, 74, American philanthropist and soap manufacturer (b. 1847)
  - Giovanni Verga, 81, Italian writer; died of cerebral thrombosis (b. 1840)
  - Count Johann Nepomuk Wilczek, 84, Austrian explorer (b. 1837)

== January 28, 1922 (Saturday) ==
- Ninety-six people died, and 133 were injured, in the collapse of the Knickerbocker Theatre in Washington, D.C. A few minutes before 9:00 in the evening, the roof gave way under the weight of 29 inches (740 mm) of snow that had fallen in the first 28 hours of a blizzard, while at least 300 people were inside watching a silent movie, Get-Rich-Quick Wallingford. The roof fell upon people in the theater balcony, and the balcony itself then fell upon people in the seats below.
- The British ocean liner SS Athenia, built for the Anchor-Donaldson Line, was launched from Glasgow, to go into service in 1923. On September 3, 1939, the day of the United Kingdom's declaration of war on Nazi Germany, the Athenia would become the first British ship to be torpedoed and sunk during World War II.
- Born: Robert W. Holley, American biochemist and recipient of the Nobel Prize in Physiology or Medicine in 1968; in Urbana, Illinois (d.1993)
- Died: Andrew Jackson Barchfeld, 58, American politician, served as the U.S. Congressman for Pennsylvania from 1905 to 1917; killed in the Knickerbocker Theatre collapse (b. 1863)

== January 29, 1922 (Sunday) ==
- Elections were held for the Chamber of Deputies and the Senate of the Republic of Portugal. The Partido Republicano Liberal of Prime Minister Francisco Cunha Leal, which had governed with 79 of the 163 seats of the chamber and 32 of the 70 seats of the Senate, lost more than half of its members. The Partido Democrático of Afonso Costa emerged as the largest in Parliament, with 74 seats in the Chamber and 37 in the Senate, and António Maria da Silva became the new Premier.
- Born: Gerda Steinhoff, Nazi concentration camp overseer; in Danzig-Langfuhr, Free State of Danzig, Germany (present-day Wrzeszcz, Poland) (d. 1946, hanged for war crimes)

== January 30, 1922 (Monday) ==
- The Permanent Court of International Justice, unofficially called the "World Court" and created by the League of Nations, held its first session, convening at the Peace Palace at The Hague in the Netherlands. At its first session, the nine judges and three deputies elected Bernard Loder, a justice on the Supreme Court of the Netherlands, as the first President of the Permanent Court.
- General Marie-Eugène Debeney predicted that the next war would be fought with "tanks, aeroplanes, and gas served by specially trained crews." The front lines would be manned only by skeleton detachments serving as observers and listeners, due to the number of personnel necessary to run the war machinery.
- Born:
  - Dick Martin, American comedian and director, known for his role on Rowan & Martin's Laugh-In; as Thomas Richard Martin, in Battle Creek, Michigan (d. 2008)
  - Karl-Heinz Weber, German Luftwaffe flying ace with 136 aerial victories during World War II; in Heringsdorf, Weimar Republic (d. 1944, killed in action)
  - Joseph C. McConnell, U.S. Air Force F-86 Sabre fighter pilot and the most successful, to date, of American jet fighter aces with 16 aerial victories in jet combat during the Korean War; in Dover, New Hampshire (d. 1954, killed in jet crash)

== January 31, 1922 (Tuesday) ==
- The U.S. Senate passed an $11 billion foreign debt refunding bill and voted down an amendment to use the interest to finance a soldier's bonus.
- Ireland's National Army, composed of Irish Republican Army volunteers who supported the Anglo-Irish Treaty, made its first public appearance as command of a British Army barracks near Dublin was transferred to Irish Army control.
