= Budokan (disambiguation) =

The Nippon Budokan, often called the Budokan for short, is a historic arena in central Tokyo, Japan.

Budokan may also refer to:

- Akita Prefectural Budokan, an arena in Akita, Japan
- Budokan karate, a style of martial arts created in 1966 by Chew Choo Soot
- Budokan: The Martial Spirit, a 1989 computer game by Electronic Arts
- Miyamoto Musashi Budokan, a martial arts hall in Ōhara, Okayama, Japan

== See also ==
- At Budokan (disambiguation), live albums recorded at Nippon Budokan
