= Bunyan Saptomo =

Indonesian diplomat (born 1957)

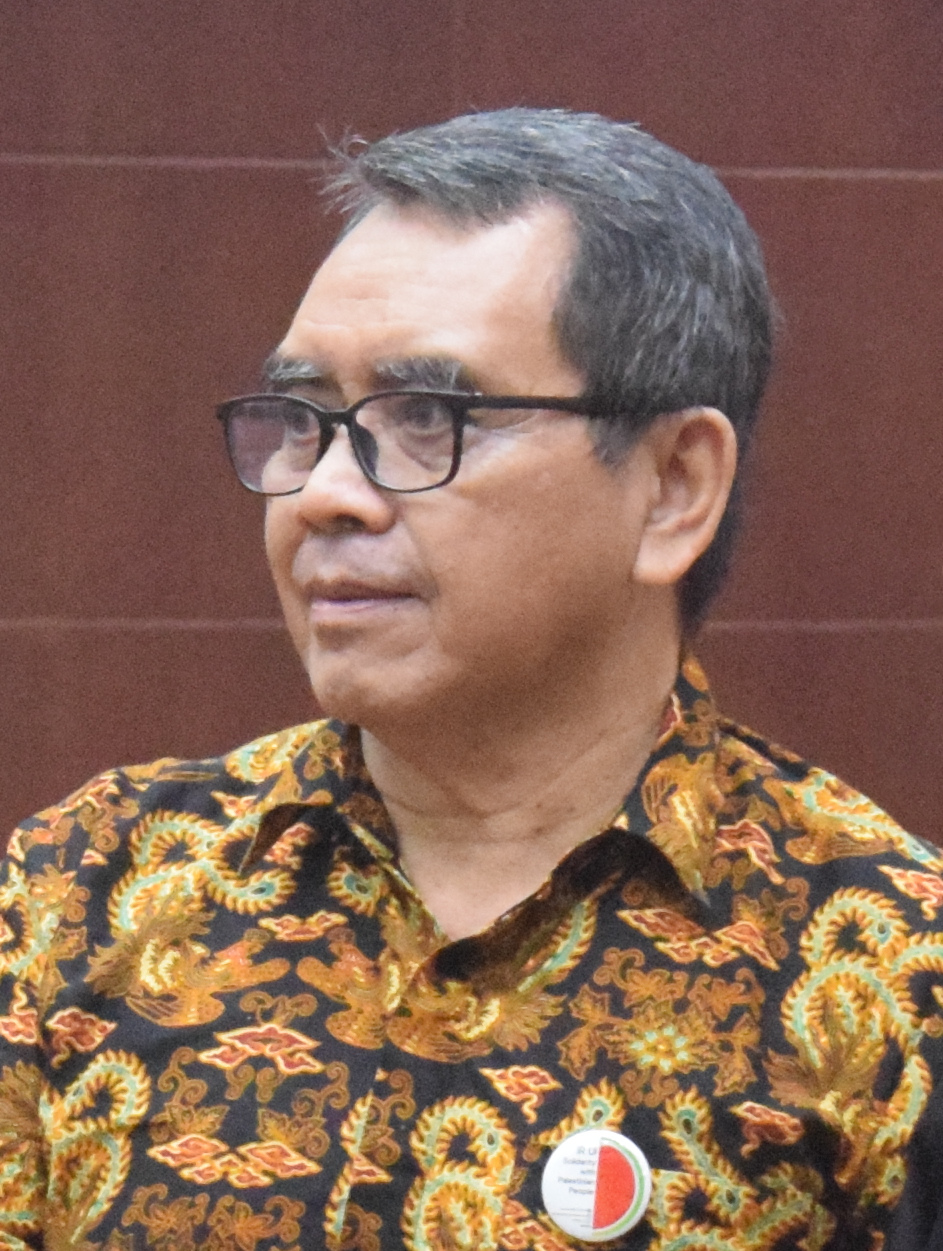

Ambassador of Indonesia to Bulgaria and Albania
- In office 2 March 2012 – January 2016
- President: Susilo Bambang Yudhoyono
- Preceded by: Immanuel Robert Inkiriwang
- Succeeded by: Sri Astari Rasjid

Personal details
- Born: March 20, 1957 (age 69) Klaten, Central Java, Indonesia
- Spouse: Aprilia Bodriyati
- Children: 1
- Education: Gadjah Mada University (Drs.) unknown (MA)
- Awards: Madara Horseman, 1st class (2016)

Bunyan Saptomo (born 20 March 1957) is an Indonesian diplomat who had served in various positions, mostly relating to human rights and North America. He had been posted internally in the foreign ministry and human rights agencies of Indonesia, and abroad in Canberra, Hanoi, Vancouver, and Sofia. A Gadjah Mada University graduate, Bunyan's last post in the foreign service was as ambassador to Bulgaria and Albania from 2012 to 2016. He is currently serving as the head of the international relations division of the Indonesian Ulama Council.

== Early life and education ==
Bunyan was born in Klaten, Central Java, on 20 March 1957. From 1974 to 1976, he studied at a Muhammadiyah-owned high school in Klaten, where he joined the Muhammadiyah Students' Union. He closely followed the student unrest at the University of Malaya (UM) in 1974, which was led by the-then president of the Malaysian Youth Council Anwar Ibrahim.

He began studying governance sciences at the Gadjah Mada University in 1977 and joined the Muslim Students' Association. Upon graduating with a bachelor's degree in 1981, Bunyan initially aspired to become a camat, or district head, in his hometown of Klaten, which was also the wish of his parents. However, he failled to pass the civil service entrance exam for the Klaten and Central Java regional government. He then moved to Jakarta and applied as a journalist for the Antara state news agency and in the foreign department. He was accepted to the foreign department and completed his basic diplomatic education in 1984.

== Diplomatic career ==
Bunyan began his diplomatic service in 1986, serving as a staff in the political section at the Indonesian embassy in Canberra until 1989. He later served as the head of the information, social, and cultural field at the Indonesian embassy in Hanoi in 1994, followed by a posting as the head of the information field at the Indonesian embassy in Beijing from 1996 to 1998.

Upon returning to Indonesia, Bunyan completed his mid-level diplomatic education in 1998 and senior diplomatic education in 1999. He was assigned in the foreign ministry as deputy director (chief of subdirectorate) for people's welfare cooperation in the directorate of social and cultural relations. Following the establishment of the state ministry for human rights by President Abdurrahman Wahid, Bunyan served in the ministry as an assistant deputy. After the ministry was merged into the justice ministry to form the ministry of justice and human rights, Bunyan continued his work in human rights, consecutively serving as director of human rights development in 2001 and director for human rights advancement cooperation in 2002.

After holding human rights related positions in government ministries, by January 2005 he was posted as consul general in Vancouver. During his tenure, he became the first consul general from Indonesia to visit Prince Rupert city, where he oversaw the grain-handling facilities used to export grain to Indonesia. He was also involved in fundraising for the victims of the 2006 Yogyakarta earthquake and oversaw the construction of houses for people affected by the 2004 Indian Ocean earthquake and tsunami in Aceh. He departed Vancouver in June 2008.

Bunyan was sworn in as the director of North and Central America within the foreign ministry on 24 April 2008. In August 2011, Bunyan was nominated by President Susilo Bambang Yudhoyono as the ambassador of Indonesia to Bulgaria and Albania. His nomination was approved by the House of Representative's first commission on 13 September after undergoing an assessment several days before. He was installed on 2 March 2012 and presented his credentials to the President of Bulgaria Rosen Plevneliev on 20 April 2012.

As ambassador, he was tasked with bringing 10 investors to Indonesia; 15 joined him on his visit to Indonesia in October 2014. He also managed to secure support from Bulgaria for Indonesia's nomination for the presidency of the Badminton World Federation in 2013 and oversaw the establishment of an Indonesian corner at the Sofia University in 2014. The embassy also opened an honorary consulate in Varna in November 2015. In Albania, Bunyan oversaw the plans for the establishment of an honorary consulate and a seminar on Albania-Indonesia economic relations with the economic ministry and the chamber of commerce. At the end of his tenure as ambassador in January 2016, Bunyan received the Madara Horseman, 1st class medal from President Plevneliev and from the Bulgarian Badminton Federation. He briefly served as a functional diplomat, where he was involved in repatriating arrested prospective Hajj pilgrims in Philippines in 2016, before retiring from diplomatic service.

== Later life ==
After retirement, Bunyan was involved in various religious organizations, where he advised or directed the organization on international relations matters. As the secretary general of the Indonesian Society for Organization of Islamic Cooperation, he and other Indonesian interfaith leaders participated in a dialogue with the Vice President of the United States Mike Pence. He is a member of the foreign relations and cooperation department of the Indonesian Mosque Council since 2017, serving as its secretary until 2022, and the international cooperation and relations agency of Muhammadiyah from 2022. Within the Indonesian Ulema Council, Bunyan is the chairman of the organization's international cooperation and relations commission.

== Personal life ==
Bunyan is married to Aprilia Bodriyati and has a son, Ibnu Sulhan, who followed his footsteps as a diplomat.
