= Sinyavka =

Sinyavka Синявка
- Selo
- Location within Voronezh Oblast Location within Russia
- Coordinates: 51°15′N 40°59′E
- Country: Russia
- Region: Voronezh Oblast
- District: Talovsky District
- Time zone: UTC+3:00

Sinyavka (Russian: Синявка) is a rural locality (a selo) and the administrative center of Sinyavskoye Rural Settlement, Talovsky District, Voronezh Oblast, Russia. In the 19th century the village was part of Sinyavskaya volost, Novokhopyorsky Uyezd, Voronezh Governorate. The population was 984 as of 2010. There are 8 streets.

== Geography ==
Sinyavka is located 32 km northeast of Talovaya (the district's administrative centre) by road. Sorokovoy is the nearest rural locality.
