= Aleksey Prokhorov =

Societ Il-2 pilot (1922–2002)

- Алексей Николаевич Прохоров
- Born: 19 January 1922; Rozhdestvenskoe, Novokhopyorsky Uyezd, Voronezh Governorate, RSFSR, USSR
- Died: 27 May 2002 (aged 80); Moscow, Russia
- Military career
- Allegiance: Soviet Union
- Branch: Soviet Air Force
- Service years: 1940 – 1988
- Rank: General-major of Aviation
- Unit: 15th Guards Assault Aviation Regiment
- Conflicts: World War II
- Awards: Hero of the Soviet Union (twice)

Aleksey Nikolayevich Prokhorov (Russian: Алексе́й Никола́евич Про́хоров; 19 January 1922 – 27 May 2002) was an Il-2 pilot in the Soviet Air Forces during the Second World War who was twice awarded the title Hero of the Soviet Union.

== Early life ==
Prokhorov was born on 19 January 1922 to a Russian family in the village of Rozhdestvenskoe, in the Novokhopyorsky Uyezd of Voronezh Governorate. A decade after moving to the city of Borisoglebsk in 1930 he graduated from the local aeroclub and his tenth grade of school before being drafted into the Red Army in August 1940. Upon graduating from the Balashov Military Aviation School of Pilots in December 1942 he was posted to the 15th Separate Training Aviation Regiment, where he trained to fly the Il-2 until February 1943.

== World War II ==
Soon arriving at the warfront in March 1943 as a pilot in the 15th Guards Assault Aviation Regiment he rose up through the ranks and became close friends with Vladimir Aleksenko, another future twice Hero of the Soviet Union. By the time he was nominated for his first gold star on 11 November 1944 he had reached to position of deputy squadron commander and totaled 180 sorties. Later on during the battle for East Prussia he sometimes flew 3-4 sorties in a day, and during the entire operation not a single squadron member under his command was killed in action. On victory day he was nominated for a second gold star; during the war he flew in the battles for Leningrad, Königsberg, Novgorod, Tallinn, Vyborg, and Zemland among other strategically important areas as part of the Leningrad and 3rd Belorussian fronts, tallying a total of 238 sorties on the Il-2 in combat.

== Postwar ==
Initially remaining a squadron commander in his wartime regiment until October 1945. After graduating from the Air Force Academy of Monino in 1950 he became the deputy commander of the 232nd Assault Aviation Regiment, and in December 1953 he transferred to the position of regimental commander of the 947th Assault Aviation Regiment, which turned into a bomber regiment in 1956. He then became of commander of the 947th Fighter-Bomber Aviation Regiment, in May 1957, but in December 1958 he left the post of regimental commander. From 1959 to 1960 he worked at the 4th Research Center for Combat Use of the Air Force, where he researched fighter aircraft, and the next year he became chief of staff for the 455th Research Aviation Regiment, where he remained until becoming a lecturer at the Frunze Military Academy in 1967. In 1975 he moved on to become deputy head of the Irkutsk Higher Military Aviation Engineering School, and the next year he was promoted to the rank general-major; however, he left Siberia and returned to teaching at the Frunze Military Academy in 1979, where be remained until 1987. From then until retiring in February 1988 he headed the flight safety department of the air force. He died in Moscow on 27 May 2002 and was buried in the Troyekurovskoye Cemetery.

== Awards and honors ==
- Twice Hero of the Soviet Union (19 April 1945 and 29 June 1945)
- Order of Lenin (19 April 1945)
- Three Order of the Red Banner (27 January 1944, 17 June 1944, and 29 November 1944))
- Order of Alexander Nevsky (29 March 1945)
- Order of the Patriotic War 1st class (12 September 1944 and 11 March 1985)
- Order of the Red Star (23 July 1943 and 30 December 1956)
- Order "For Service to the Homeland in the Armed Forces of the USSR" 3rd class (30 April 1975)
- campaign and jubilee medals
