= Lafran Pane =

Indonesian academic (1922–1991)

Professor Lafran Pane
- Pane, undated
- Born: 5 February 1922; Padang Sidempuan, North Sumatra, Dutch East Indies
- Died: 25 January 1991 (aged 68); Yogyakarta
- Education: Islamic University of Indonesia; University of Gadjah Mada
- Occupation: Lecturer
- Known for: Muslim Student's Association Activism
- Awards: National Hero of Indonesia

Professor Lafran Pane (5 February 1922 – 25 January 1991) was an Indonesian academic who is best remembered for establishing the Muslim Students' Association and National Hero of Indonesia.

== Biography ==
Pane was born on 5 February 1922 in Padang Sidempuan, North Sumatra, the younger brother of poet Sanusi and novelist Armijn Pane.

By 1946 Pane was a student at the Islamic Higher School in Yogyakarta (now the Islamic University of Indonesia). In November of that year preparations began for an organization, based in Islam, which would unite university students of that faith and promote the social welfare of the Indonesian people. The Muslim Students' Association (Himpunan Mahasiswa Islam, or HMI) was formally established on 5 February 1947 by a group of 15 students, including Pane; however, only Pane is remembered as the organization's founder.

A 1957 Media article wrote that the early years of the HMI were virtually indistinguishable from the life of Pane. Though in his later years Pane participated with the organization, he never took the position that he needed to be respected. Owing to his relatively low profile, he was sometimes not recognized when he arrived for meetings, and thus asked to sit outside; one member later recalled that he was sometimes mistaken for government intelligence, come to spy on the meetings.

Pane became a full professor at IKIP Yogyakarta (now Yogyakarta State University).

Pane died after being struck by a motorcycle on 25 January 1991. He was buried in Karangkajen cemetery, together with Muhammadiyah's founder, Kiai Haji Ahmad Dahlan.< His second wife, Bisromah, died of a stroke on 9 March 2013. She was buried in the cemetery of the Kauman Grand Mosque, Yogyakarta. Together the couple had three sons.

== Legacy ==
Lukman Hakiem, a former HMI leader and member of the People's Representative Council, considered Pane an intelligent yet simple figure who was open to criticism; Hakiem recollected that Pane, though a professor, would ride his bicycle rather than a car or motorcycle like other lecturers or his students. A 2013 article in the daily Republika wrote that, "sadly" ("sayangnya") Pane was not yet a National Hero of Indonesia.

At least one street is named after Pane, in Depok, West Java.

== Works cited ==
- "Depok" (Map). Google Maps.
- "Kisah Sepeda Tua Professor Lafran" [The Story of Professor Lafran's Old Bicycle]. Republika (in Indonesian). 23 March 2013. Archived from the original on 29 March 2014.
- Maharani, Shinta (9 March 2013). "Istri Pendiri HMI, Lafran Pane, Wafat" [The Wife of the Founder of HMI, Lafran Pane, Dies]. Tempo (in Indonesian). Archived from the original on 30 March 2014.
- Nasar, M Fuad (19 March 2013). "Menatap Sosok HMI" [Remembering an HMI Figure]. Harian Pelita (in Indonesian). Archived from the original on 30 March 2014.
- "Sanusi Pane". Language Centre (in Indonesian). Jakarta: Ministry of Education. 15 July 2009.
- Rahardjo, Edzan (9 November 2017). "Aktivis HMI Ziarah dan Doa Bersama di Makam Lafran Pane" [HMI Activists Prayed Together in Lafran Pane Mausoleum]. Detik News (in Indonesian).
