= Karl-Heinz Meltzer =

Karlheinz Meltzer
- Born: 23 February 1922; Hamburg
- Died: 14 August 1943 (aged 21); Kharkov
- Military career
- Allegiance: Nazi Germany
- Branch: Luftwaffe
- Service years: 1939–1943
- Rank: Feldwebel
- Unit: JG 52
- Conflicts: World War II: Eastern Front; Battle of Voronezh (1942); Case Blue; Battle of Kursk; Belgorod-Khar'kov Offensive Operation
- Awards: German Cross in Gold

Feldwebel Karl-Heinz Meltzer (also known as Karlheinz) (23 February 1922 – August 1943) was a German fighter ace of World War II. He was born in Hamburg, served in the Luftwaffe on the Eastern front and was presumed killed in action in August 1943.

== Career ==
Karl-Heinz Meltzer was born on 23 February 1922 in Hamburg. He served in the Luftwaffe (German Air Force) during the Second World War and is credited as one of their most successful fighter aces.

== Early service ==
Following compulsory service in the Reicharbeitsdienst (German Labour Corps) in Northern Germany he enlisted in the Luftwaffe and trained as a fighter pilot. After pre-operational training at Ergänzungsjagdgruppe Ost (Training Fighter Wing – East) in the spring of 1942 during which he survived a major crash, he was transferred on 28 July 1942 as an Unteroffizier to 8./Jagdgeschwader 52 (JG 52—52nd Fighter Wing) flying near Rostov on the Eastern Front. This squadron was commanded by Günther Rall, the third most successful fighter pilot in history.

== Operational service ==
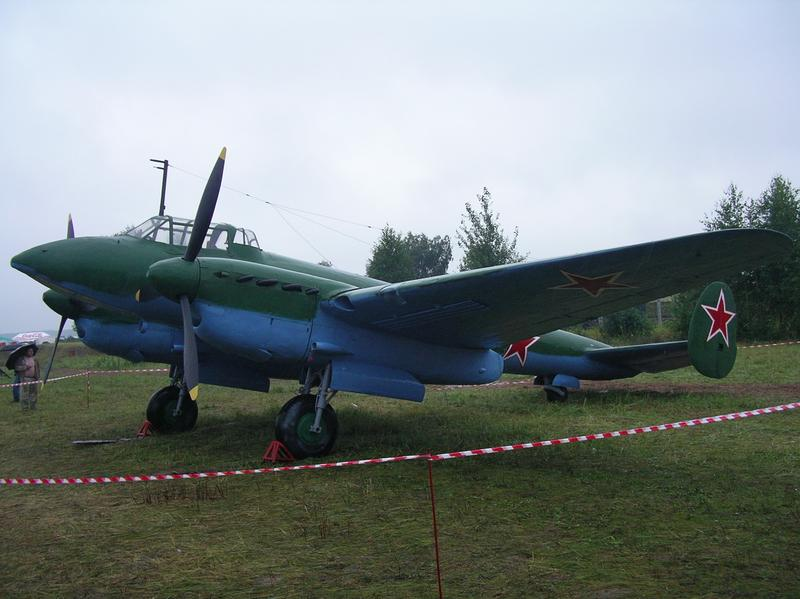
A preserved Pe-2 light bomber

Flying to the east of Mount Elbrus on 24 August 1942 Meltzer scored his first victory when he shot down a Russian Pe-2 fast light bomber. Between 21 September 1942 and 12 October 1942 in the same general area of operations he shot down 7 more Russian fighters and one Ilyushin-2 Stormovik ground attack bomber, and was belatedly awarded the Iron Cross 2nd Class and also the Iron Cross 1st Class.

Between 30 October and 5 November 1942 Meltzer shot down 7 more Russian fighters, bringing his score to 16 confirmed victories. Flying over the Crimea between 24 March 1943 and 28 May 1943 Meltzer shot down 10 Russian fighters, including two Supermarine Spitfires provided to the Russian air forces by the British, bringing his score to 26 victories.

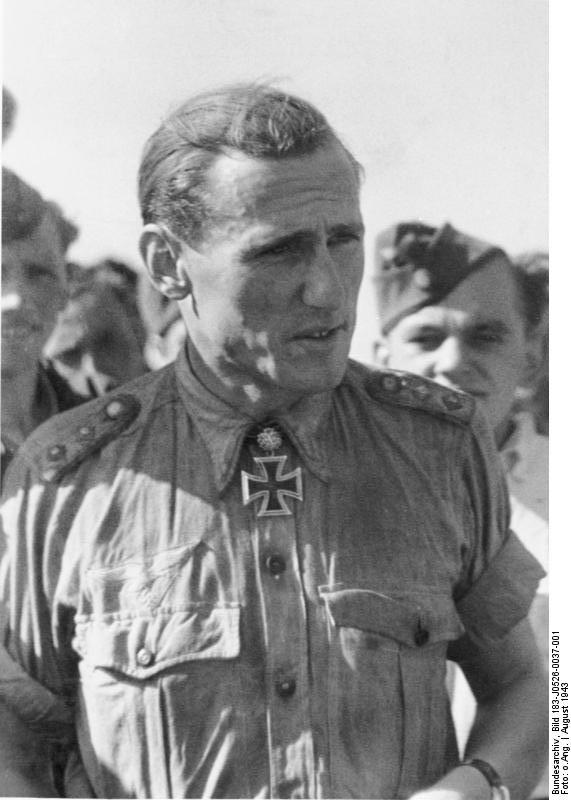
Unit commander Günther Rall

His unit moved to the Kharkov area in preparation for the Battle of Kursk, and, in flying operations between 4 and 12 July 1943, Meltzer shot down fourteen Russian aircraft, including 4 victories during four different missions on 5 July, one of which was the 2,500th victory of his parent unit the III Gruppe/JG 52. He also shot down 3 Russian aircraft in two missions on 6 July, one of which was his own 34th victory and counted as the 800th scored by his squadron, 8. Staffel. During combat above the enormous tank Battle of Kursk he flew several times as wingman to the commander of III. Gruppe of JG 52 Major Günther Rall. and also to Leutnant Friedrich Obleser now in command of 8. Staffel.

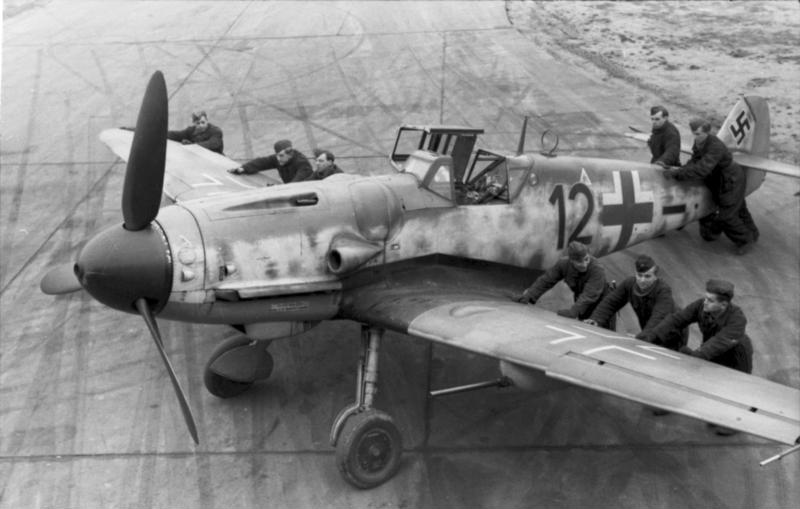
Luftwaffe ground-crew ("black men") positioning a Bf 109 G-6 "Kanonenvogel" equipped with the Rüstsatz VI underwing gondola cannon kit. Note the slats on the leading edge of the port wing. JG 2, France, autumn of 1943.

In the last two weeks of July his unit flew from bases further north near Orel, where he shot down more Russian aircraft before they moved south again to the Kharkov area; his 50th victory in early August 1943 was acknowledged as the 850th victory of 8 Staffel. John Weal in More Bf 109 Aces of the Russian Front states that “in the eleven days thereafter Meltzer was credited with 24 more (victories), taking his total to 74 before he was himself shot down near Kharkov on 14 August”.

Meltzer was shot down in combat over Russian-occupied territory, and, like many German aces, he was never seen again.

During his career Karlheinz Meltzer flew over 180 missions, and was credited with 74 aerial victories; of these 61 were confirmed, 4 were unconfirmed and 9 were in conjunction with his wingman, and he proposed that the score count to the credit of the junior pilot rather than his own (the Luftwaffe did not allow shared victories).

== See also ==
- List of World War II flying aces

== Awards ==
- Aviator badge (December 1941)
- Front Flying Clasp of the Luftwaffe in Gold (28 January 1943)
- Ehrenpokal der Luftwaffe (9 August 1943)
- Iron Cross (1939)
  - 2nd Class (9 October 1942)
  - 1st Class (27 October 1942)
- Ehrenpokal on 9 August 1943 as Unteroffizier and pilot in a Jagdgeschwader Award also recorded as Unteroffizier and pilot in the 8./Jagdgeschwader 52
- German Cross in Gold on 6 December 1943 as Unteroffizier in the 8./Jagdgeschwader 52 Award also recorded as Unteroffizier in a Jagdgeschwader

== Bibliography ==
- Bergström, Christer [in Swedish] (2007). Kursk—The Final Air Battle: July 1943. Hersham, Surrey: Classic Publications. ISBN 978-1-903223-88-8.
- Horst Scheibert (1984). Die Trager des Deutschen Kreuzes in Gold: Kriegsmarine, Luftwaffe, Waffen-SS; und, Des Deutschen Kreuzes in Silber : Heer, Kriegsmarine, Luftwaffen, Waffe-SS (German ed.). Podzun-Pallas-Verlag. p. 297. ISBN 3-7909-0223-3.
- Horst Schiebert (1986). Die Inhaber Des Ehrenpokals für besondere Leistung im Luftkrieg. Podzun Pallas Verlag. p. 231. ISBN 3-7909-0283-7.
- Ursula Hartmann (1992). German Fighter Ace Erich Hartmann: The Life Story of the World's Highest Scoring Ace. Schiffer Pub Limited. p. 102. ISBN 978-0-88740-396-5.
- Mathews, Andrew Johannes; Foreman, John (2015). Luftwaffe Aces — Biographies and Victory Claims — Volume 3 M–R. Walton on Thames: Red Kite. ISBN 978-1-906592-20-2.
- Colonel R F Toliver and T J Constable (1982). Horrido. Fighter Aces of the Luftwaffe. Bantam War Books.
- Christer Bergström (2007). Kursk: The Air Battle: July 1943. Classic. pp. 31, 60, 69 & 76. ISBN 978-1-903223-88-8.
- Walther-Peer Fellgiebel (2000) [1986]. Die Träger des Ritterkreuzes des Eisernen Kreuzes, 1939–1945: die Inhaber der höchsten Auszeichnung des Zweiten Weltkrieges aller Wehrmachtteile. Podzun-Pallas. ISBN 978-3-7909-0284-6.
- Weal, John (2004). Jagdgeschwader 52: The Experten. Aviation Elite Units. Vol. 15. Oxford, UK: Osprey Publishing. ISBN 978-1-84176-786-4.
- Weal, John (2007). More Bf 109 Aces of the Russian Front. Aircraft of the Aces. Vol. 76. Oxford, UK: Osprey Publishing. ISBN 978-1-84603-177-9.
