= Akita Prefectural Budokan =

Indoor arena in Akita, Japan

- 秋田県立武道館

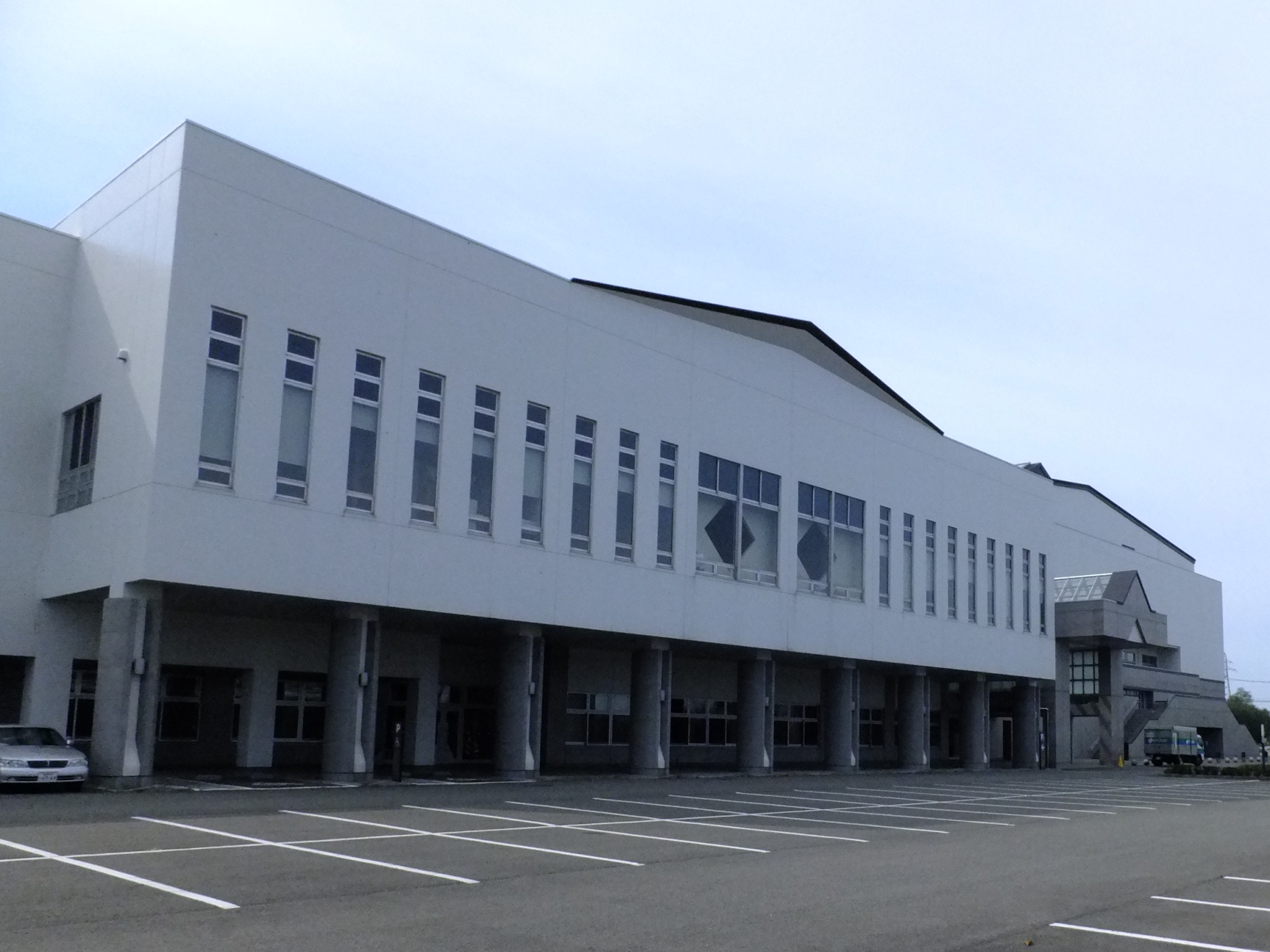

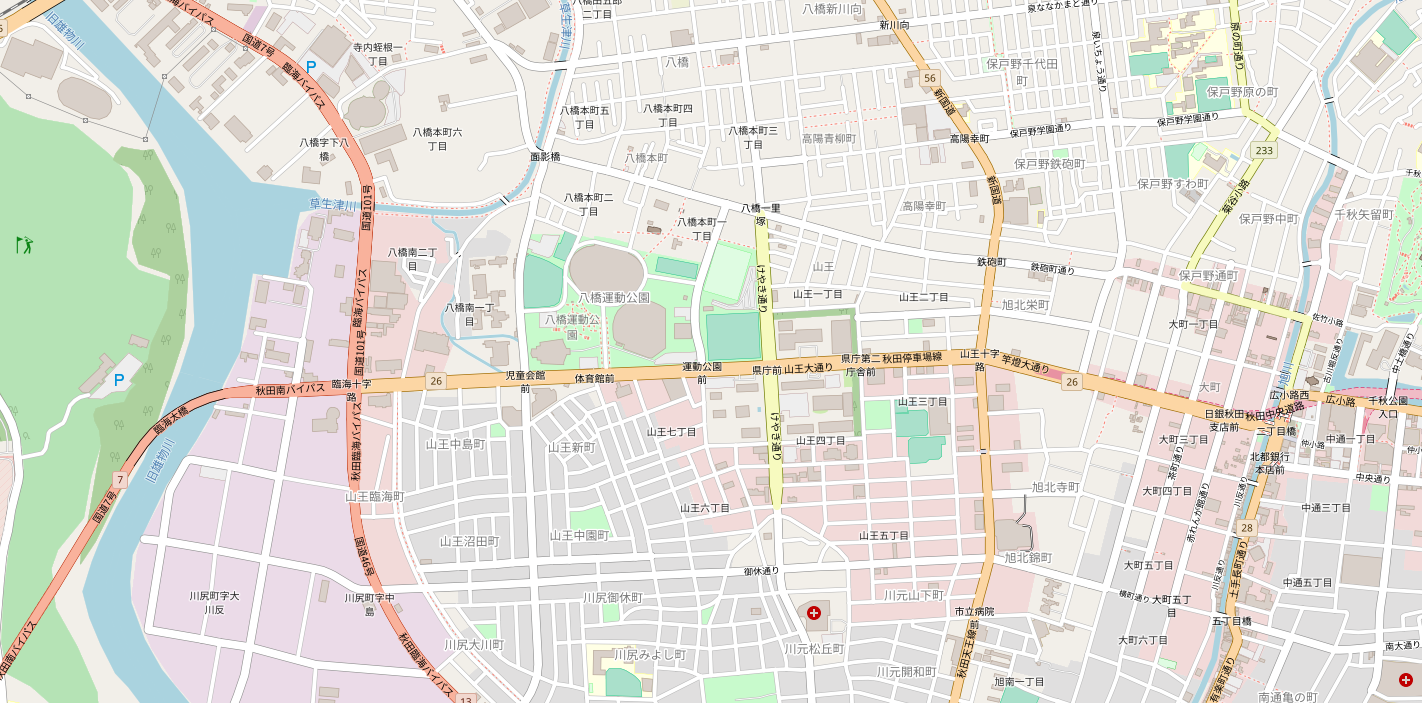
- Location within Akita, Akita Location within Akita Prefecture Location within Japan
- Interactive map of Akita Prefectural Budokan
- Location: Araya, Akita, Japan
- Coordinates: 39°43′37.52″N 140°4′36″E
- Owner: Akita Prefecture
- Capacity: Large dojo:2,517 Sumo ring:132 Archery court:84 Judojo:167; Kendo hall:100
- Field size: 18,657.00 sqm

Construction
- Opened: May 2004
- Architect: Yamashita Sekkei
- Main contractor: Nishimatsu Construction

Website
- http://www.akisouko.com/budokan/index.html

Akita Prefectural Budokan is an indoor arena located in Araya, Akita, Akita, Japan.

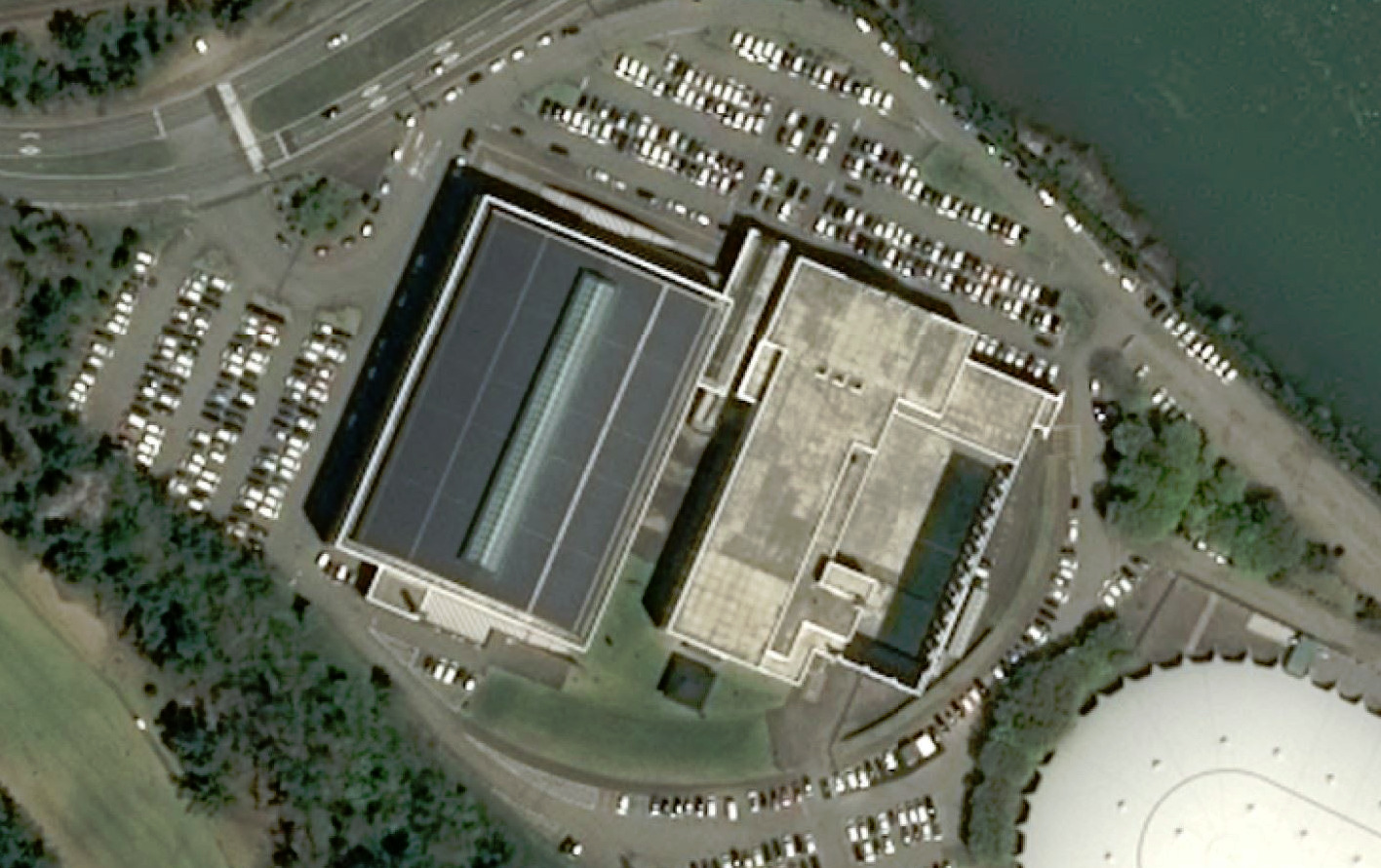
Satellite view

== Facilities ==
- Large dojo
- Small dojo
- Sumo rings
- Japanese archery courts
- Judojo
- Kendo hall

== Events ==
- National Sports Festival of Japan (2007)

== Location map ==
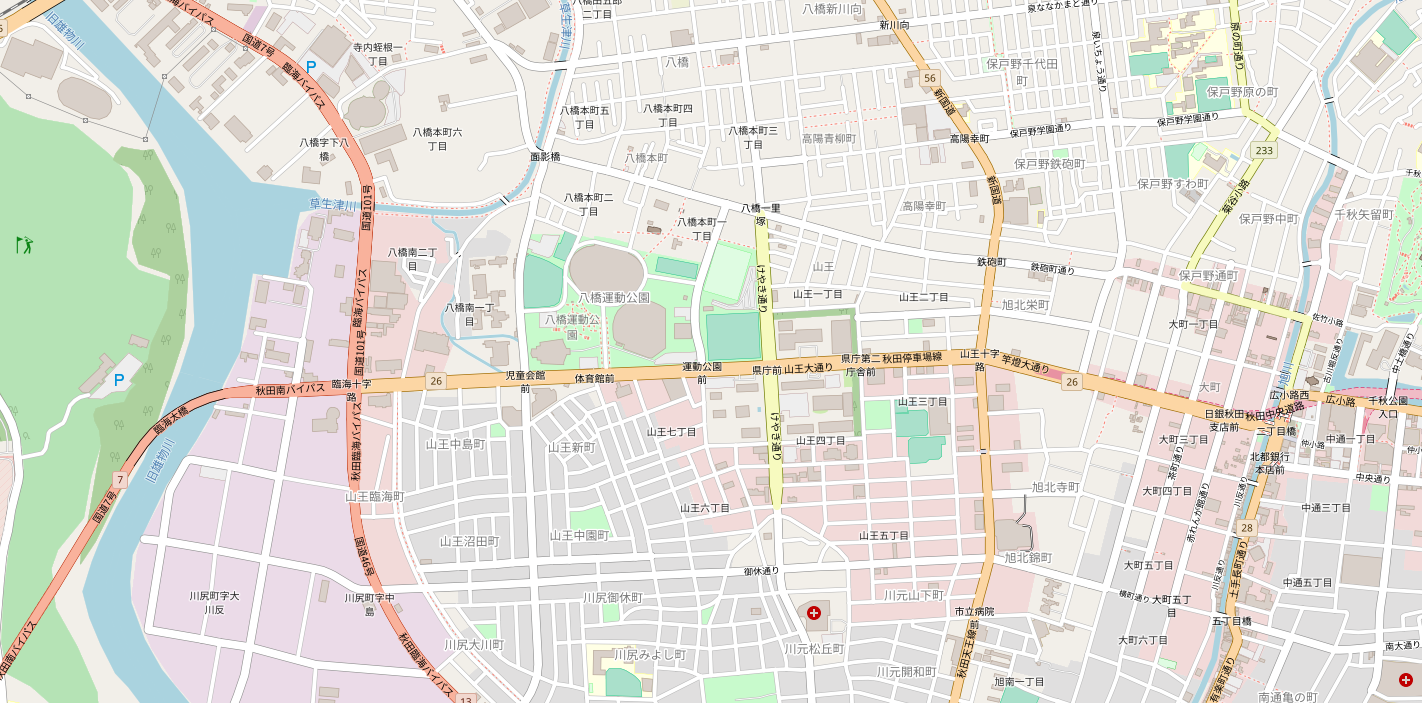
Akita Prefectural Budokan (Akita, Akita)
