= Muslim Students' Association (Indonesia) =

Islamic organization based in Indonesia

Islamic Students' Association
- Himpunan Mahasiswa Islam
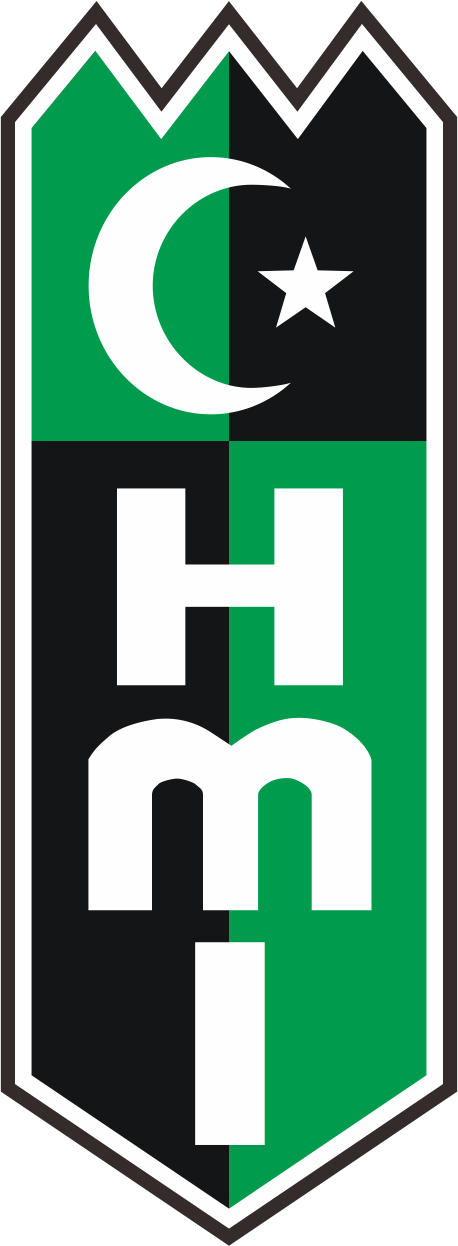
- The official logo of the Muslim Students' Association
- Abbreviation: HMI
- Formation: 5 February 1947; 79 years ago
- Founder: Lafran Pane
- Type: Student organization
- Purpose: The development of academic people, creators, servants, who are inspired by Islam and are responsible for the realization of a just and prosperous society that is blessed by Allah Subhanahu Wa Ta'ala.
- Location: Jakarta, Indonesia
- Region served: Indonesia
- Official language: Indonesian
- Website: pbhmi.id

The Muslim Students' Association (Indonesian: Himpunan Mahasiswa Islam, lit. 'Islamic Students' Association', abbreviated as HMI) is an Indonesian Muslim student organization. HMI is an independent organization with the objective of "connecting academics, creators – servants of Islam, and taking responsibility for creating a just people blessed by Allah".

== History ==
HMI was founded in Yogyakarta on 5 February 1947 at the initiative of Lafran Pane with 14 students from the Institute of Islam in Yogyakarta (Indonesian: Sekolah Tinggi Islam Yogyakarta), currently Indonesian Islamic University.

== Organizational structure ==
HMI operates through a multi-tier organizational hierarchy designed to coordinate student activities from the national level down to individual campuses.

=== National leadership ===
At the national level, the organization is led by the Pengurus Besar (PB) HMI, which functions as the central governing body. The PB coordinates policies, national programs, and organizational direction.

=== Regional coordination ===
Below the national leadership are Badan Koordinasi (BADKO) units, which manage coordination across several provinces or regional clusters.

=== Branch level ===
At the city or regency level, HMI operates through Pengurus Cabang (PC), commonly referred to as HMI Cabang. These branches coordinate activities across universities within a specific geographic area.
