= Novokhopyorsky Uyezd =

Novokhopyorsky Uyezd (Новохопёрский уезд) was one of the subdivisions of the Voronezh Governorate of the Russian Empire. It was situated in the eastern part of the governorate. Its administrative centre was Novokhopyorsk.

== Demographics ==
At the time of the Russian Empire Census of 1897, Novokhopyorsky Uyezd had a population of 192,436. Of these, 84.6% spoke Russian, 15.2% Ukrainian and 0.1% Romani as their native language.
