= Budokan karate =

Style of karate

Chew Choo Soot
- Date founded: 1966
- Country of origin: Malaysia
- Founder: Chew Choo Soot
- Arts taught: Karate • Kobudō
- Ancestor schools: Gōjū-ryū • Kung Fu • Judo • Jiujutsu • Shōtōkan • wrestling
- Practitioners: James Caan, Rod Kuratomi, Val Mijailovic, Takemasa Okuyama, Grant Campbell
- Official website: https://www.budokanworld.com/

Budokan (武道館, Budōkan) is a style of karate recognized by the World Union of Karate Do Organizations and the World Karate Federation. Karate Budokan International was founded in 1966 by Chew Choo Soot in Petaling Jaya, Malaysia.

== Founder ==
Chew Choo Soot was born in Alor Star, a Northern State of Peninsular Malaysia, on 7 February 1922. When Chew was an infant, his father died, and so he was brought up under the strict discipline of his grandfather, an elderly Confucian scholar who believed in education through books and not in martial arts.

At 15 years of age, Chew became very interested in weight lifting and enrolled for training at a small body building club in Ipoh. Due to his dedication and training, he became the national Malaysian weight lifting champion in both the feather weight and the light weight classes in 1939, 1941 and 1942. During those years he also acquired an interest in martial arts and took up judo, jujitsu and wrestling.

At age 20, Chew was introduced to Karate-Do, during the Japanese occupation of Malaya. He was then contracted by a Japanese military officer, who had seen him in health and strength magazines, to become a personal fitness and weight lifting coach. During one of his scheduled visits, the young Chew discovered the officer practicing movements now known as karate ‘Kata’. The styles of karate practiced by the officer were Keishinkan and Shotokan. Chew was impressed and asked for and got tuition. For more than 2 years afterwards, he and the officer trained together in karate, jujitsu, judo and weight lifting until the Japanese Army officer left for Okinawa in 1945.

After the Second World War, Chew went to Japan and the occupied Okinawa to further his karate training, as well as several trips to Taiwan to learn kung-fu and oriental weapons from a number of old kung-fu Masters of China.

In 1966, at the request of his friends, Chew decided to start a dojo at Petaling Jaya with a small number of students, and Karate Budokan International was founded as a lesser organisation. There was a large amount of interest shown by people who wanted to learn karate, and he found it impossible to cope with the classes without seeking assistants. As there were no other karate instructors in Malaysia, he made two further trips to Tokyo and Osaka and employed seven Japanese instructors as assistants. Classes then spread the art of Budokan karate throughout the Malay Peninsula within two years.

Chew's ambition was to be able to travel to different countries and conduct karate classes when he reached the age of 80. However, he fell ill from a paralytic attack on 4 February 1995 and died, in Malaysia, on 18 July 1997 at the age of 76 years.

== Global expansion ==
Karate Budokan International is now a global association with branches around the world including Australia, India, Germany, Malaysia, Pakistan, Oman, Norway, Sri Lanka, United Arab Emirates, United States of America, Cameroon, Wales and England. The world headquarters for KBI is located in Noosa, Queensland, Australia.
