= Rozhdestvenskoye, Voronezh Oblast =

Rozhdestvenskoye Рождественское
- Selo
- Location within Voronezh Oblast Location within Russia
- Coordinates: 51°14′N 42°10′E
- Country: Russia
- Region: Voronezh Oblast
- District: Povorinsky District
- Time zone: UTC+3:00

Rozhdestvenskoye (Russian: Рождественское) is a rural locality (a selo) and the administrative center of Rozhdestvenskoye Rural Settlement, Povorinsky District, Voronezh Oblast, Russia. The population was 2,645 as of 2010. There are 49 streets.

== Geography ==
Rozhdestvenskoye is located 8 km northwest of Povorino (the district's administrative centre) by road. Povorino is the nearest rural locality.
