= April 1922 =

Month of 1922

<<	April 1922					>>
Su	Mo	Tu	We	Th	Fr	Sa
						1
2	3	4	5	6	7	8
9	10	11	12	13	14	15
16	17	18	19	20	21	22
23	24	25	26	27	28	29
30

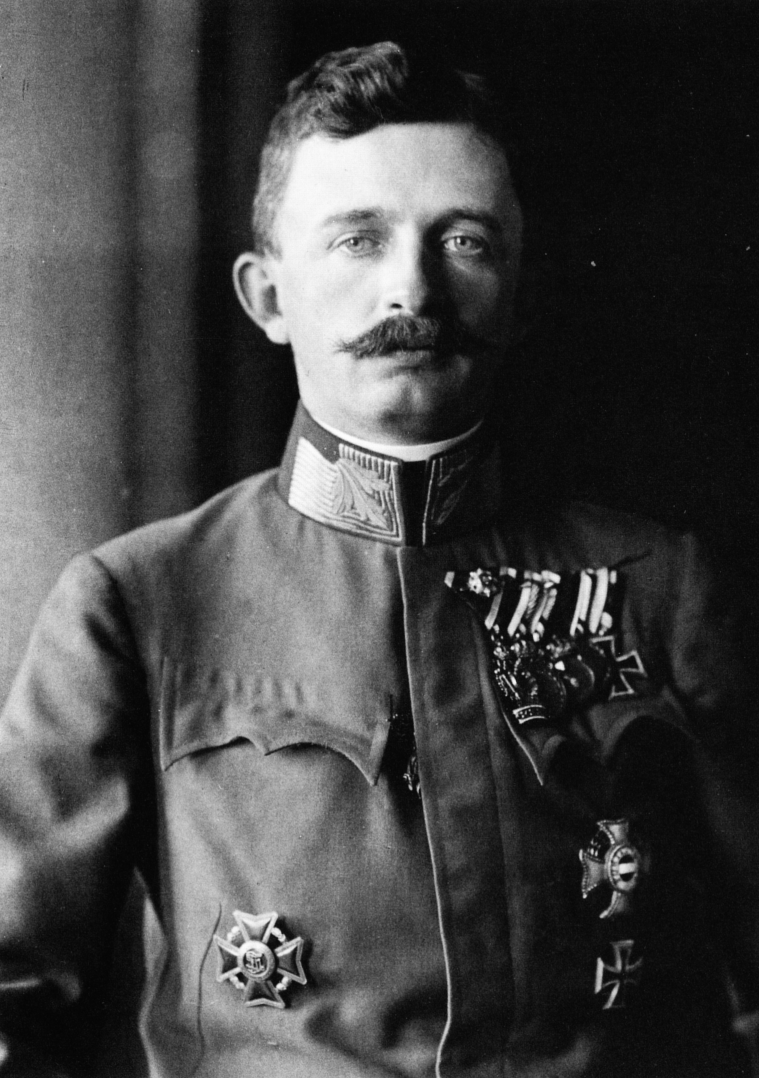
April 1, 1922: Karl the First, the last Emperor of Austria-Hungary, dies in exile

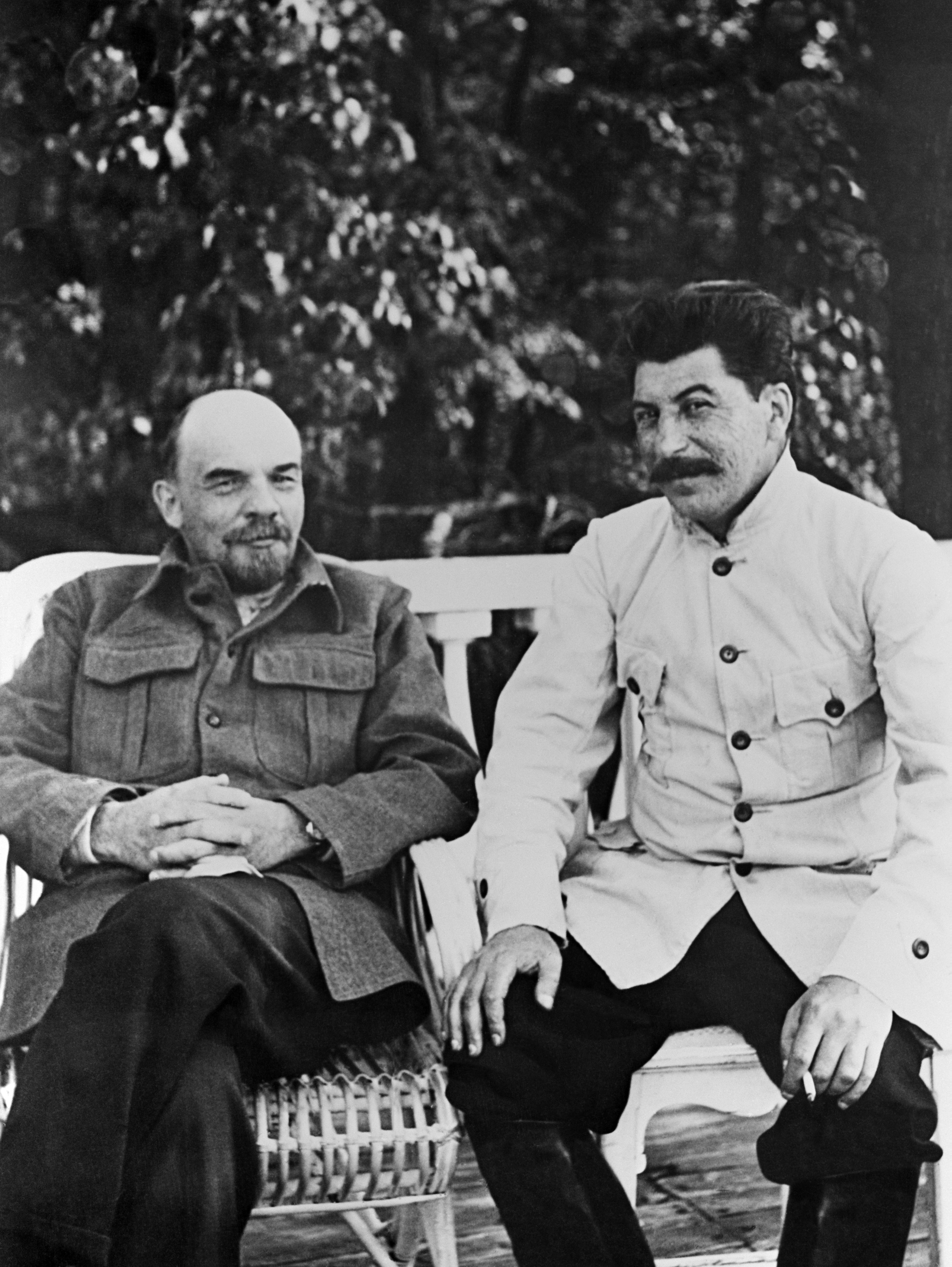
April 3, 1922: Soviet Communist Party leader Vladimir Lenin names Joseph Stalin as his successor

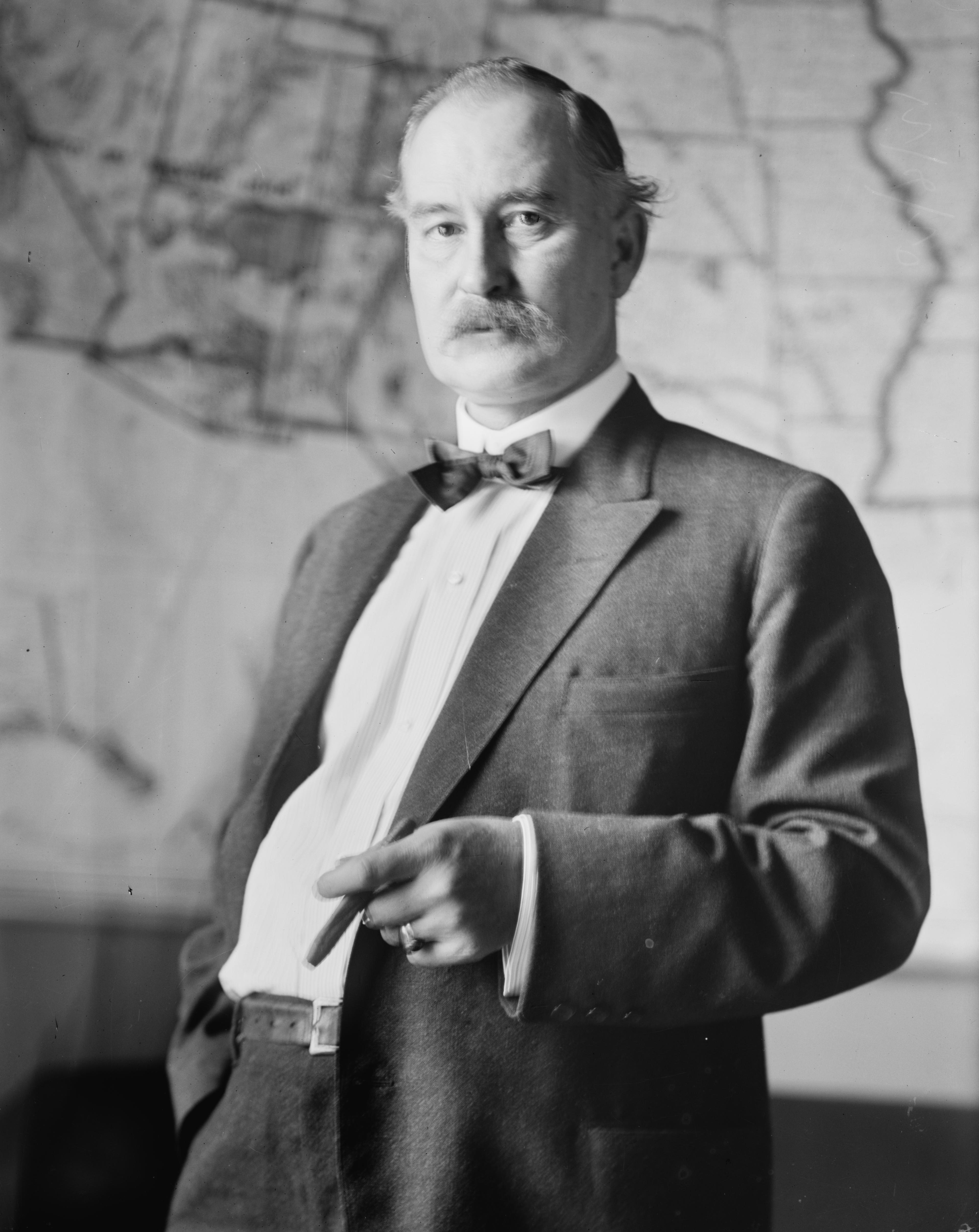
April 14, 1922: U.S. President Harding's Secretary of the Interior, Albert B. Fall, accused of corruption

The following events occurred in April 1922:

== April 1, 1922 (Saturday) ==
- Over 500,000 United Mine Workers of America miners across 26 states went on strike in the United States.
- The British government formally transferred all functions of the former Government of Southern Ireland (which encompassed 26 of the 32 counties of Ireland) to the new Provisional Government by an Order in Council.

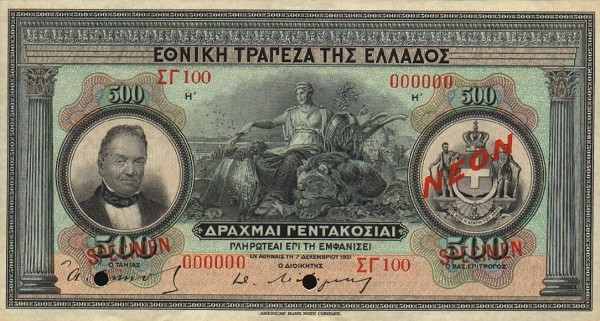
A 500-drachma note to be cut in half. The right half became a 250-drachma bill and the left became a 250-drachma loan to the government.

- In order to alleviate a budget deficit, the government of Greece (led by Prime Minister Dimitrios Gounaris) implemented a program that required the existing Greek drachma banknotes to literally be cut in half, with the side on the right (which had an image of the coat of arms) to be exchanged for new bank notes at half value. The left side of the note had to be surrendered to the bank in exchange for a government bond with a 6.5 percent annual interest rate.
- The Arnon Street killings of five men and a 7-year-old boy were carried out in Belfast in Northern Ireland by a group of police officers in retaliation for the sniper killing of Royal Irish Constable George Turner.
- The University of Cambridge rowing team won the 74th Boat Race.
- Born:
  - Saad el-Shazly, Egyptian military commander who led the Egyptian Armed Forces during the Yom Kippur War; in Basyoun, Kingdom of Egypt (d. 2011)
  - William Manchester, American author, biographer and historian; in Attleboro, Massachusetts (d. 2004)
  - Sonny King, American lounge singer and comedian; as Luigi Schiavone, in Brooklyn (d. 2006)
- Died:
  - Emperor Charles I of Austria, 34, last monarch of the Austro-Hungarian Empire, died of respiratory failure at his home on Madeira Island, where he had lived in exile after the end of World War I (b. 1887)
  - Jane Bunford, 26, British woman who was recognized as the tallest woman in the world in her lifetime, at a height of 7 feet 7 inches (2.31 m), died from complications of gigantism (b. 1895)

== April 2, 1922 (Sunday) ==
- Marcelo T. de Alvear was elected to a six-year term as the new President of Argentina, receiving 50.51% of the popular vote, more than the other five candidates combined. Alvear, who carried 9 of 14 Argentine provinces, received 216 of the 336 electoral votes and was inaugurated on October 12. His Unión Cívica Radical political party won 49 of the 85 contested seats in the Chamber of Deputies to hold 95 of the 158 overall.

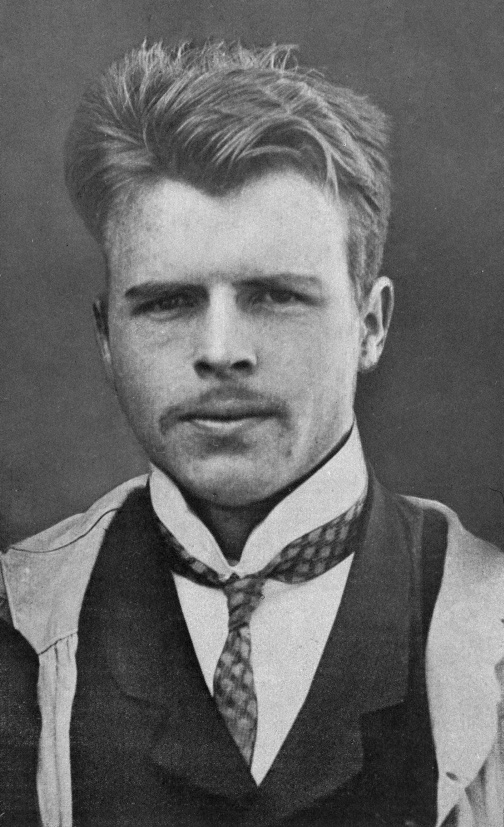
Dr. Hermann Rorschach

- Jews who had immigrated to Palestine established two settlements that are now mid-sized cities in Israel. A group of four Americans from New York state, and five employees, established Ra'anana (which now has 75,000 residents) on land purchased by the Ahuza Company for Jewish Settlement. On the same day, Givatayim (Hebrew for "Two Hills", with a population of 58,000) was established by 22 Russian Jewish immigrants on the hills of Borochov and Kozlovsky.
- The Charlie Chaplin comedy short film Pay Day was released.
- Died: Hermann Rorschach, 37, Swiss psychiatrist and psychoanalyst, best known for developing what would become known as the Rorschach test, died of peritonitis from a ruptured appendix (b. 1884)

== April 3, 1922 (Monday) ==
- On Vladimir Lenin's designation of a successor, Joseph Stalin was made the new General Secretary of the Communist Party in Soviet Russia.
- British Prime Minister David Lloyd George resoundingly won a motion of confidence in the House of Commons, 372 to 94, strengthening his hand going into the Genoa Conference.
- Born:
  - Doris Day, American singer and film star; as Doris Kappelhoff, in Cincinnati (d. 2019)
  - Maurice Riel, Canadian politician, served as a Senator from 1973 to 1999 and Speaker of the Senate of Canada from 1983 to 1984; in Saint-Constant, Quebec (d. 2007)
- Died:
  - Cyrus Northrop, 88, American educator who served as President of the University of Minnesota from 1884 to 1911 (b. 1834)
  - Serapio Calderón, 78, Peruvian statesman who served as interim President of Peru for five months in 1904 after the death of President Manuel Candamo (b. 1843)
  - Aaron Y. Ross, 93, American stagecoach guard and driver for Wells Fargo, known for defending the company from multiple armed robberies, including an 1883 attempt to rob a train of $80,000 in gold bullion (b. 1829)

== April 4, 1922 (Tuesday) ==
- H. V. Kaltenborn became the first person to "broadcast an editorial opinion over the air" when his newspaper, the Brooklyn Daily Eagle, sponsored his appearance on New York City's WVP radio station. Kaltenborn became the first radio commentator, offering news analysis of the ongoing nationwide United Mineworkers of America walkout from the viewpoints "of a miner, a mine owner, and an average citizen" in what he called a "spoken editorial".
- A bomb attack at a dinner for members of Hungary's "Democratic Club" in Budapest killed eight people. All the victims were Jewish, and it was suspected that the attack had been an assassination attempt aimed at the party leadership because of the placement of the explosive. Károly Rassay, the Party's leader, had not yet arrived when the explosion happened.
- The bodies of the six victims of the Hinterkaifeck murders, which had been carried out on March 31, were discovered in a farmhouse near Waidhofen, Bavaria. The case, one of Germany's most gruesome unsolved crimes, would be closed in 1955 without any person having been charged.
- Voters approved the creation of the suburban borough of Paramus, New Jersey by a vote of 238 to 10.
- Born: Elmer Bernstein, American film score composer and conductor; in New York City (d. 2004)
- Died:
  - Sten Lagergren, 45, Swedish chemist, pioneer in the study of adsorption kinetics (b. 1876)
  - Peter Waite, 87, Scottish-born Australian pastoralist, businessman and philanthropist (b. 1834)
  - Paul W. Beck, 45, American military officer and senior member of the U.S. Army Air Service who advocated for an air force separate from control of other branches of the military, was killed by his friend Jean P. Day, a retired Oklahoma Supreme Court judge, whose wife alleged that Beck had made sexual advances towards her (b. 1876)

== April 5, 1922 (Wednesday) ==
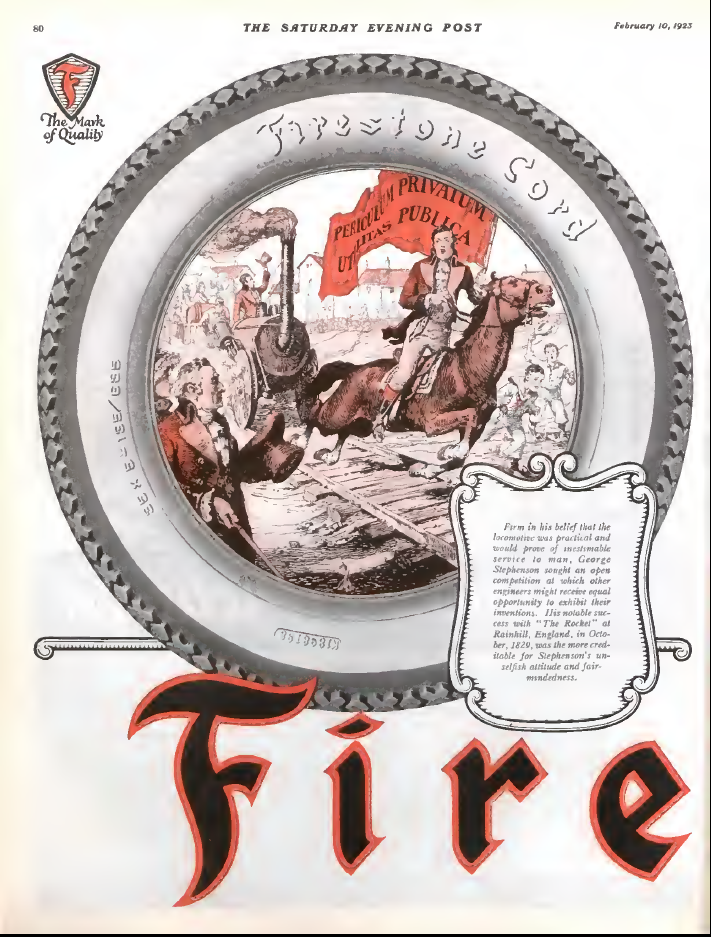
A 1923 advertisement for the next-generation Firestone tire

- Firestone Tire and Rubber Company introduced the "balloon tire", a thicker but more flexible tire that required less air pressure for full inflation, could hold more weight and was more durable. The "Firestone Balloon" was also thick enough to be the first to have visible lettering in raised letters on the tire itself.
- The Original Celtics, based in New York City, won the championship playoff of the premier professional basketball circuit in the U.S. at that time, the Eastern Basketball League, by defeating the Trenton (New Jersey) Potters, 27–22, in a game at Camden, New Jersey to win the tie-breaking game of the best-of-three series.
- KOB in Las Cruces, New Mexico went on the air, the first radio station in that state.
- Born:
  - Tom Finney, English football star and outside left end for the English national football team in 76 international games; in Preston, Lancashire (d. 2014)
  - Gale Storm, American television actress and singer; as Josephine Cottle, in Bloomington, Texas (d. 2009)
- Died:
  - Pandita Ramabai, 63, Indian women's rights activist (b. 1858)
  - John H. Murphy Sr., 81, African American newspaper publisher, founder of the Baltimore Afro-American (b. 1840)
  - Frederic Villiers, 70, British war artist and war correspondent (b. 1851)

== April 6, 1922 (Thursday) ==
- The territory of the former Republic of Central Lithuania was incorporated by annexation into Poland and renamed "Wilno Land" (Ziemia Wileńska). It included Vilnius, the former and future capital of the nation of Lithuania.
- The Reichstag approved a bill allowing women to serve on juries as lay judges (jurors).
- At an auction in Paris, the rarest postage stamp in the world, the British Guiana 1c magenta was sold for a record high price to a representative of Arthur Hind who paid over $32,000. A "Mr. Griebert" ("unknown among the great gathering of philatelists") made the winning bid of 300,000 French francs, and paid an additional 17.5% tax of 52,500 francs.
- Died: Arabella Goddard, 86, English concert pianist who toured the world in the 1870s (b. 1836)

== April 7, 1922 (Friday) ==
- The first midair collision between an airliner and another airplane occurred, over Picardie in France. A Grands Express Aériens Farman F.60, designated as "Goliath" and carrying five people (two crew and three passengers) collided with a Daimler Airway de Havilland DH.18 that was carrying mail, as both were flying at an altitude of 500 feet (150 m). All seven people aboard the two planes were killed. Only five days earlier, Grands Express had inaugurated its passenger service between London and Paris and was making the flight from Paris–Le Bourget Airport to Croydon Aerodrome, while Daimler was approaching Paris on its flight from London.

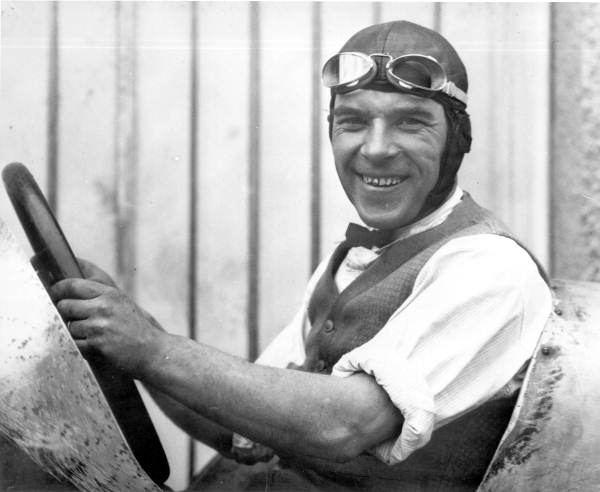
Haugdahl

- Sprint car driver Sig Haugdahl and officials of the International Motor Contest Association (IMCA) reported that he had broken the record for fastest speed on land and had reached 180 miles per hour (290 km/h) that day while driving a 250 hp car at the Daytona Beach Road Course in Florida. The claim of a new record had not been timed by the American Automobile Association and was not accepted because it was unverifiable. Remarkably, Haugdahl's claimed speed of 180 mph was 45% faster than the official record of 124.09 miles per hour (199.70 km/h) set by Lydston Hornsted on June 24, 1914, in a 200 hp car.
- Morton F.C. (now Greenock Morton) won soccer football's Scottish Cup, defeating Rangers at Hampden Park before a crowd of 75,000 in Glasgow.
- Born:
  - Stan Polley, American entertainment manager later convicted of defrauding numerous clients; in New York City (d. 2009)
  - Mongo Santamaría, Cuban jazz percussionist; as Ramón Santamaría Rodríguez, in Havana (d. 2003)
- Died: A. V. Dicey, 87, British jurist and constitutional scholar whose 1885 treatise Introduction to the Study of the Law of the Constitution is still relied upon by courts as part of the uncodified British Constitution (b. 1835)

== April 8, 1922 (Saturday) ==
- During an exhibition game, the St. Louis Cardinals baseball team first wore their now-iconic uniforms, with two cardinals perched on a baseball bat emblazoned across the front of the jersey.
- An early morning series of tornadoes killed 15 people in Texas and two in Oklahoma, as well as injuring 80 others. Hardest hit were the towns of Ballinger and Oplin, Texas.
- Died: Erich von Falkenhayn, 60, German general who served as Chief of the German General Staff from the beginning of World War I until August 29, 1916, after setbacks in the Battle of Verdun and the Battle of the Somme ruined his pledge to win the war by 1917 (b. 1861)

== April 9, 1922 (Sunday) ==
- Sir Arthur Conan Doyle arrived in the United States to conduct a lecture tour on spiritualism. Arriving in New York from Liverpool on the White Star liner Baltic, he told the press, "I know absolutely what I am going to get after death— happiness. It is not mere hearsay. I have talked with and seen 20 of my dead, including my son, when my wife and other witnesses were present."
- Eleven French soldiers were killed by a bomb blast while searching for weapons as part of the Inter-Allied Commission occupation of Upper Silesia. The blast, which injured another 10 people near the city of Gleiwitz (now Gliwice in Poland), took place after French military authorities were informed that weapons and munitions had been buried in a graveyard near the Huetten Smelting Works.
- Charles Lindbergh took his first airplane flight, as a passenger in a Standard J biplane on his first flying lesson. Flight instructor Otto Timm of the Nebraska Aircraft Corporation's flying school piloted the airplane from an airfield in Lincoln, Nebraska.
- Died:
  - Hans Fruhstorfer, 56, German explorer and entomologist (b. 1866)
  - Patrick Manson, 77, Scottish physician (b. 1844)

== April 10, 1922 (Monday) ==
- The Genoa Conference began. Representatives of 34 countries convened to discuss global economic problems in the aftermath of the war. The conference also marked the first appearance of Soviet Russia as a player on the international stage. It was widely speculated that Vladimir Lenin might personally attend, but he chose not to for security reasons. Foreign Minister Georgy Chicherin appeared on behalf of Russia's Bolshevik regime in hopes of getting recognition of his government from the West.
- The First Zhili–Fengtian War began in China between two rival political groups, each with more than 100,000 troops, who were fighting for control of Beijing.
- Haiti's State Council, which had been allowed to control domestic affairs of the Caribbean nation during the United States occupation of Haiti that began in 1915, surprised the U.S. administration by selecting Louis Borno to become the next President of Haiti, effective May 15.
- The U.S. Supreme Court decided Balzac v. Porto Rico and held unanimously that although citizens of Puerto Rico were United States citizens pursuant to the Jones Act of 1917, the right to a trial by jury (guaranteed in the Sixth Amendment to the Bill of Rights) did not extend to United States territories that had not been admitted into the Union as states.
- The first licensed radio station in the U.S. state of North Carolina, WBT out of Charlotte, went on the air.

== April 11, 1922 (Tuesday) ==
- The New York Philharmonic orchestra made its first recording, an abridged performance of Beethoven's 8-minute-long Coriolan Overture, for a 5-minute, 12-inch 78 rpm phonograph record disc for the Victor Talking Machine Company (later acquired by the RCA company and called RCA Victor).
- The passenger steamship S.S. Leviathan, which had been launched from Germany as the Hamburg—American Line luxury liner S.S. Vaterland before being seized by the United States when the U.S. entered World War I, was renamed the S.S. "President Harding" by vote of the United States Shipping Board while ship was in dry dock to be refurbished. Board Chairman Albert Lasker said that the new name had been selected at the urging of two other shipping commissioners, both Democrats, who said that incumbent President Warren G. Harding "had done more than any other one man" to build the United States Merchant Marine fleet. On May 15, President Harding wrote to Chairman Lasker and said that "As I understand it, the board has decided to change the names of twenty-two vessels and name them after Presidents of the Republic. Let me express to the board my hearty concurrence in the action, except as it relates to one ship." While Harding described the naming of the vessel in his honor as "very considerate", "a fine compliment" and "most agreeable", he asked "that the name of the Leviathan remain unchanged."

== April 12, 1922 (Wednesday) ==
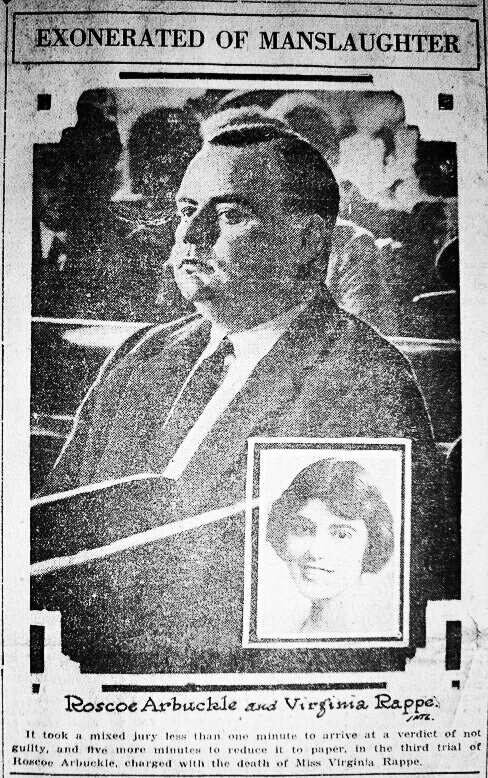
A photo of the verdict

- Fatty Arbuckle was acquitted of all criminal charges in his third trial for the death of Virginia Rappe. The jury deliberated for only one minute.
- Born: Simon Kapwepwe, Zambian politician, served as Vice-President of Zambia from 1967 to 1970; in Chinsali, Northern Rhodesia (present-day Zambia) (d. 1980)

== April 13, 1922 (Thursday) ==
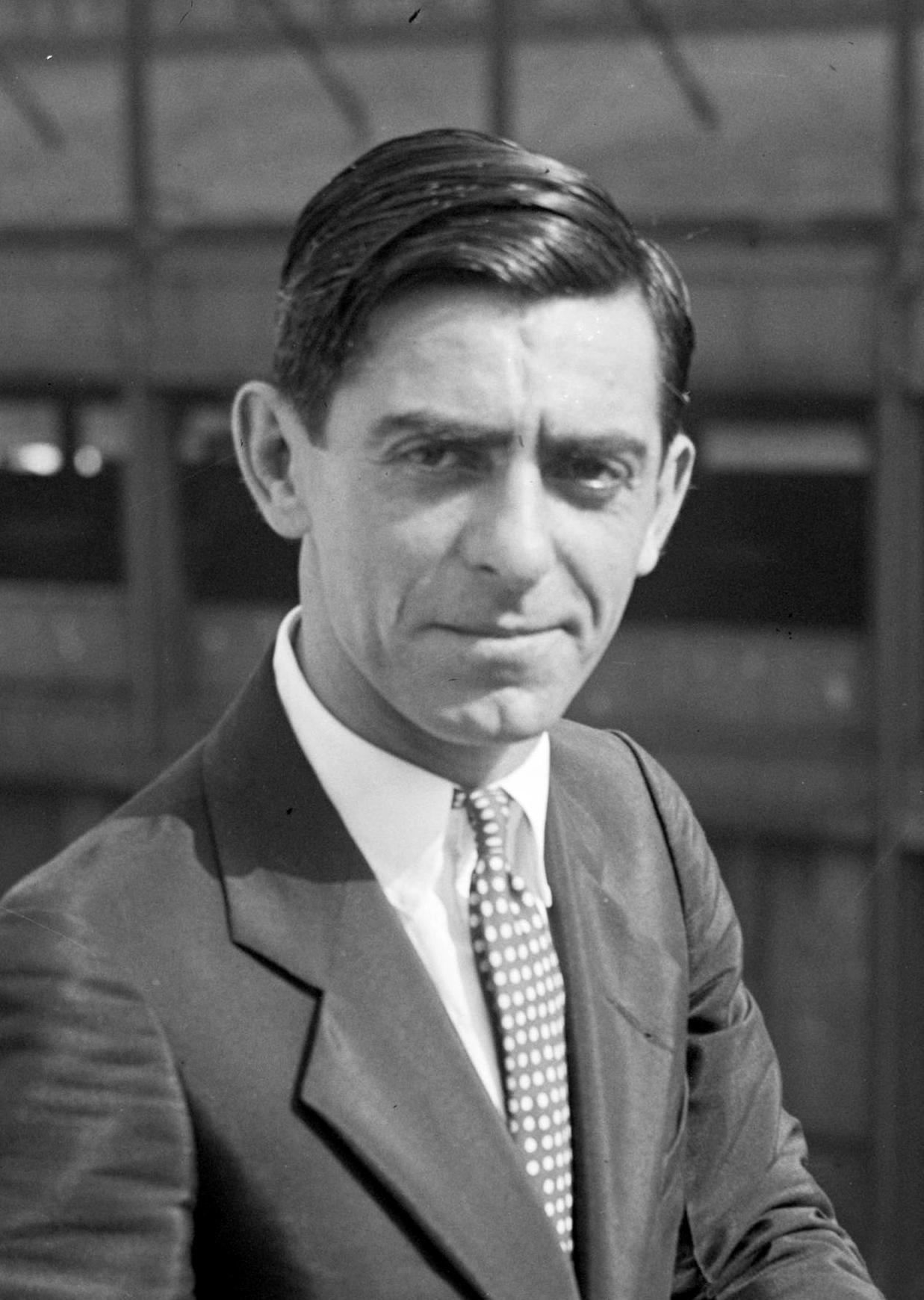
Cantor

- The musical revue Make It Snappy starring Eddie Cantor and introducing the hit song "Yes! We Have No Bananas", premiered at the Winter Garden Theatre on Broadway.
- The U.S. state of Massachusetts allowed women to be eligible to hold all public offices.
- Born: Julius Nyerere, Tanzanian politician, served as the first President of Tanzania from 1964 to 1985; as Kambarage Nyerere, in Butiama, Tanganyika (present-day Tanzania)(d. 1999)
- Died: Sir Ross Macpherson Smith, 29, Australian aviator who made the first flight from England to Australia with his brother Sir Keith Macpherson Smith in 1919, was killed in a plane crash along with his mechanic, Lieutenant James Mallett Bennett, 28, while testing the Vickers Viking amphibious plane that he planned to fly around the world with. They had flown for 15 minutes when they experienced trouble while banking to make a turn and went into a nose dive from an altitude of 1,500 feet (460 m) (b. 1892)

== April 14, 1922 (Friday) ==
- The Teapot Dome scandal broke when The Wall Street Journal reported that U.S. Secretary of the Interior Albert B. Fall had secretly leased the government-owned Teapot Dome oil reserves in Wyoming to a subsidiary of Sinclair Consolidated Oil Corporation.
- A group of 300 members of the IRA, led by Rory O'Connor, occupied the Four Courts and an adjacent hotel in Dublin. Striking shortly after midnight, the group scaled the walls while the three policemen on duty were diverted by a small group of IRA scouts. By daybreak, the building housing Dublin's four criminal and civil courts of law had been fortified and the invaders "commandeered large supplies of bread and meat" from various factories. While Irish Free State police took possession of the county jail in defense, the IRA forces had control of the Victoria Hotel, the Court House, Dublin's Town Hall, the post office, the police barracks and other buildings in preparation of a long siege. The army of the Irish Free State would forcefully retake the Courts complex in a four-day siege in June.
- The government of Italy announced the results of its 1921 national census, showing a population of 38,835,184 people as of December 1, 1921. The government added that the number represented of residents present in Italy, and that if permanent residents who had been out of the country at the time had been counted, the number would have been 40,078,161.
- Born: Ali Akbar Khan, Hindustani classical musician; in Comilla, East Bengal, British India (present-day Bangladesh)(d. 2009)
- Died: Cap Anson, 69, American Major League Baseball first baseman who was the National League's leader for runs batted in (RBI) for eight of twelve seasons, and NL batting champion in two other seasons, later inducted into the National Baseball Hall of Fame (b. 1852)

== April 15, 1922 (Saturday) ==
- The U.S. Senate passed Resolution 277, which asked Interior Secretary Albert Fall and Navy Secretary Edwin Denby to confirm or deny reports that leases on the government-owned oil reserves had been granted without notice.
- Born:
  - Harold Washington, American lawyer and politician, the first African American Mayor of Chicago (1983–1987); in Chicago, Illinois (d. 1987)
  - Donn F. Draeger, American martial artist who popularized judo in the United States after World War II; as Donald Draeger, in Milwaukee, Wisconsin (d. 1982)
- Died: John D'Auban, 79, English dancer, choreographer and actor, known for staging the dance sequences in most of the original Gilbert and Sullivan operas in the 19th century (b. 1842)

== April 16, 1922 (Sunday) ==
- The Treaty of Rapallo was signed at the city of Rapallo in Italy by German Foreign Minister Walther Rathenau and Russian Foreign Minister Georgy Chicherin. Germany and Russia agreed to renounce all territorial and financial claims against each other and normalize diplomatic relations. Both Foreign Ministers had been in Italy to participate in the 34-nation Genoa Conference and had secretly agreed to meet separately at the nearby resort town 17 miles (27 km) east of Genoa. After ratification of the treaty by both nations, a supplementary agreement would be signed in Berlin on November 5, 1923, after the formation of the Soviet Union, to cover Germany's relations with the other USSR constituent republics.

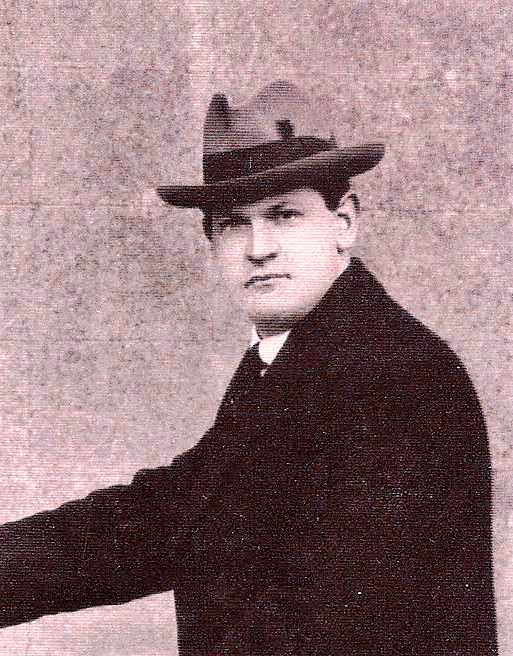
Collins

- Irish Free State leader Michael Collins survived an assassination attempt when gunmen fired at him as he was passing through Dublin's Rutland Square. According to Collins, he and his associates had returned to Dublin from the town of Naas in County Kildare where he had addressed a meeting earlier in the day, and the four car group had arrived at Vaughn's Hotel when they saw a group of 12 men emerge from a house ahead. Nobody in the group recognized Collins and walked past him, then began firing guns at the men in the cars. Collins then drew his own revolver and fired at the attackers from behind. He said later that he was almost shot by a gunman "but fortunately he did not me." He disarmed the youth at gunpoint. "I asked him if he knew who I was, and when he replied 'No,' I told him.... That seemed to make him more uncomfortable then ever." Collins's luck would run out on August 22, with his death in a gunbattle with assassins in County Cork.
- Born:
  - Sir Kingsley Amis, English novelist; in Clapham, London (d. 1995)
  - Leo Tindemans, Belgian politician, served as Prime Minister of Belgium from 1974 to 1978; as Leonard Tindemans, in Zwijndrecht (d. 2014)
- Died: Frank Lawless, 51, Irish revolutionary and politician, member of Dáil Éireann from 1918 to 1922, died from injuries sustained in an accident where the horse-drawn carriage he was riding overturned (b. 1870)

== April 17, 1922 (Monday) ==
- Cemal Azmi, who had carried out the Armenian genocide while he was serving as the Ottoman Empire's Governor of the Trebizond Province, was shot to death along with his former chief adviser, Bahaeddin Şakir, while both of them were walking on Uhlandstrasse in Berlin, by two former Armenian residents of Turkey, as part of Operation Nemesis. Arshavir Shirakian, who had carried out the vengeance killing of former Ottoman Grand Vizier Said Halim Pasha in Rome on December 6, shot and killed Azmi. Şakir attempted to run away but he was stopped and killed by Aram Yerganian.
- Tornadoes swept through the U.S. states of Illinois, Indiana and Ohio, killing about 50 people. The community of Hedrick, Indiana suffered nine deaths and 100 injuries.
- In Paris, the two rival monarchist claimants from the House of Braganza to the throne of Portugal agreed to a truce. The former king, Manuel II (who had been deposed in 1910 when Portugal became a republic), entered into an agreement with Duarte Nuno de Bragança, the grandson of King Miguel I (who was deposed in 1834), unifying the monarchist movement that had been divided between Manuel's "Constitutionalist" branch and Duarte's "Miguelist" branch. Duarte agreed to support Manuel if the monarchy was restored, and Manuel agreed that upon his death, Duarte would be his successor as head of the royal house of Portugal. The agreement would be a moot point, in that the Portugal's monarchy was never restored. The pretender to the throne, who would have been "King Duarte III" from 1932 to 1976, would be allowed to return to Portugal to live in 1952 and to keep the royal residence in Coimbra, the Palácio de São Marcos.
- Portuguese aviator Sacadura Cabral and navigator Gago Coutinho lost their trouble-plagued Fairey III seaplane, the Lusitânia, as they continued their attempt to make the first aerial crossing of the South Atlantic, after having started from Portugal on March 30 en route to Brazil. After having layovers of six days and twelve days for repairs, they departed from the Portuguese-ruled São Vicente Island off of West Africa and as they approached Brazilian territory, Brazil's Saint Paul Rocks, lost one of the floats from the Lusitânia and had to abandon their aircraft, which sank in the sea. Rescued, they were transported to the Brazilian island of Fernando de Noronha. Portugal's Navy provided a second Fairey III seaplane, the Patria, for them and on May 12 they would attempt to fly back to Saint Paul Rocks to resume their journey, and be forced to ditch in the South Atlantic again. Ultimately, the Portuguese duo would arrive in Rio in a different airplane on June 17.
- Born: Raphael I Bidawid, Iraqi Assyrian priest, Patriarch of the Chaldean Catholic Church from 1989 until his death in 2003; in Mosul, Mandatory Iraq (d. 2003)
- Died: Luke Kennedy, chief hit-man for the Hogan Gang of organized criminals in St. Louis, was shot to death near Wellston, Missouri by members of Egan's Rats.

== April 18, 1922 (Tuesday) ==
- In Yugoslavia, 400 or more people in Serbia were killed in the explosion of a large stockpile of munitions near a railway station in Monastir. According to the Associated Press, a stockpile of 400 carloads of ammunition and explosives had been stored near the town's passenger railway station when it exploded at around noon; the blast destroyed an army barracks where 1,800 soldiers were at a dining hall, and collapsed a church where school children were attending a worship service.
- The Republic of Central Lithuania was formally incorporated under the sovereignty of Poland despite Lithuania's objections.
- Economist John Maynard Keynes wrote an editorial urging Britain to give Russia a loan of £150 million to be spent on British goods that either promoted agricultural production or improved communications. Doing so, Keynes wrote, would ameliorate Russia's famine and cut food prices worldwide by speeding up the time it would take to make Russia an exporter of food again.
- Actor William Desmond was badly injured in a fall during the shooting of a scene for the film serial Perils of the Yukon. He and others were standing on a 50-foot cliff when a ledge of melting ice and snow gave way, plunging Williams into the river below. Desmond, 44, recovered and would appear in films until shortly before his death in 1949.
- FC Spartak Moscow, the most successful soccer football team in the Soviet Union and later of Russia, played its very first game, initially as an independent team (not affiliated with the Communist regime) created as "Moscow Sports Circle" (MKS) by a group of athletes from the Moscow district of Presnja. After renaming itself Krasnaja Presnja, it fell under the control of the Communist Party youth organization Komsomol and would eventually be named Spartak in 1935 as part of the Spartak athletic society. In that first match, an exhibition game or "friendly", MKC defeated the six-time Moscow champions, Zamoskvoretskii Klub Sporta, 3 to 2.
- The borough of New Milford, New Jersey, was created by voters in a referendum. It had a population of more than 19,000 people fifty years later, and then had a gradual decline.
- Born:
  - Alina Margolis-Edelman, Polish physician, Holocaust survivor, and co-founder of the charitable society Médecins du Monde (Doctors of the World); in Łódź (d. 2008)
  - Homer R. Warner, American cardiologist and pioneer in medical informatics, the application of computers to the practice of medicine; in Salt Lake City (d. 2012)
  - Paulo Nogueira Neto, Brazilian environmentalist, served as Brazil's first Secretary of the Environment; in São Paulo, Brazil (d. 2019)
  - Hilarie Lindsay, Australian writer and toy manufacturer, known for her Mr & Mrs Poppleberry series of children's books, served as the first female president of the Toys and Games Manufacturers' Association of Australia; in Sydney, Australia (d. 2021)

== April 19, 1922 (Wednesday) ==
- All 21 people on the Canadian ship Lambton were killed in a gale that struck Whitefish Bay on Lake Superior. The Lambton, with a crew of 16, had been transporting five replacement lighthouse keepers for Ile Parisienne, Michipicoten Island and Caribou Island.
- PEN America was founded by writers in New York City (including Willa Cather, Eugene O'Neill, Robert Frost, Ellen Glasgow, Edwin Arlington Robinson, Robert Benchley and its first president, Booth Tarkington). PEN America subscribes to the principles outlined in the PEN International Charter. The organization (whose acronym stood for "Poets, Essayists, Novelists") was created after British writers (including Catherine Amy Dawson Scott, John Galsworthy, Joseph Conrad, Elizabeth Craig, George Bernard Shaw and H. G. Wells) created the original P.E.N. Club in London six months earlier.
- The name of the new United Kingdom police force in Northern Ireland was announced as the Royal Ulster Constabulary (R.U.C.), replacing the Royal Irish Constabulary, with the transition to take effect on June 1.
- Clarence DeMar won the Boston Marathon.
- Born: Erich Hartmann, German ace fighter pilot during World War II; in Weissach, Weimar Republic (d. 1993)

== April 20, 1922 (Thursday) ==
- Full diplomatic relations were restored between the United States and Germany for the first time since World War I as Alanson B. Houghton arrived at the Potsdam station near Berlin to take up residence as the newly confirmed U.S. Ambassador to Germany.
- The British freighter Zero collided with the USS Aeolus off the coast of Uruguay and sank, but all 18 of its crew were rescued.
- C. E. Ruthenberg, the founder of the Communist Party of America, was released from the New York State Penitentiary, a maximum security prison in Dannemora, after serving three and a half years of a five-year sentence, along with an associate, Isaac Ferguson.
- Born:
  - M. S. Ramaiah, Indian civil engineer, construction company owner and philanthropist, established the Gokula Education Foundation and founded the M. S. Ramaiah Institute of Technology in Bangalore; in Madhugiri, Mysore princely state, British India (present-day Karnataka state) (d. 1997)
  - Morena Celarié, Salvadoran folk dancer and dance troupe choreographer; in San Salvador, El Salvador (d. 1972)
- Died: Christopher Augustine Buckley, 76, blind American saloonkeeper and Democratic Party political boss in San Francisco during the late 19th century (b. 1845)

== April 21, 1922 (Friday) ==
- France threatened to quit the Genoa Conference because it viewed the Treaty of Rapallo as a provocation and disapproved of David Lloyd George's inclination towards forgiving some of Russia's debt, since much of it was owed to France.
- Six more people were killed in disturbances in Belfast.
- Born:
  - Alistair MacLean, Scottish novelist, known for The Guns of Navarone and other bestsellers; in Shettleston, Glasgow(d. 1987)
  - Stanislav Rostotsky, Soviet Russian film director, known for The Dawns Here Are Quiet; in Rybinsk, Russian SFSR Soviet Union (d. 2001)
  - Bill Orban, Canadian physical fitness trainer, known for creating the 5BX and XBX exercise regimens in the 1950s; in Regina, Saskatchewan (d. 2003)
- Died: Charles Arling, 46, Canadian silent film star, died of pneumonia (b. 1875)

== April 22, 1922 (Saturday) ==
- A Ku Klux Klan raid occurred in Inglewood, California, when 37 Klansmen attacked the home of a Spanish-American family suspected of bootlegging. The violent incident led to a much-publicized trial, where the defendants would be acquitted of all charges.
- The American Birth Control League was incorporated in the U.S. state of New York by Margaret Sanger, with offices at 104 Fifth Avenue in Manhattan.
- Born:
  - Charles Mingus, American jazz musician; in Nogales, Arizona (d. 1979)
  - Richard Diebenkorn, American painter; in Portland, Oregon (d. 1993)

== April 23, 1922 (Sunday) ==
- Ten of the nations at the Genoa Conference placated France by sending Germany a note stating that they reserved the right to nullify any clauses in the Treaty of Rapallo that they recognized as conflicting with the Treaty of Versailles.
- Born: Marjorie Cameron, 73, artist, poet, actress, and occultist; in Belle Plaine, Iowa (d. 1995)
- Died: Peter Cushman Jones, 84, American financier who served as the last Minister of Finance for the Kingdom of Hawaii, co-founded the Bank of Hawaii in 1897 (b. 1837)

== April 24, 1922 (Monday) ==
- The first link in the Imperial Wireless Chain, a network of British Empire radio transmission stations, began service, connecting Leafield (in England) to Cairo (in Egypt). The worldwide network would be completed by 1928.
- A twenty-four-hour general strike called by the Labour Party was held in Ireland to express opposition to the prospect of civil war.
- French Prime Minister Raymond Poincaré warned in a speech that France would, if necessary, act alone to enforce the Treaty of Versailles if the Germans defaulted in their reparations payments.
- Vladimir Lenin had the bullet removed from his shoulder that had been lodged there since 1918 when Fanny Kaplan attempted to assassinate him. His health was officially pronounced as satisfactory.
- Born: Susanna Agnelli, Italian politician and Minister of Foreign Affairs; in Turin, Kingdom of Italy (d. 2009)
- Died: Colin Campbell Ross, 29, Australian saloon owner who had been wrongfully convicted of the murder of a 12-year-old girl, was hanged at the Melbourne Gaol (b. 1892). On May 27, 2008, more than 86 years after his death, he would be posthumously pardoned by the Governor of Victoria for the unjust conviction.

== April 25, 1922 (Tuesday) ==
- Russia responded to the Genoa Conference note of two days earlier, by sending a note of its own to Poland, saying that "in no case can it permit treaties concluded by Russia to depend for their legality on the action of powers not signatory."
- Voters approved the incorporation of Moorestown, New Jersey, a suburb of Philadelphia, in a special referendum authorized by the New Jersey state legislature.
- Died: Frederick Van Rensselaer Dey, 61, American dime novelist and pulp fiction author who wrote 1,076 "Nick Carter" detective stories and paperback novels from 1890 until his death, committed suicide. (b. 1861)

== April 26, 1922 (Wednesday) ==
- The Dunmanway killings began in County Cork, Ireland, with 13 Protestant men and boys being murdered over a period of three days. The first victims were magistrate Thomas Hornibrook, his son Samuel Hornibrook, and his nephew Herbert Woods. Ten more people were killed over the next two days.
- Sixty people were killed, and 100 injured, in a fire in Málaga in Spain that swept through the crowded Aduana, the customs house for international travelers arriving by ship at the port.
- Died:
  - William R. D. Blackwood, 83, Irish-born American surgeon who was awarded the Medal of Honor for his heroism in rescuing severely wounded officers and soldiers at the Third Battle of Petersburg during the American Civil War (b. 1838)
  - Martha "Pat" Kelly, 49, Welsh mountain climber, died from head injuries sustained on April 17 while climbing the Tryfan mountain. (b. 1873)
  - John Simon Guggenheim, 17, son of U.S. Senator Simon Guggenheim, namesake of the Guggenheim Fellowship, died of pneumonia and complications of mastoiditis. (b. 1905)

== April 27, 1922 (Thursday) ==
- Eighty-two coal miners were killed in a fiery underground explosion at the Aurelia Mine of the Uricani Coal Company in Romania. According to investigators, 32 of the men had been burned beyond recognition.

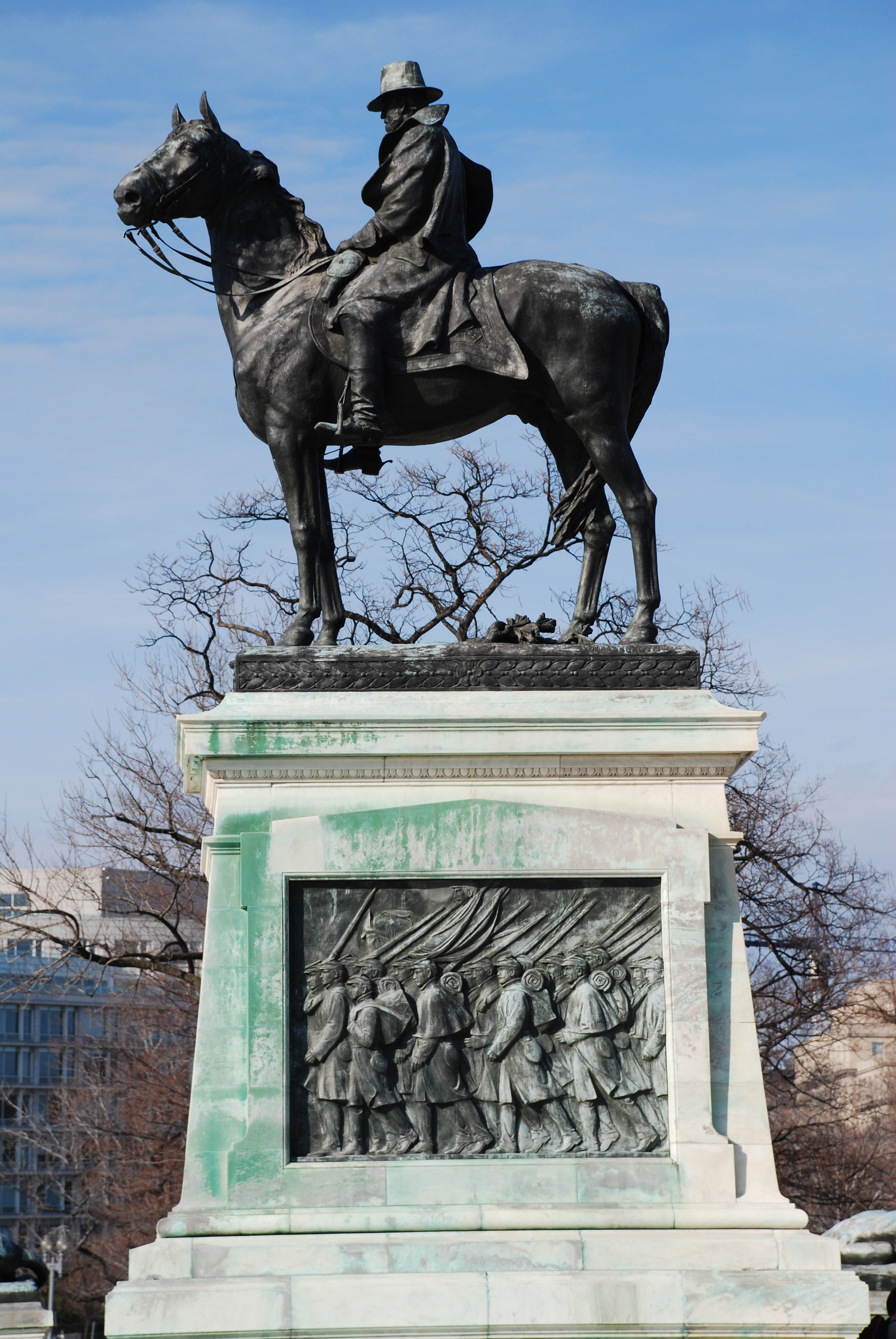
Grant Memorial

Kingdom of Egypt flag

The current Arab Republic of Egypt flag

- The Ulysses S. Grant Memorial was dedicated in Washington, D.C., on the occasion of the 100th anniversary of Ulysses S. Grant's birthday.
- The Russian Soviet Federated Socialist Republic (RSFSR) created the Yakut Autonomous Soviet Socialist Republic.
- The Kingdom of Egypt unveiled a new national flag, consisting of a green background with a white crescent and three stars.
- Josef Ospelt, who had become the first Prime Minister of Liechtenstein on October 5, 1921, announced his resignation and was replaced b Gustav Schädler on June 6.
- Born:
  - Jack Klugman, American TV actor and three-time Emmy Award winner, known for Quincy, M.E. and The Odd Couple; in Philadelphia (d. 2012)
  - Fritz Moravec, Austrian mountaineer, first person to ascend the Gasherbrum II in 1956; in Favoriten District, Vienna (d. 1997)
  - Brian Stewart, Scottish diplomat, served as the Assistant Chief of Britain's Secret Intelligence Service from 1974 to 1979; in Edinburgh (d. 2015)
- Died: William Henry Harrison Stowell, 81, U.S. Congressman, merchant, and industrialist (b. 1840)

== April 28, 1922 (Friday) ==
- Flooding left 12,000 people homeless in the U.S. states of Mississippi and Louisiana.

== April 29, 1922 (Saturday) ==
- Zhang Zuolin, commander of the Fengtian clique in the war for control of Beijing, commenced an ultimately disastrous attack against the rival Zhili clique led by Wu Peifu.
- Huddersfield Town defeated Preston North End, 1–0 in the FA Cup Final at Stamford Bridge.
- Rochdale Hornets beat Hull F.C., 10–9, to win the Challenge Cup of rugby.
- Born:
  - Hans Frei, German-born American biblical scholar and theologian; in Breslau, Lower Silesia, Germany (present-day Wrocław, Poland) (d. 1988)
  - Toots Thielemans, Belgian jazz musician known for his harmonica performances; as Jean-Baptiste Frédéric Isidor, in Brussels (d. 2016)

== April 30, 1922 (Sunday) ==
- Charlie Robertson pitched major league baseball's first perfect game in more than 13 years, in a 2–0 win for his Chicago White Sox over the Detroit Tigers at Navin Field in Detroit. Another perfect game"—one in which no opposing player reaches first base by any means in a game lasting at least nine innings—would not take place again until 34 years later.
- Died: James W. McAndrew, 59, American officer in the U.S. Army who served as Chief of Staff of the American Expeditionary Forces during World War I (b. 1862)
