= March 1922 =

Month of 1922

| << | March 1922 | | | | | >> |
| Su | Mo | Tu | We | Th | Fr | Sa |
| | | | 1 | 2 | 3 | 4 |
| 5 | 6 | 7 | 8 | 9 | 10 | 11 |
| 12 | 13 | 14 | 15 | 16 | 17 | 18 |
| 19 | 20 | 21 | 22 | 23 | 24 | 25 |
| 26 | 27 | 28 | 29 | 30 | 31 |

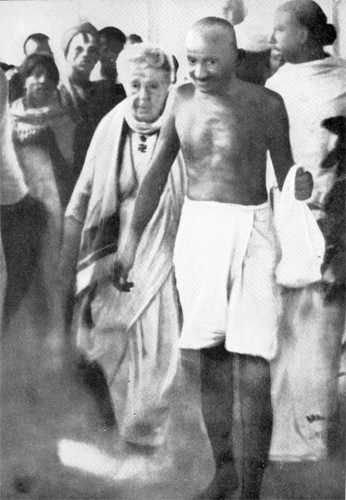
March 10, 1922: British Indian authorities arrest the Mahatma Gandhi, sentence him to six years in prison for sedition.

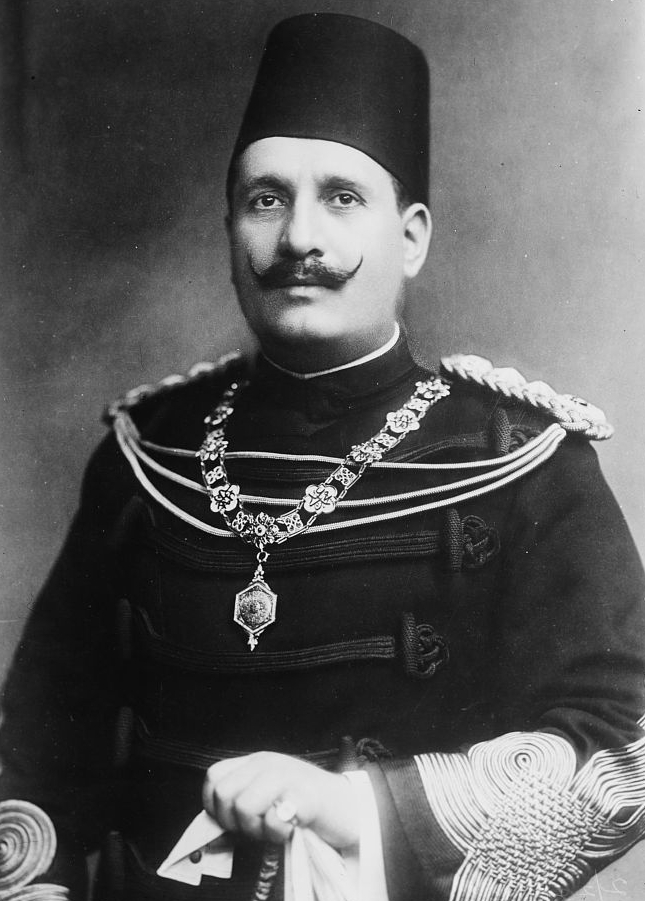
March 16, 1922: Sultan Fuad al-Awal of Egypt becomes the first King of Egypt following British unilateral declaration.

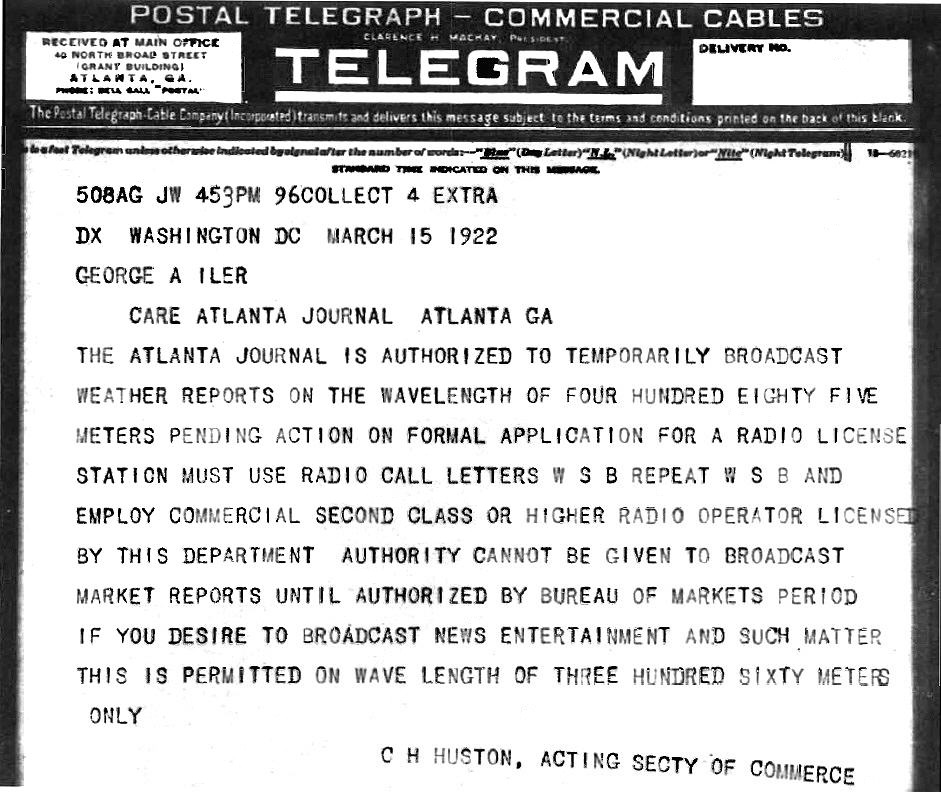
March 5—31, 1922: Nine U.S. states get their first radio stations

The following events occurred in March 1922:

== March 1, 1922 (Wednesday) ==
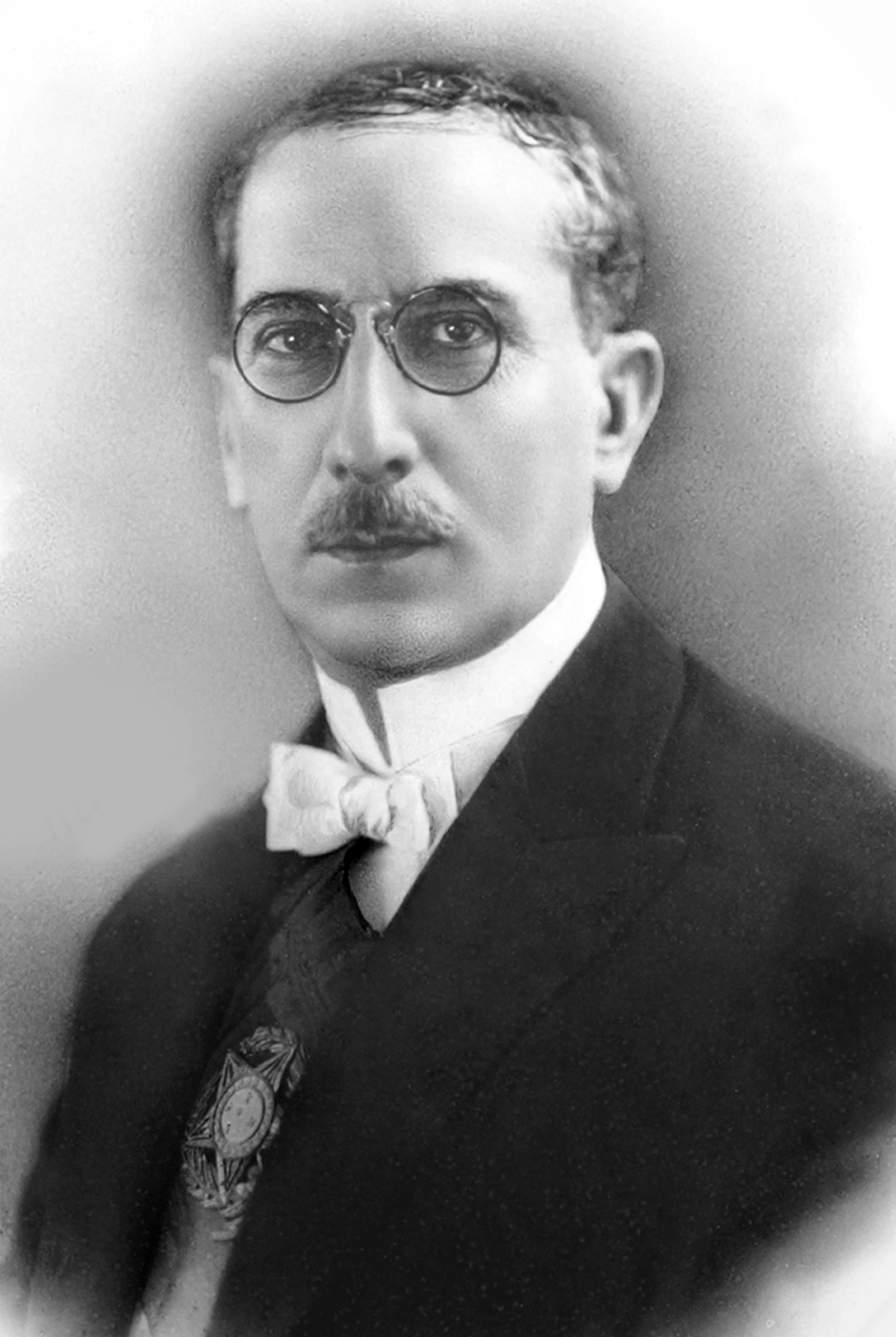
President-elect Artur Bernardes

- Artur Bernardes of the Mineiro Republican Party won the Brazilian presidential election, defeating President Nilo Peçanha. He would be inaugurated as Brazil's 12th president on November 14.
- The Russian Soviet Federative Socialist Republic and Sweden signed a temporary commercial treaty in Stockholm. The Swedish Riksdag would later refuse to ratify it.
- The first trainload of migrating Mennonite Christians in Canada departed from the railway station in Plum Coulee, Manitoba, after Manitoba and Saskatchewan had passed laws requiring regulating schools within their settlements. In all, 6,000 Mennonites would relocate to the Mexican state of Chihuahua to reassemble in the Colonia Manitoba north of Ciudad Cuauhtémoc.
- Born:
  - Yitzhak Rabin, Israeli statesman and general, served as Prime Minister of Israel from 1974 to 1977 and from 1992 to 1995; in Jerusalem, Mandatory Palestine (present-day Israel) (d. 1995, assassinated)
  - William Gaines, American publisher of Mad magazine and EC Comics; in Brooklyn, New York (d. 1992)
  - Michael Flanders, English actor and songwriter, member of comedy duo Flanders and Swann; in London (d. 1975)
- Died: Pichichi, 29, Spanish soccer football forward; died of typhus (b. 1892)

== March 2, 1922 (Thursday) ==
- Margaret Haig Thomas, 2nd Viscountess Rhondda was cleared to become the first female member of the House of Lords in the United Kingdom, after the Committee for Privileges and Conduct agreed with her argument that she was entitled under the law to succeed to the peerage of her father, David Alfred Thomas, 1st Viscount Rhondda, who had died in 1918.
- Charles P. Steinmetz, German-born American electrical engineer and inventor, announced at the General Electric laboratories in Schenectady, New York, that he had "succeeded in producing and controlling an indoor thunderstorm" with the successful test of generators that could discharge over 100,000 volts of electricity at 10,000 amperes for 0.01 seconds.
- All 25 crew of the Norwegian freighter Grøntoft died after the ship foundered in a North Atlantic storm about 500 miles (800 km) southeast of Nova Scotia. By the time the steamship Estonia arrived to the coordinates radioed from the ill-fated ship, there was no trace of the vessel, which had been carrying cargo from Galveston, Texas to Esbjerg in Denmark. According to the captain of the Estonia, as it was racing to the scene, the last message received, at 12:10 p.m., was that the crew had waited too long to lower the lifeboats and to evacuate. "The boats are smashed and some of the men were swept overboard," the telegraph operator signaled, "We are almost awash now. I may be driven out any minute. Hurry. You may not hear from me again."
- Born:
  - Bill Quackenbush, Canadian ice hockey defenceman, inductee to the Hockey Hall of Fame; as Hubert George Quackenbush, in Toronto (d. 1999)
  - David Greenglass, American machinist convicted of espionage for passing the secrets of the atom bomb to the Soviet Union, and the chief witness against his older sister and his brother-in-law, Ethel and Julius Rosenberg, leading to their executions in 1953; in Manhattan, New York City (d. 2014)

== March 3, 1922 (Friday) ==
- Italian Fascists carried out a coup d'état in the Free State of Fiume. Riccardo Zanella, the President of Fiume, yielded after the government palace was shelled by Fascist rebels. Given three minutes to agree to surrender, Zanella yielded to the coup leader, Giovanni Giuriati.
- Variety magazine published its first ranking of most popular films in the United States, initially based on a survey of box office receipts at movie theaters on Broadway in New York City and in other selected cities in the United States, initially as a service "for benefit of out-of-town showmen." The most popular film as of the week ending February 28, was Foolish Wives, directed by Erich von Stroheim.
- Montreal's five-story tall City Hall, which had been built in 1891 at a cost of over one million dollars, was completely destroyed in a fire.
- Thirteen people were killed, and 12 others injured when two trains collided with a bus at a crossing in Painesville, Ohio. The bus was struck on St. Clair Street railroad crossing by an eastbound New York Central Railroad express train. Minutes later, a westbound New York Central Railroad train crashed into the wreckage of the bus and the train.
- Born:
  - Duane D. Pearsall, American entrepreneur, developed the first battery-powered smoke detector for home use; in Pontiac, Michigan (d. 2010)
  - Maurice Biraud, French film actor; in Paris (d. 1982)
- Died: Charles Robinson Rockwood, 61, American civil engineer and irrigation specialist who designed a canal system to bring development in the Colorado Desert in the Imperial Valley of southern California (b. 1860)

== March 4, 1922 (Saturday) ==
- Georgy Chicherin, the Foreign Minister of the Soviet Union, announced a reversal of the position of the Communist government and informed food relief officials that the Soviet government would pay the international obligations that had been incurred by the Russian Empire during the rule of the tsars.
- Babe Ruth signed a new, three-year contract with the New York Yankees, providing a base salary of $50,000 per year and a bonus of $500 for each home run hit in a game. According to the account of the negotiation, Ruth proposed to Yankees co-owner Tillinghast Huston that the terms of his contract would be based on the flip of a coin; if Ruth won the toss, he would get his demands, and if he lost, he would settle for the compromise offered by the Yankees' Jacob Ruppert. "Babe yelled 'tails,'" The New York Times reported, "and the coin so registered when it settled on the carpet in Colonel Huston's room."
- The drama film The Cradle, starring Ethel Clayton and Charles Meredith, was released.
- Born:
  - Richard E. Cunha, cinematographer and film director; in Honolulu, Hawaii (d. 2005)
  - Dina Pathak, Indian actor and director; as Dina Gandhi, in Amreli, Gujarat, British India (present-day India) (d. 2002)
  - Joe Bertony, French-born Australian wartime spy and engineer, played a key role in designing the temporary works that allowed for the construction of the Sydney Opera House sails; in Corsica (d. 2019)
- Died: Bert Williams, 47, Bahamian-born American vaudeville entertainer; died after collapsing on stage at a theater in Detroit a few days earlier (b. 1874)

== March 5, 1922 (Sunday) ==
- Influential German horror film Nosferatu premiered before a group of guests who had been invited to the theater inside the Berlin Zoological Garden. An unauthorized adaptation of Bram Stoker's 1897 novel Dracula, it was released to the public ten days later at the Primus-Palast cinema in Berlin. By the time Stoker's heirs won a copyright infringement suit against director F. W. Murnau and the Prana Film studios, copies of Nosferatu had been distributed world wide and would go on to be celebrated as one of the best films of the century.

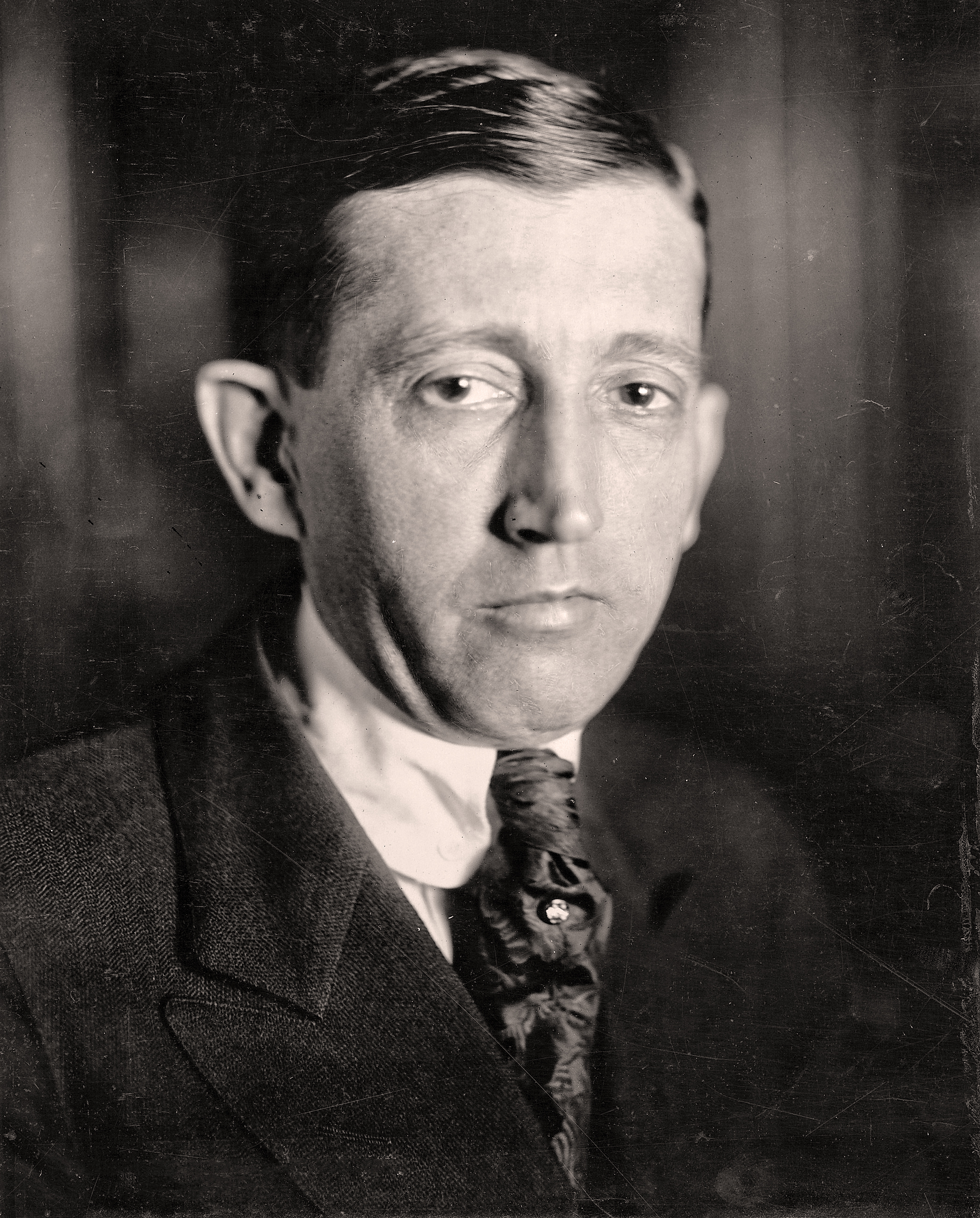
MPDAA director Will H. Hays

- Former U.S. Postmaster General Will H. Hays began working as the American film industry's censor and assumed the job as director of the Motion Picture Producers and Distributors of America (MPDAA). "The potentialities of the moving picture for moral influence and education are limitless," he told reporters, "and therefore its integrity should be protected as we protect the integrity of our churches, and its quality developed as we develop our schools."
- At the age of 61, famous sharpshooter and entertainer Annie Oakley shot a record 98 out of 100 clay targets from a distance of 16 yards.
- WHK in Cleveland, the first commercial radio station to broadcast in the state of Ohio, went on the air.
- The strike of Chinese shipping workers in Hong Kong and Canton, which had started on January 12 because of pay inequities compared to foreign workers, was settled after shipping companies agreed to increase wages by up to 30 percent.
- Born:
  - Martha O'Driscoll, American actress; in Tulsa, Oklahoma (d. 1998)
  - Pier Paolo Pasolini, Italian film director, poet, writer and intellectual; in Bologna, Kingdom of Italy (present-day Italy) (d. 1975)

== March 6, 1922 (Monday) ==
- White miners called for a general strike in South Africa after their employers proposed to open semi-skilled jobs to non-European (i.e. black African or Asian) workers.
- The engagement of the wealthy heiress Edwina Ashley to Lord Louis Mountbatten was announced.
- Born:
  - Wanda Klaff, German war criminal and Nazi camp commandant; as Wanda Kalacinski, in Danzig, Free City of Danzig (present-day Gdańsk, Poland) (d. 1946, executed)
  - Doriot Anthony Dwyer, American flutist and one of the first women to be awarded a principal chair in a major U.S. orchestra; as Doriot Anthony, in Streator, Illinois (d. 2020)
  - Robert Koehl, American historian and specialist on the Nazi movement in Germany; in Chicago (d. 2015)

== March 7, 1922 (Tuesday) ==
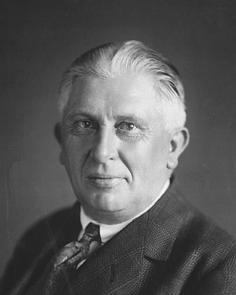
Icelandic Prime Minister Sigurður Eggerz

- Sigurður Eggerz became Prime Minister of Iceland for a second time.
- The Graystone Ballroom opened in Detroit.
- The mystery film Sherlock Holmes starring John Barrymore was released.
- Born:
  - Nathan Shapell, Polish-born American real estate developer, philanthropist and Holocaust survivor, founder of Shapell Industries, Inc., one of the largest homebuilders in California; as Nathan Shapelski, in Poland (d. 2007)
  - Mochtar Lubis, Indonesian novelist and journalist, later a dissident; in Padang, West Sumatra, Dutch East Indies (present-day Indonesia) (d. 2004)
- Died: William Laurentz, 27, French tennis player who won the International Lawn Tennis Federation (ILTF) World Hard Court Championships singles title in 1920; died from blood sepsis due to influenza (b. 1895)

== March 8, 1922 (Wednesday) ==
- The Jugendbund der NSDAP, the youth auxiliary wing for the National Socialist German Workers' Party, was formed, with an announcement in the Nazi Party newspaper, the Völkischer Beobachter. There were three sections, one for boys aged 14 to 16, another for boys 16 to 18, and a girls' organization. It would later become known as Hitler Youth, which was mandatory for German adolescents during World War II.
- The United States formally declined to participate in the Genoa Conference.
- The 14th Canadian Parliament, the first under new Prime Minister William Lyon Mackenzie King, opened in Ottawa.
- The Newswomen's Club of New York was founded, by a group of female reporters, initially as the New York Newspaper Woman's Club.
- Winds of 108 miles per hour (174 km/h) winds were recorded in the Isles of Scilly as a hurricane swept the coast of England.
- Born:
  - Ralph H. Baer, German-born American electronics engineer, invented the first home video game console, the Magnavox Odyssey; as Rudolf Heinrich Baer, in Rodalben, Weimar Republic (present-day Germany) (d. 2014)
  - Cyd Charisse, American film actress and dancer, leading lady and co-star of Singin' in the Rain; as Tula Ellice Finklea, in Amarillo, Texas (d. 2008)
  - Yevgeny Matveyev, Soviet actor and film director; in Novoukrainka, Ukrainian SSR (present-day Ukraine) (d. 2003)
  - John Burke, British playwright, screenwriter and novelist[ in Rye, Sussex (d. 2011)
  - Shigeru Mizuki, Japanese historian and manga artist; as Shigeru Mura, in Sakaiminato, Tottori, Empire of Japan (present-day Japan) (d. 2015)
  - Carl Furillo, American Major League Baseball player, 1953 National League batting champion; in Stony Creek Mills, Pennsylvania (d. 1989)
- Died: Elizabeth Cotton, Lady Hope, 79, British evangelist, claimed in 1915 that Charles Darwin had told her on his deathbed that he regretted publishing On the Origin of Species (b. 1842)

== March 9, 1922 (Thursday) ==
- The Eugene O'Neill play The Hairy Ape opened at the Provincetown Playhouse in New York.
- Giovanni Giuriati, a Fascist Party member of the Italian Chamber of Deputies, resigned from the Chamber and made plans to become the new leader of the Free State of Fiume, with an objective of having the semi-independent state annexed back into Italy.
- Born:
  - George W. Casey Sr., U.S. Army Major General, highest ranking American officer to be killed in the Vietnam War; in Boston (d. 1970)
  - Felice Schragenheim, German Jewish resistance fighter and Holocaust victim, known for her tragic love story with Lilly Wust; in Berlin, Weimar Republic (present-day Germany) (d. 1944)
  - Count Flemming of Rosenborg, Danish prince and Navy commander; in Stockholm, Sweden (d. 2002)
- Died:
  - Kumaraswamy Pulavar, 68, Sri Lankan scholar who worked toward reviving Tamil-language works and traditions (b. 1854)
  - William H. Remick, 55, American banker and former President of the New York Stock Exchange; died of a heart attack (b. 1866)

== March 10, 1922 (Friday) ==
- The Mahatma Gandhi was arrested in India for sedition.
- Martial law was declared in Johannesburg in response to incidents of sabotage, fighting and looting during the miners' strike. The action came after nine special constables, hired to protect the mines, were shot and killed, while another 27 policemen were taken hostage at Newlands near Johannesburg.
- Germany's Interior Minister Adolf Köster ordered all monarchist emblems removed from public buildings, as well as images of the former Kaiser Wilhelm II. Köster said that exceptions would be made for emblems that were "structurally incorporated in buildings where their removal would destroy the architectural value and effect" or images where removal would destroy the "artistic and historical unity" of the decorations.
- Colorado's first licensed radio station, KLZ, was established in Denver.
- Died: Harry Kellar, 72, American stage magician; died of pulmonary hemorrhage (b. 1849)

== March 11, 1922 (Saturday) ==
- Riots killed 100 striking gold mine workers in the worst day of the Rand Rebellion in the Witwatersrand region of South Africa. The heaviest casualties were in the city of Benoni, Gauteng, where a South African Army pilot dropped bombs on the Benoni Trades Hall where a meeting of strikers was taking place. In Johannesburg, 19 police and 13 civilians were killed in fighting.
- The National Intercollegiate Basketball Tournament, the first national college basketball championship ever held in the United States, was played in Indianapolis, Indiana, with six colleges participating in the tournament. The title was won by Wabash College, which had the best record in the Indiana Intercollegiate Athletic Association, and defeated Michigan Intercollegiate Athletic Association champion Kalamazoo College, 43 to 23. Other teams that participated were Mercer College of Georgia, Grove City College, Illinois Wesleyan College, and the University of Idaho.
- Born:
  - Abdul Razak Hussein, Malaysian lawyer and politician, served as second Prime Minister of Malaysia from 1970 to 1975; in Pekan, Penang, British Malaya (present-day Malaysia) (d. 1976)
  - José Luis López Vázquez, Spanish stage and film actor; in Madrid, Spain (d. 2009)
  - Vincent Mroz, U.S. Secret Service agent and Marine Corps veteran who helped foil the 1950 attempted assassination of Harry S. Truman; in Stanley, Wisconsin (d. 2008)
- Died:
  - Gordon McGregor, 49, Canadian businessman, founded the Ford Motor Company of Canada in 1904 and created the first Canadian mass-produced automobile, the Ford Model C; died of a blood-vessel disorder (b. 1873)
  - Joe Gerhardt, 67, American professional baseball player; died of a heart attack (b. 1855)

== March 12, 1922 (Sunday) ==
- The Transcaucasian Socialist Federative Soviet Republic was established as a nominally-independent Communist nation by the merger of three soviet socialist republics (Armenia, Azerbaijan and Georgia) with a capital at Tiflis (now the Georgian capital of Tbilisi). It was ruled by a three-member joint council composed of the chief executives of each SSR, Alexander Miasnikian of Armenia, Nariman Narimanov of Azerbaijan and Polikarp Mdivani of Georgia, all with the approval of the Russian SFSR's Joseph Stalin, who wanted the three republics to join a union as one republic. On December 30, 1922, the Transcausian SFSR would join the Russian SFSR, Ukrainian SSR, and Byelorussian SSR to form the Union of Soviet Socialist Republics.
- In India, the Mahatma Gandhi offered to plead guilty to the charges against him and declined to present any legal defense. He would receive the minimum sentence for sedition, six years.
- A bullet was fired into the automobile of South African Prime Minister Jan Smuts, but he was not injured.
- Born:
  - Jack Kerouac, American novelist, known for his 1957 Beat Generation classic On the Road; as Jean-Louis Kérouac, in Lowell, Massachusetts (d. 1969)
  - Lane Kirkland, American labor union leader, served as President of the AFL-CIO from 1979 to 1995; as Joseph Lane Kirkland, in Camden, South Carolina (d. 1999)
- Died:
  - H. Irving Hancock, 54, prolific American author, known for his series of books for boys in the late 19th and early 20th centuries, including the popular four-book series The Invasion of the United States; died of liver failure (b. 1868)
  - Hugh Mangum, 44, American photographer; died of pneumonia (b. 1877)

== March 13, 1922 (Monday) ==
- The Prince of Wales Royal Military College was inaugurated in Dehradun in the Doon Valley in India by Edward, Prince of Wales. The academy, now called Rashtriya Indian Military College, is located in India's Uttarakhand state.

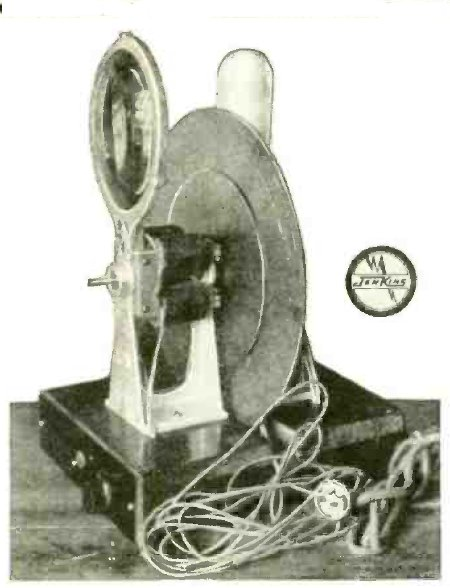
The Jenkins televisor receiver, with magnifying glass

- American inventor Charles F. Jenkins became one of the first persons to file a patent application for a television transmitter and receiver. U.S. Patent No. 1,544,156 was granted on June 30, 1925 for "Transmitting pictures by wireless", a mechanical television system that initially allowed scanning and transmission of silhouette images. In 1928, he would open the first television station, W3XK. Jenkins's system, which relied on a rotating disc to scan and receive the scene, was superseded by the electronic television system.
- Government forces gained the upper hand in South Africa against the rebels. A total of 2,200 had been captured up to that time.
- Delegates from Estonia, Finland, Latvia, Lithuania and Poland opened a five-day conference in Warsaw to create a defensive league and arbitrate disputes.
- The third trial of Fatty Arbuckle began.
- WRR in Dallas, Texas, received its federal license, becoming the first federally licensed radio station in the state of Texas, and broadcast on 1310 AM. Owned by the city of Dallas, it is the oldest radio station that has not changed ownership in the United States. It was started by the city of Dallas on August 5, 1921 out of the fire station.
- Died: Henry Otto Wix, 55, German-born American painter; committed suicide (b. 1866)

== March 14, 1922 (Tuesday) ==
- South African rebels surrendered in Fordsburg to government troops after 75 minutes of bombardment.
- Kenyan anti-colonialist Harry Thuku was arrested by British colonial authorities for his activities in his East African Association. He was exiled to British Somaliland and would remain there for six years before being allowed to return.
- Born: Colin Fletcher, Welsh-born American hiker and writer who popularized wilderness backpacking with his 1968 book The Complete Walker; in Cardiff, Wales (d. 2007)
- Died:
  - Clemens von Podewils-Dürniz, 72, Bavarian politician, served as Minister-President of Bavaria from 1903 to 1912 (b. 1850)
  - Lewis P. Featherstone, 70, American farm activist who served one year as a Labor Party U.S. Representative from Arkansas from 1890 to 1891 (b. 1851)

== March 15, 1922 (Wednesday) ==
- Éamon de Valera announced the formation of a new party, the Cumann na Poblachta. The goal of the new movement was to work toward making Ireland a republic independent of the United Kingdom and to repudiate the Anglo-Irish Treaty that had created the Irish Free State.
- WSB in Atlanta, the first licensed radio station in the U.S. state of Georgia, went on the air.
- KGG in Portland, the first licensed radio station in Oregon, went on the air.
- In the Irish city of Galway, a group of four armed men invaded the St. Bride's Home hospital and shot and killed three constables of the Royal Irish Constabulary while they were in bed recovering from wounds.
- Born: Richard M. Ketchum, American historian, editor of American Heritage magazine and specialist in history of the American Revolutionary War; in Pittsburgh (d. 2012)

== March 16, 1922 (Thursday) ==
- Ahmed Fuad Pasha was proclaimed as King Fuad I of Egypt in a ceremony "accompanied by the firing of salvos of 100 guns in Cairo, Alexandria and Port Said, and of 21 guns in all the other provincial capitals."
- At least 21 protesters were killed by police in Nairobi, the capital of the British East African colony of Kenya, after a crowd of more than 7,000 people surrounded a police station where dissident Harry Thuku was being held in detention.
- Louis "Lepke" Buchalter was released from Sing Sing, the New York state penitentiary in Ossining, New York after completing 26 months of a 30-month sentence for burglary, and teamed up with mobster Jacob Shapiro to begin a takeover of labor unions in New York City's Garment District. Within a decade, he would create a system for carrying out contracts for murder on behalf of various New York gangs by hiring non-mobsters to do the killing.
- The South African rebellion ended.
- The French Red Cross and the Soviet government signed an agreement in Berlin on measures to fight the Russian famine. It was the first contract ever concluded between France and Soviet Russia.
- WHD in Morgantown, West Virginia became the first licensed radio station in West Virginia.
- Born:
  - Jacqueline Baudrier, French journalist and radio and TV network administrator, served as president and CEO of Radio France from 1975 to 1981; as Jacqueline Vibert, in Beaufai, Orne departement (d. 2009)
  - Zdeněk Liška, Czech film score composer; in Smečno, Czechoslovakia (present-day Czech Republic) (d. 1983)
  - Karem Mahmoud, popular Egyptian singer and actor; in Damanhur (d. 1995)
  - Harding Lemay, American TV screenwriter and playwright; in Bangor, New York (d. 2018)
- Died: G. B. Halsted, 68, American mathematician and expert on non-Euclidean geometry (b. 1853)

== March 17, 1922 (Friday) ==
- Italy sent troops to occupy the Free State of Fiume in response to the coup, saying it was only doing so because the Treaty of Rapallo assigned Italy the responsibility of policing the state and because it sought to ensure the election of a legal government.
- A team of 15 U.S. Customs Service special agents made one of the first great busts of the Prohibition era as it seized the cargo of the two-masted schooner Clara as "well-dressed men wearing diamonds" were unloading 4,000 cases of Scotch whiskey at the shore of the East River in the Bronx. Watching from a well offshore, the crew of a Customs Service launch spotted intermittent flashes of light that appeared to be signals, then pulled up alongside and fought a gun battle in which nobody was wounded. In addition to arresting 20 rumrunners, the customs agents confiscated the cargo (48,000 bottles of scotch, with 12 bottles per case), valued at $500,000.
- The Warsaw Accord was signed by representatives of Finland, Poland, Estonia, and Latvia as a treaty of respect for each other's sovereignty and reciprocity, as well as a pledge to guarantee the rights of ethnic minorities (Finns, Poles, Estonians and Latvians) in each of the signatory countries. However, Finland's Foreign Minister Rudolf Holsti was unable to persuade the Finnish Parliament to ratify the pact.
- WIP, Philadelphia's first commercial radio station, went on the air.
- Born:
  - Günter Luther, German admiral, served in the Kriegsmarine and the Luftwaffe during World War II, became the Inspector of the Navy of the West German Navy, and served as the Deputy Supreme Allied Commander Europe of NATO from 1980 to 1982; in Bestwig, Prussia, Germany (d. 1997)
  - Radhia Haddad, Tunisian feminist and advocate for women's rights; as Radhia Ben Ammar, in Tunis (d. 2003)
  - Patrick Suppes, American scientist and philosopher; in Tulsa, Oklahoma (d. 2014)

== March 18, 1922 (Saturday) ==
- The first bat mitzvah ceremony in the U.S. for a Jewish girl, the counterpart to the bar mitzvah coming of age ceremony for a Jewish boy, was conducted for Judith Kaplan, the 12-year-old daughter of Rabbi Mordecai Kaplan, at their synagogue in the Society for the Advancement of Judaism building in New York City.
- In Ahmedabad, India, freedom fighter Mohandas K. Gandhi was sentenced to six years in jail after being convicted of sedition. He would serve for 23 months, until his early and unconditional release on February 4, 1924, on the advice of physicians who recommended that he be allowed six months convalescence to recover from illness.
- The Communist Party of Great Britain assembled in London for its fourth party congress.
- Born:
  - Egon Bahr, West German politician, served as chief adviser to Chancellor Willy Brandt from 1969 to 1974, formulated the Ostpolitik strategy; in Treffurt, Weimar Republic (d. 2015)
  - Aaron Shikler, American portrait artist known for his portraits of American statesmen, including John F. Kennedy, Jackie Kennedy, and Lady Bird Johnson; in Brooklyn (d. 2015)
  - Emilio Gatti, Italian nuclear electronics engineer and inventor of the silicon drift detector for the measurement of x-ray radiation; in Turin(d. 2016)

== March 19, 1922 (Sunday) ==
- Franz Hailer became the first pilot to land a plane on Zugspitze, Germany's highest mountain, when he landed a Rumpler C.I on the Schneeferner glacier, 500 metres from the summit.
- Born:
  - Hiroo Onoda, Japanese Imperial Army soldier who refused to acknowledge the Japanese surrender in World War II, and remained in hiding in the Philippines until finally surrendering in 1974; in Kainan, Wakayama (d. 2014)
  - FrancEyE, American poet; as Frances Dean Smith, in San Rafael, California (d. 2009)
- Died:
  - Valente Quintero, 34-35, Mexican Army officer whose duel with Martín Elenes was popularized by a corrido written by Rosendo Monzón and in the 1973 film, Valente Quintero, was shot and killed in the duel. (b. 1887)
  - Max von Hausen, 75, German Army commander, served as the Minister of War for the Kingdom of Saxony from 1902 to 1914 and commanded the German Third Army in World War I (b. 1846)

== March 20, 1922 (Monday) ==
- The USS Langley, converted from the collier USS Jupiter, entered service as the first American aircraft carrier.
- U.S. President Warren G. Harding ordered the withdrawal of the remaining 4,000 U.S. Army troops occupying Germany, with plans to remove all of them by July 1.
- President Harding signed the General Land Exchange Act of 1922 into law, providing for the United States Forest Service to expand the contiguous area of existing national forests by allowing the federal agency to exchange holdings of equal value to acquire privately owned lands within the boundaries of a forest.
- The Communist Party of Italy opened its second party congress in Rome.
- The American newspaper comic panel Out Our Way, written and drawn by J. R. Williams, began a run of 55 years, with its first NEA-syndicated strip appearing in several dailies, including the Miami News and the Brooklyn Citizen. One paper introduced it as "a daily bit of entertaining, homely humor about the kind of people we all 'know'. Don't miss it." Within 20 years, the panel was in 725 daily papers and its Sunday strip feature was in 262 papers.
- Born: Carl Reiner, American comedian, film and TV actor, director and producer, best known for creating and acting in The Dick Van Dyke Show; in the Bronx, New York City (d. 2020)

== March 21, 1922 (Tuesday) ==
- United Mine Workers of America (UMWA) President John L. Lewis announced a strike of all UMWA coal miners in the United States and Canada, effective at midnight March 31, when the existing contract between the UMWA and coal companies was set to expire. "This will be the greatest strike in the history of the coal industry," Lewis declared, in that would see 600,000 anthracite and bituminous coal miners walking off of their jobs.
- The border dispute between Finland and the Soviet Union was ended by agreement, allowing Karelian refugees from Russia's Kareliya Soviet Socialist Republic to cross into Finland's Karjala provinces until June (with 30,000 taking advantage of the opportunity).
- Queen Mary inaugurated London Waterloo station.
- Born:
  - David H. Malan, British psychiatrist and pioneer in psychotherapy; in Ootacamund, Madras Province, British India (present-day Ooty, Tamil Nadu state, India) (d. 2020)
  - Alan D.B. Clarke, British psychologist and pioneer in responding to children's learning disabilities; in Surrey (d. 2011)
  - Paul H. Mussen, American psychologist and specialist in children's psychological development; in Paterson, New Jersey (d. 2000)
  - Russ Meyer, U.S. film producer and director known for pioneering the first commercially successful softcore "sexploitation films"; in San Leandro, California (d. 2004)
- Died: C. V. Raman Pillai, 63, Indian Malayalam language novelist and playwright known for Marthandavarma (b. 1858)

== March 22, 1922 (Wednesday) ==
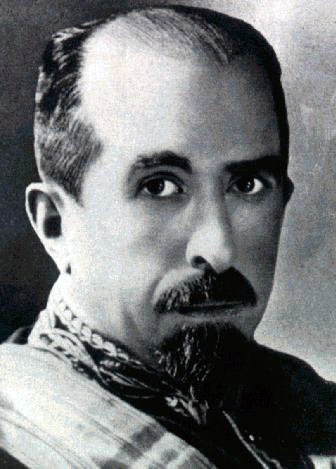
Italian politician Giovanni Giuriati

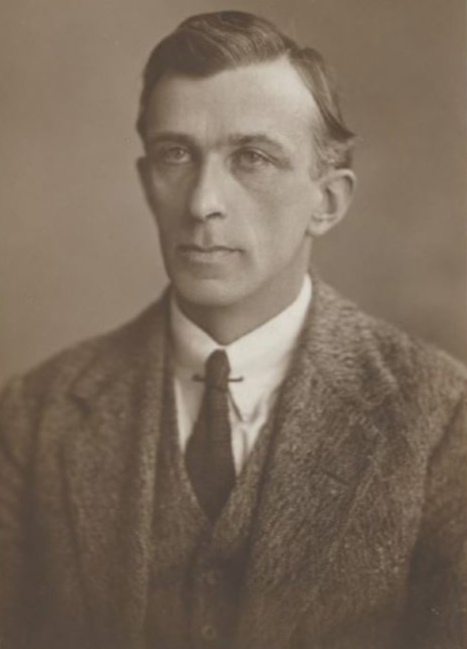
Irish republican Rory O'Connor

- Giovanni Giuriati, a Fascist Party member of the Italian Chamber of Deputies, was installed as the new President of the Free State of Fiume after the coup d'état had removed the previous government.
- Irish republican Rory O'Connor gave an infamous press conference declaring that the IRA would no longer obey the Dáil because, he said, it had abandoned the Republic. When asked if that meant that they were to set up a military dictatorship, he said, "You can take it that way if you like."
- After a session that had started the night before in Paris, the Allied Commission on Reparations called on Germany to put limitations on the amount of paper money that it was printing, and declared that 470 million gold marks were still owed to the Allies as well as 1.45 billion gold marks worth of material resources. Later in the day, the Commission gave Germany's government until May 31 to comply, on the threat of additional action under the Treaty of Versailles.
- J. B. A. Robertson, the Governor of Oklahoma, was arrested at his home after being indicted earlier in the day on charges of accepting a bribe from the Guaranty State Bank of Okmulgee in order to permit the insolvent bank to keep operating. Governor Robertson posted a $5,000 bail bond and was released until a trial could be held. Although he would be acquitted of charges and serve until the expiration of his four-year term in January, he would not hold office again.
- All five passengers on a U.S. airliner were killed when the seaplane crashed into the sea during its flight from Miami to the Bahamas, with a destination of Bimini. The crash of the "Miss Miami" was the deadliest civilian airplane accident in the U.S. up to that time. The group survived the crash, but over the next 56 hours, drifted at sea, dying one-by-one.
- Born:
  - Annamma Mathew, Indian publisher and founder of Vanitha, the largest selling women's magazine in India; in West Godavari district, Madras Province, British India (d. 2003)
  - David Lansana, Sierra Leonean military officer who staged Sierra Leon's first coups d'état in 1967; in Baiima (d. 1975, executed)
  - Uthradom Thirunal Marthanda Varma, Indian nobleman and businessman who acquired the hereditary title of Maharaja of Travancore after India had abolished hereditary royal titles; in Trivandrum, Kingdom of Travancore, British India (present-day Thiruvananthapuram, Kerala (d. 2013)
- Died: Kazi Dawa Samdup, 53, Sikkimese-born linguist who was the first to translate texts from Tibetan Buddhism into English, introducing Buddhism to the English-speaking world (b. 1868)

== March 23, 1922 (Thursday) ==
- The British Royal Navy submarine H42 was lost along with all 24 of its crew after making the mistake of surfacing into the path of the destroyer HMS Versatile. Both vessels were participating in training maneuvers off of the coast of Gibraltar when the H42 came to the surface at a point no further than 120 feet (37 m) from the Versatile, which was traveling at 20 knots, equivalent to 23 miles per hour (37 km/h) or almost 34 feet per second. A few seconds later, the bow of Versatile rammed the conning tower of H42.
- Lawrence Sperry became the first pilot to land a plane at the U.S. Capitol. His small scout plane touched down on the concrete plaza in front of the Capitol building and rolled up the steps in order to stop because the plane had no brakes.
- U.S. Congressman Martin C. Ansorge, a Republican from New York, nominated an African American student to United States Naval Academy, which had not happened since 1871. Although there had been three Black midshipmen at the Naval Academy in the 1870s, Emile Treville Holley was not accepted for enrollment because of racist attitudes at the time. As The New York Times reported, U.S. Navy officers and Annapolis midshipmen who "will not talk for publication on this matter" expressed the idea that "the fate that awaits the candidate is social ostracism" and that "it is safe to say that the midshipmen have condemned him to Coventry, just as nearly fifty years ago the midshipmen of 1873, 1874 and 1875 refused to receive as equals three other negro boys..." Holley enrolled instead at Middlebury College in Vermont and became its first Black graduate, then went on to become a college professor.
- In Argentina, a party of explorers sponsored by the Buenos Aires Zoo departed for Patagonia on an expedition to a lake in the Chubut Province, where a large creature had been reportedly seen. According to the director of the zoo, the lake was 50 miles (80 km) from the 16 de Octubre valley. Reports had described it variously as a plesiosaurus, a glyptodon or a megatherium, and the group was given six weeks to arrange for "the capture or destruction of the anachronistic creature."
- WEY in Wichita became the first licensed radio station in Kansas.
- WKC in Baltimore became the first licensed radio station in the state of Maryland.
- WKN in Memphis, Tennessee became the first commercial radio station in that state.
- Born:
  - Abderrahim Bouabid, Moroccan politician, served as Minister of Finance from 1958 to 1960; in Salé(d. 1992)
  - Robert Simons, English cricketer and wicket-keeper; in Watford, Hertfordshire (d. 2011)
  - Ugo Tognazzi, Italian comedian and film actor; as Ottavio Tognazzi, in Cremona (d. 1990)

== March 24, 1922 (Friday) ==
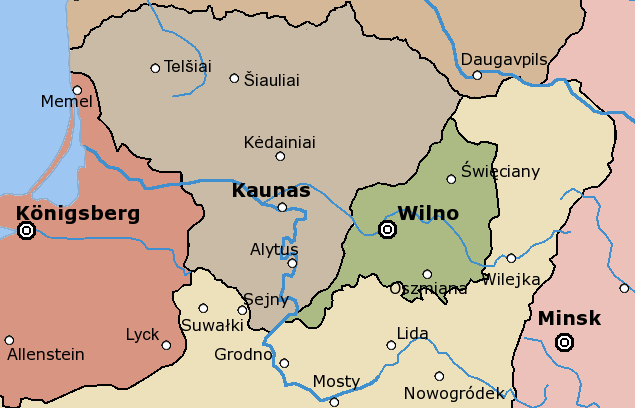
Central Lithuania (in green)

- Poland annexed the Republic of Central Lithuania, a puppet state that had been created by Poland in 1920 following an invasion of the Republic of Lithuania.
- The Salomón–Lozano Treaty was signed to settle a border dispute between the South American nations of Peru and Colombia in the Amazon River valley, with Peru ceding a large amount of its northeastern territory to Colombia and Colombia ceding a small amount of its southeastern area to Peru. Dissatisfaction in Peru about the Treaty would lead, more than 10 years later, to an eight month long war between the two nations from September 1, 1932 to May 24, 1933.
- Edsel Ford, the president of the Ford Motor Company, announced that the automobile manufacturer would become the first major corporation to permanently adopt a 40-hour week. Ford Motor reduced its work week to five days, with the no operations on the weekend. The entry wage of six dollars per day continued unchanged, however, meaning that he weekly wage would be less because of no work on Saturday. Edsel Ford said in a statement, "Every man needs more than one day a week for rest and recreation. The Ford Company always has sought to promote ideal home life for its employees. We believe that in order to live properly every man should have more time to spend with his family."
- The U.S. Senate ratified the "Four-Power Treaty" by a vote of 67 to 27, with only 12 of the Senate's 35 Democrats in favor. The Treaty had been signed by Japan, the United States, the United Kingdom, and France at the Washington Naval Conference at the end of 1921 and the four nations pledged not to further expand their territories in the Pacific Ocean.
- An explosion at the Colorado Fuel and Iron Company's Sopris Mine No. 2 killed the 18 employees inside. The blast, near Trinidad, Colorado, occurred minutes after the 200 coal miners on the day shift had gone home.
- The McMahon killings of six Roman Catholic civilians, was carried out in Northern Ireland by a group of men dressed in police uniforms, in a home invasion in Belfast.
- Music Hall won the Grand National horse race in England.
- The Swiss Federal Council settled a long-running border dispute between Venezuela and Colombia by siding with Colombia.
- The Regierungskommission of Germany created a 30-member Regional Council to govern the disputed territory of Saarland.
- Born:
  - Farrokhroo Parsa, Iranian physician, educator and parliamentarian, first female member of the Cabinet of Iran and served as the Minister of Education from 1968 to 1971; in Qom (d. 1980, executed)
  - Saitō Satoshi, Japanese martial artist of the Negishi-ryū Shurikenjutsu tradition; in Tokyo (d. 2014)

== March 25, 1922 (Saturday) ==
- The United Kingdom and Iraq signed a military agreement giving the British control over Iraqi defenses.
- The Brazilian Communist Party was founded.
- Born: Stephen Toulmin, British philosopher and expert on the effective use of rhetoric; in London (d. 2009)

== March 26, 1922 (Sunday) ==
- The Allied Powers agreed to amend the Treaty of Sèvres in an attempt to end the Greco-Turkish War, but the Turkish Nationalists refused to sign an armistice until Greece evacuated all its forces from Anatolia.
- Born: Syed Ali Ahsan, Bangladeshi poet and scholar; in Alokdia, Bengal Province, British India (present-day Bangladesh) (d. 2002])

== March 27, 1922 (Monday) ==
- As the Russian Civil War continued, troops under the command of General Mikhail Korobeinikov of the anti-Bolshevik Yakut People's Army took control of the Siberian city of Yakutsk.
- Richard Enright, the New York City Police Commissioner, sent a general order to every station advising that a new ordinance had gone into effect, prohibiting women from smoking in public places, and directing police to assess a minimum fine of five dollars per offense against any restaurant or resort where women were seen smoking. Murray Hulbert, the chairman of the Board of Aldermen, said that he was unaware of the ordinance, which had been passed on March 14, but Alderman Peter J. McGuinness, who had sponsored the measure, said that he had watched its approval and signing by Mayor John F. Hylan. A subsequent investigation found that a city clerk, Daniel W. F. McCoy, had mistaken a draft of the ordinance for a law that had been passed and had forwarded it to Commissioner Enright.
- The U.S. Supreme Court decided United Zinc & Chemical Co. v. Britt, modifying the attractive nuisance doctrine in common law, which held a landowner responsible for the injuries of trespassing children if the cause of injury had been a dangerous object that could reasonably have been expected to be of interest to a child coming on to the property. In a 6 to 3 ruling, the Court held that a defendant was not liable if the child had come on to the property without having been attracted to the cause of injury (in the instance at hand, two boys, aged 8 and 11, had died in 1916 after their discovery of a large pool of contaminated water that had not been visible from the area around the property).
- Born:
  - Stefan Wul, French science fiction writer; as Pierre Pairault, in Paris(d. 2003)
  - Margaret Stacey, British sociologist and pioneer in developing medical sociology; as Margaret Petrie, in London (d. 2004)
  - Josephine Kabick, American baseball pitcher in the All-American Girls Professional Baseball League; in Detroit (d. 1978)
- Died: Lucian W. Parrish, 44, American politician, served as U.S. Representative for the 13th District of Texas from 1919 until his death, died of cerebral meningitis contracted in a hospital 12 days after being seriously injured in an automobile accident while campaigning for the nomination of U.S. Senator of Texas (b. 1878)

== March 28, 1922 (Tuesday) ==
- In Shanghai, two Koreans attempted to assassinate the former Japanese Minister of War Tanaka Giichi as he was getting off a ship. They shot at Tanaka but missed, killing an American woman instead. Both would-be assassins were quickly apprehended.
- A gunman attempted to assassinate former Russian Foreign Minister Pavel Milyukov, who had been delivering a speech in Berlin to a gathering of Russians who had left after the October Revolution. The bullet instead struck former Russian Secretary of State Vladimir D. Nabokov, the father of author Vladimir Nabokov, who died at the scene. The assassin, Russian expatriate Sergey Taboritsky, would be sentenced to 14 years hard labor by a German court but released in 1927 under a general amnesty.
- The Toronto St. Pats beat the Vancouver Millionaires, 5 to 1, to win ice hockey's Stanley Cup, three games to two.
- A solar eclipse took place and was visible over most of north Africa.
- Born:
  - Margaret Owens, American professional rodeo cowgirl, first Women's Professional Rodeo Association champion in barrel racing; in San Angelo, Texas (d. 1955)
  - Joey Maxim, American professional boxer and world light heavyweight champion from 1950 to 1952; as Giuseppe Berardinelli, in Cleveland (d. 2001)
  - Felice Chiusano, Italian singer and member of the popular Quartetto Cetra vocal quarter; in Fondi (d. 1990)
  - James Richardson, Canadian cabinet minister, served as the Minister of National Defence from 1972 to 1976; in Winnipeg (d. 2004)

== March 29, 1922 (Wednesday) ==
- In New York, American boxing promoter Tex Rickard was acquitted by a jury of all charges of assault and abduction of a 15-year-old girl. The District Attorney's office subsequently quashed three other indictments.
- The printing press of the Irish newspaper The Freeman's Journal was destroyed by IRA men for its support of the Anglo-Irish Treaty.
- The U.S. Senate unanimously (75 to 0) voted to ratify a treaty banning the use of poison gas in warfare, as well as the use of submarines in warfare. On another measure, U.S. Senator Joseph I. France of Maryland was the only person to vote no in a 74 to 1 decision to approve the Washington Naval Treaty limiting further warship construction.

== March 30, 1922 (Thursday) ==
- Representatives of the Irish Free State, Northern Ireland, the United Kingdom and the Irish Republican Army signed an agreement in London for a halt to hostilities, after an all-day conference at the Office of the Secretary of State for the Colonies in London.
- The U.S. Senate unanimously approved the Nine-Power Treaty, 66 to 0, respecting the sovereignty and the territorial integrity of China. Another measure regarding Chinese tariffs passed 58 to 1, with Senator William H. King of Utah being the only one to vote no.
- Portuguese aviator Sacadura Cabral and navigator Gago Coutinho began a trouble-plagued attempt to make the first crossing of the South Atlantic Ocean by airplane, departing from Lisbon in Portugal, en route to Rio de Janeiro in Brazil. British aviators John Alcock and Arthur Brown had previously made a nonstop crossing of the North Atlantic by airplane on June 14 to 15, 1919. Flying the Portuguese Navy airplane Lusitânia, Cabral and Coutinho landed at Las Palmas in the Canary Islands on the same day they left and noticed a fuel problem that took six days to repair. On their second flight on April 5, they landed on São Vicente Island off of West Africa, and took 12 days for more repairs. Their April 17 flight landed in the waters of Brazil's Saint Peter and Saint Paul Archipelago, where the Lusitânia, like the ill-fated RMS Lusitania of 1915, sank in the sea. Ultimately, the Portuguese duo would arrive in Rio in a different airplane on June 17.
- Born:
  - Arthur Wightman, American mathematical physicist who devised the Wightman axioms for quantum field theory; in Rochester, New York (d. 2013)
  - Turhan Bey, Austrian film and TV actor, known as "The Turkish Delight"; as Turhan Gilbert Selahattin Şahultavi, in Vienna (d. 2012)
- Died: John Craig Eaton, 45, Canadian businessman and philanthropist, president of Eaton's and oversaw the company's growth as it became the largest department store chain in Canada, died of pneumonia (b. 1876)

== March 31, 1922 (Friday) ==
- The Anglo-Irish Treaty was given "the force of law" after the Irish Free State (Agreement) Act 1922 received royal assent immediately after Parliament had passed it. The terms provided that the Parliament of Southern Ireland would be dissolved within four months and that the provisional government of the Irish Free State would set the terms for new election. Articles 11 and 12 of the Treaty provided that the six counties in Northern Ireland would have "one month from the passing of the Act of Parliament" to decide whether to become part of the Irish Free State and that unless "both Houses of the Parliament of Northern Ireland" passed such a request, "the powers of the Parliament and Government of the Irish Free State shall no longer extend to Northern Ireland".
- In the deadliest airplane crash of 1922, all 14 people aboard a Beijing-Han Airlines flight were killed when the Handley Page Type O/7 struck the tops of trees while making its approach to Nanyuan Airport in Peiping.
- The first licensed radio station in the state of Louisiana, WWL in New Orleans, began broadcasting.
- The Hinterkaifeck murders, one of the most gruesome unsolved crimes in Germany, were carried out at a farmstead near Waidhofen, in Bavaria. Five members of the family of Andreas Gruber (including his two young grandchildren) were beaten to death along with their maid, Maria Baumgartner, who had just started working for the family. The bodies of the victims were discovered four days later. Although several suspects were arrested and interrogated, no person was ever charged with the crime.
- Born: Richard Kiley, American stage and television actor, winner of two Tony Awards and three Emmy Awards; in Chicago (d. 1999)
