= Zamoskvoretsky Sports Club =

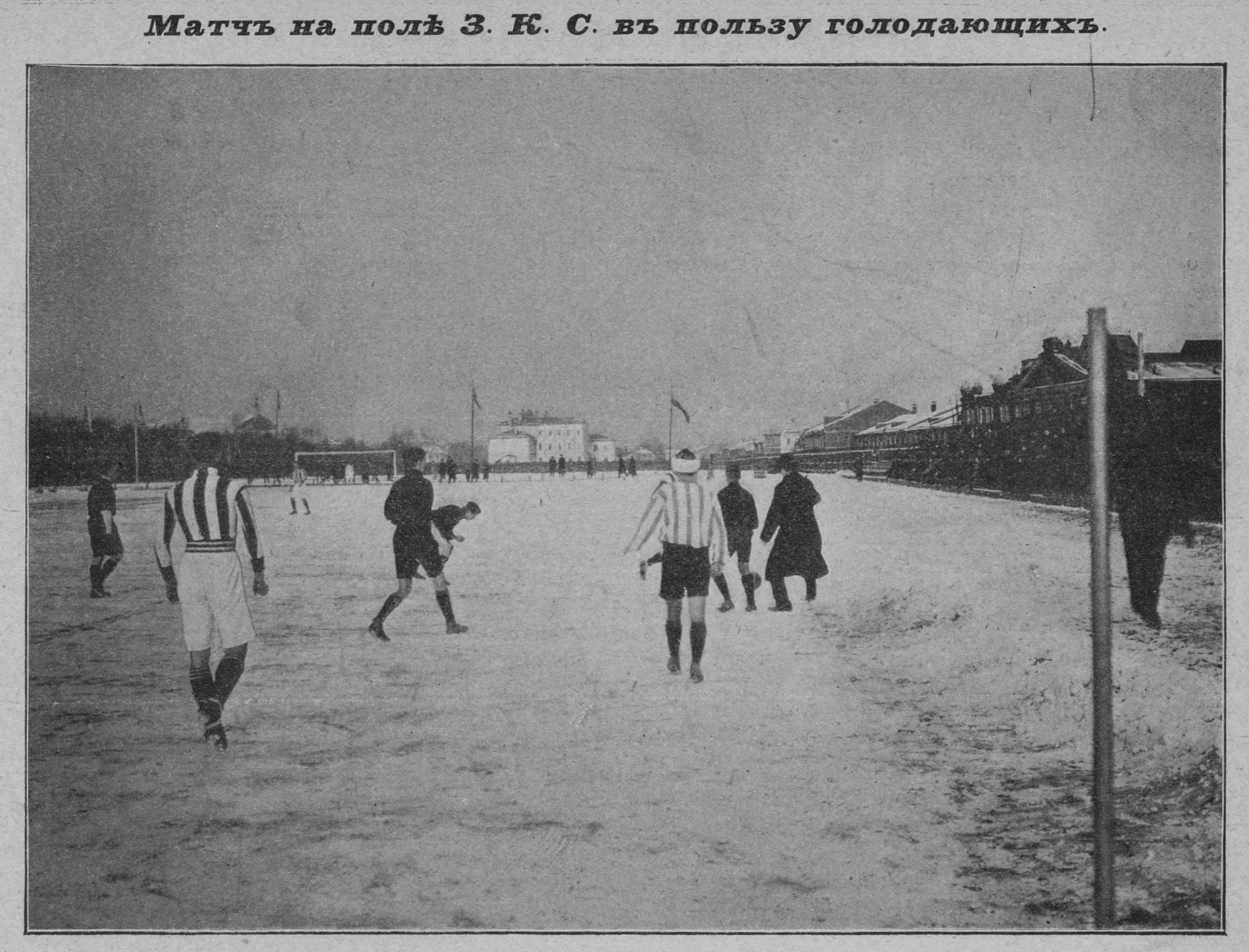
Charity match at ZKS stadium in 1911

The Zamoskvoretsky Sports Club (Russian: Замоскворецкий клуб спорта abbreviated to ZKS) was a football team established in the Russian Empire in 1910 and disbanded in 1923. The team included Harry Newman and Mikhail Romm.

The ZKS team was originally based on Kuznetskaya Street in Zamoskvorechye. In 1910 the club moved to a new site on Bolshaya Kaluzhskaya Street opposite the Neskuchny Garden. The official opening took place on 11 April. The Allison family funded the football including, fencing, benches for spectators and changing rooms for players.
