= Morena Celarié =

Salvadoran folk dancer

- Born: April 20, 1922; San Salvador
- Died: April 21, 1972 (aged 50); Puerta del Diablo, Panchimalco
- Occupation: Folk dancer

Morena Celarié (April 20, 1922 – April 22, 1972) was a Salvadoran folk dancer. She was born in San Salvador and began her dancing career at a young age. Celarié performed throughout the Western world and founded a folk dancing school in her native country. When cured of paralysis in one of her legs after a promise to the Virgin of Guadalupe, she dressed only in white until her death.

== Biography ==
Morena Celarié was born on April 20, 1922, in the San José neighborhood of San Salvador, El Salvador. She began dancing at four years of age and found herself the student of Antonia Portillo de Galindo, a guest of María de Sellarés in Guatemala, and Luis Marné, who filmed Celarié at a farm in San Salvador, footage shown in the United States and documented by National Geographic via article. Celarié's public performances were attended by Salvadorans like Francisco Morán and writer Edilberto Torres, who wrote that she "has done more for El Salvador than many ambassadors." On one occasion, she danced at an event hosted by César Tolentino, then ambassador of the Dominican Republic to El Salvador.

Celarié obtained a scholarship to study in Mexico City at the Palacio de Bellas Artes and while still in Mexico led 300 dancers of the Junior Chamber of San Salvador in Cándido Flamenco's La Suaca from the school and into the city.

In 1961, Celarié founded a dance group under her own name that had among its members Tomasa Cuestas Paz, Irma Méndez, Victoria Jovel Dueñaz, Mauricio Paredes, Vicente Aguiluz Orellana, Aquiles Amaya, Rubén Silva and José Anzoátegui. She would be placed in charge of events held by the Salvadoran Ministry of Tourism and receive honors from Julio Adalberto Rivera Carballo, Domingo Antonio de Lara School in Mexico City, and the Institute of the Mexican Youth. During her career, she performed throughout Central America, in New York City, and in Bonn. In Costa Rica, she earned the nickname "Morena de Cuscatlán." When she returned to San Salvador, she founded the Folk Dance Academy and organized free presentations and shows for schools and rehabilitation centers.

== Death ==
On the morning of her 50th birthday, Morena Celarié disappeared. She was found dead near the village of Panchimalco at the bottom of a cliff below the Puerta del Diablo mountain. Local police concluded that she had been thrown off the cliff, although her relatives said that she had been depressed after losing money on an investment that she had made to maintain her dance group.
