= United Zinc & Chemical Co. v. Britt =

- Supreme Court of the United States

Submitted March 13, 1922 Decided March 27, 1922
- Full case name: United Zinc & Chemical Co. v. Britt
- Citations: 258 U.S. 268 (more) 42 S. Ct. 299; 66 L. Ed. 615

Case history
- Prior: Kans.Gen.Stats., 1915, §7323, 7324; 264 F.7d 5 (8th Cir.)

Holding
- Judgement reversed.

Court membership
- Chief Justice William H. Taft Associate Justices Joseph McKenna · Oliver W. Holmes Jr. William R. Day · Willis Van Devanter; Mahlon Pitney · James C. McReynolds; Louis Brandeis · John H. Clarke

Case opinions
- Majority: Holmes
- Dissent: Clarke, joined by Taft, Day

United Zinc & Chemical Co. v. Britt, 258 U.S. 268 (1922), was a case decided by the Supreme Court of the United States that limited liability for landowners regarding injuries to child trespassers.

== Holding ==
The court held that a landowner was not liable under the attractive nuisance doctrine if the child had not been attracted to the land by the condition that injured him. This case has since been overturned.
