= 2026 Kerry Club Football Championship =

Gaelic football tournament season

Tournament details
- County: Kerry
- Year: 2026
- Trophy: Michael O'Connor Cup
- Sponsor: Kerry Petroleum
- Date: 7 August - 31 October
- Teams: 10
- Defending champions: Dr Crokes

Winners
- Champions: Rathmore (2nd win)
- Manager: Aidan O'Mahony
- Captain: Dan Murphy

Runners-up
- Runners-up: Dr Crokes
- Manager: Edmund O'Sullivan
- Captain: David Shaw

Promotion/Relegation
- Promoted team(s): Fossa
- Relegated team(s): Spa

Other
- Website: http://www.kerrygaa.ie/

The 2026 Kerry Club Football Championship (known as the Kerry Petroleum Senior Club Football Championship for sponsorship reasons) was the latest edition of the Kerry Club Football Championship. The tournament consisted of Kerry GAA's 10 senior club teams, an increase of one from 2025. Dr Crokes were the defending champions having retained their title, as they won the championship for a record 10th time when they defeated Na Gaeil 0-20 to 1-12 in the 2025 Final. They reached the final again for a third year in-a-row but were beaten by Rathmore who won their second title. After 6 years in the championship Spa were relegated after losing the relegation play-off final to Templenoe.

== Format ==
As the number of teams in the championship had increased to 10 there was a change in format from 2025. The 10 teams were drawn into 3 groups with 1 containing 4 teams and the others 3. Each group was a single round-robin competition with the top 2 teams in each group advancing to the knockout phase. The winner of the 4-team group advanced to the semi-finals along with 1 of the other group winners. The other 4 qualifiers played in 2 quarter-finals with the winners advancing to the semi-finals.

The 3 clubs who finished bottom of each group advanced to the relegation play-offs. The bottom team in the 4-team group advanced direct to the final while the other 2 teams played in the semi-final. The semi-final winner would retain their senior status while the loser would play in the relegation final with the winner retaining their senior status and the loser being relegated to the Intermediate Championship for 2027.

== Teams ==
After an 8-year absence An Ghaeltacht return to the senior championship having won the 2025 Intermediate Championship.

Team	Location	Club's Divisional Side	In Championship since	Championship Titles	Last Championship Title
An Ghaeltacht	Gallarus	West Kerry	2026	3	2005
Austin Stacks	Tralee	St Brendan's	2025	6	2021
Dingle	Dingle	West Kerry	2005	2	2023
Dr Crokes	Killarney	East Kerry	1986	10	2025
Kenmare Shamrocks	Kenmare	Kenmare District	2017	1	1983
Milltown/Castlemaine	Milltown	Mid Kerry	2024	1	2004
Na Gaeil	Tralee	St Brendan's	2022	0	—
Rathmore	Rathmore	East Kerry	2023	1	2011
Spa	Killarney	East Kerry	2021	0	—
Templenoe	Templenoe	Kenmare District	2020	0	—

== Group Stage ==
=== Group 1 ===
Pos	Team	Pld	W	D	L	Diff	Pts	Qualification
1	Dr Crokes	3	3	0	0	+9	6	Advance to Semi-finals
2	Rathmore	3	2	0	1	0	4	Advance to Quarter-finals
3	Dingle	3	1	0	2	-2	2	
4	Spa	3	0	0	3	-7	0	Advance to relegation play-off final

Source:Kerry GAA Fixtures/Results/Tables

Round 1

7 August 2026 Round 1	Dr Crokes	0–21 (21) – (17) 2–11	Spa
19:00 IST (UTC+1)		(HT: 0–12 - 1–06)		Venue: Fitzgerald Stadium
	Pts: C McMahon 7 (1tp, 2fs), D Shaw 6 (1tpf, 1tp, 1f), C Keating 3, T Doyle 2, G White, M Burns, A Hennigan 1 each	Report	Gls: D Spillane 2 Pts: C Murphy 3 (1f), D Moynihan 2 (1tp), D Spillane 2, E Cronin 1 (1f), D O'Donoghue, M Foley, J McCarthy 1 each	Referee: P Dowling (Ballylongford)

8 August 2026 Round 1	Rathmore	1–19 (22) – (20) 0–20	Dingle
19:30 IST (UTC+1)		(HT: 1–08 - 0–10)		Venue: Austin Stack Park
	Gls: C Collins; Pts: J Darmody 5 (1tp, 1f), A Dineen 4 (1tp), F Murphy 3, C Collins 2 (1tpf), M Reen 2 (1tp), D Nagle, J Moynihan, A Moynihan 1 each	Report	Pts: P Geaney 10 (3fs, 2tp), C Flannery, N Geaney 2 (1tp), T O'Sullivan, A O'Connor, Billy O'Connor, T de Brún, Brian O'Connor, R McCarthy 1 each	Referee: S Joy (Laune Rangers)

Round 2

16 August 2026 Round 2	Rathmore	0–18 (18) – (16) 0–16	Spa
13:00 IST (UTC+1)		(HT: 0–07 - 0–11)		Venue: Rathmore
	Pts: J Darmody 4 (1f, 1tpf), P Murphy 3 (1tp), C Ryan, M Reen 3 each, D Nagle 2, A Moynihan, M Ryan, J Moynihan 1 each	Report	Pts: E Cronin 4 (1f, 1tpf), C Murphy 4 (2tp), D O'Donoghue 2 (1tp), S Cronin, D Moynihan 2 each, D Spillane 1	Referee: P Hayes (Kerins O'Rahilly's)

16 August 2026 Round 2	Dingle	1–16 (19) – (20) 2–14	Dr Crokes
15:30 IST (UTC+1)		(HT: 0–08 - 1–10)		Venue: Dingle
	Gls: C Geaney; Pts: P Geaney 6 (2tp, 2fs), C Flannery 2, S Moran, N Geaney, T de Brún, A O'Connor, D Geaney, N Ryan, BD O'Sullivan, C Geaney 1 each	Report	Gls: C McMahon 2 (1p); Pts: C McMahon 3 (2fs), D Shaw 2 (1tpf), C Keating 2, E Looney, G White, B Looney, M Burns, T Doyle, B Courtney, A Hennigan 1 each	Referee: B Griffin (Clounmacon)

Round 3

22 August 2026 Round 3	Dr Crokes	0–16 (16) – (12) 0–12	Rathmore
18:30 IST (UTC+1)		(HT: 0–11 - 0–08)		Venue: Lewis Road
		Report		Referee: S Mulvihill (St Senan's)

23 August 2026 Round 3	Spa	2–17 (23) – (24) 1–21	Dingle
13:00 IST (UTC+1)		(HT: 1–13 - 1–16)		Venue: Tullig
	Gls: S Cronin, D Moynihan 1 each Pts: E Cronin 5 (1f), D O'Donoghue 4 (2tp), J McCarthy 3 (1f), C Murphy 2 (1f), S Cronin 2, C Spillane 1	Report	Gls: T O'Sullivan; Pts: D Geaney 7 (2tp), P Geaney 4 (3fs), N Geaney 3, B O'Sullivan, C Bambbury 2 each, T O'Sullivan, C Geaney 1 (1f) each, M Flaherty 1	Referee: S Joy (Laune Rangers)

=== Group 2 ===
Pos	Team	Pld	W	D	L	Diff	Pts	Qualification
1	Austin Stacks	2	1	1	0	+8	3	Advance to Quarter-finals
2	Kenmare Shamrocks	2	1	1	0	+3	3	Advance to Quarter-finals
3	Templenoe	2	0	0	2	-11	0	Advance to relegation play-off semi-final

Source:Kerry GAA Fixtures/Results/Tables

Round 1

9 August 2026 Round 1	Austin Stacks	0–18 (18) – (10) 0–10	Templenoe
16:00 IST (UTC+1)		(HT: 0–09 - 0–01)		Venue: Connolly Park
	Pts: R Carroll 4, C Horan 2 (1tpf), A Heinrich, J O'Connor, C Purcell 2 each, M O'Donnell 1 (1f), M Tansley 1 (1'45), J Nagle, D Casey, D Kirby, E Carroll 1 each	Report	Pts: K Spillane 3 (1tpf), G Crowley 3 (1tp), A Crowley 2 (1tp), P Spillane, A Spillane 1 each	Referee: F Clifford (Listry)

Round 2

15 August 2026 Round 2	Kenmare Shamrocks	1–19 (22) – (22) 2–16	Austin Stacks
19:00 IST (UTC+1)		(HT: 0–10 - 0–09)		Venue: Kenmare
	Gls: S O'Shea; Pts: S O'Shea 7 (2tpf, 2fs), T Murnane 4, E McCarthy 2 (2fs), K Fitzgibbon 1 (1'45), Z O'Shea, J Lehane, J O'Sullivan, D O'Sullivan, D Hallissey 1 each	Report	Gls: C Purcell, R O'Driscoll 1 each Pts: J O'Connor 5 (1tp), C Horan 3 (2fs), M O'Donnell 3 (1tp), E Carroll 2, D Casey, S O'Callaghan, R Carroll 1 each	Referee: S Mulvihill (St Senan's)

Round 3

23 August 2026 Round 3	Templenoe	1–17 (20) – (23) 2–17	Kenmare Shamrocks
14:00 IST (UTC+1)		(HT: 1–08 - 1–05)		Venue: Templenoe
	Gls: G Crowley; Pts: K Spillane 7 (4fs), B Crowley 3, A Crowley 2 (1'45), M Casey, P Spillane 2 each, G Crowley 1	Report	Gls: T Murnane 2 Pts: S O'Shea 5 (3fs), P O'Connor 3, J Lehane, D O'Sullivan, S O'Brien 2 each, Z O'Shea, J O'Sullivan 1 each	Referee: E Horan (Glenflesk)

=== Group 3 ===
Pos	Team	Pld	W	D	L	Diff	Pts	Qualification
1	Na Gaeil	2	1	0	1	+2	2	Advance to Semi-finals
2	Milltown/Castlemaine	2	1	0	1	0	2	Advance to Quarter-finals
3	An Ghaeltacht	2	1	0	1	-2	2	Advance to relegation play-off semi-final

Source:Kerry GAA Fixtures/Results/Tables

Round 1

7 August 2026 Round 1	Milltown/Castelmaine	0–11 (11) – (14) 1–11	An Ghaeltacht
19:00 IST (UTC+1)		(HT: 0–06 - 1–03)		Venue: Milltown
	Pts: E O'Connor 5 (1tpf, 1tp, 1f), P Wren 3, D Quirke, B Casey, D Hogan 1 each	Report	Gls: F Sauerland; Pts: C Ó Beaglaoich 3 (1tp, 1f), D Ó Sé 2 (1tpf), C MacGearailt 2 (2fs), T Ó Sé 2, D Ó Beaglaoich, C Ó Riagáin 1 each	Referee: B Brosnan (Glenflesk)

Round 2

15 August 2026 Round 2	Na Gaeil	1–10 (13) – (16) 1–13	Milltown/Castelmaine
16:00 IST (UTC+1)		(HT: 1–08 - 0–06)		Venue: Killeen
	Gls: J Doyle; Pts: L Cooper 7 (3fs), R Ó hAiniféin, D Reen, J Bourke 1 each	Report	Gls: M Lynch; Pts: É O'Connor 4 (3fs, 1'45), G Horan, D Hogan 3 each, S Hogan 2, B Casey 1	Referee: P O'Sullivan (Firies)

Round 3

23 August 2026 Round 3	An Ghaeltacht	0–09 (9) – (14) 2–08	Na Gaeil
16:00 IST (UTC+1)		(HT: 0–04 - 1–04)		Venue: Gallarus
	Pts: R Ó Beaglaoich 3 (2fs), B Ó Beaglaoich, C Ó Beaglaoich 2 (1tp) each, P Ó Sé, T Ó Sé 1 each	Report	Gls: L Cooper, L Ó hAiniféin 1 each Pts: L Cooper 2 (2fs), J Doyle 2 (1tp), D Goggin 2, S Okunbor, J O'Connor 1 each	Referee: B Brosnan (Glenflesk)

== Knockout Stage ==
=== Quarter-finals ===
5 September 2026
15:00 IST (UTC+1)
Quarter-final 1

Report

Kenmare Shamrocks	0–20 (20) – (23) 0–23	Milltown/Castlemaine
(HT: 0–07 - 0–07)
Pts: P O'Connor 5 (2fs), T Murnane 5, E McCarthy 3 (1f), S O'Shea 2 (1f), J Lehane 2, J McCarthy, D Ciuciu, J Tangney 1 each		Pts: É O'Connor 4 (2fs), G Horan 4, D Hogan 3 (1tp), P Wren 3, B Casey, K Kerins 2 each, D Roche, D Quirke, D O'Neill, G McKenna, S Hogan 1 each

Fitzgerald Stadium
Referee: P Hayes (Kerins O'Rahilly's)

5 September 2026
17:00 IST (UTC+1)
Quarter-final 2

Report

Rathmore	1–14 (17) – (16) 0–16	Austin Stacks
(HT: 1–06 - 0–10)
Gls: A Dineen; Pts: C Ryan 3 (1tp), A Dineen, M Ryan 2 (1tp) each, F Murphy 2, C Collins 1 (1f), P Murphy, A Moynihan, J Darmody, B Friel 1 each		Pts: C Horan 7 (2tpf, 3fs), D Casey, R O'Driscoll, R Carroll 2 each, P Lane 1 (1f), D Kirby, G Horan 1 each

Fitzgerald Stadium
Referee: S Joy (Laune Rangers)

=== Semi-finals ===
12 September 2026
16:00 IST (UTC+1)
Semi-final 1

Report

Milltown/Castlemaine	0–11 (11) – (27) 2–21	Rathmore
(HT: 0–02 - 1–11)
Pts: É O'Connor 4 (2fs, 1tpf), B Casey 2, M Lynch, D Roche, D Hogan, K Kerins, C Griffin 1 each		Gls: F Murphy, M Reen 1 each Pts: C Collins 4 (1tp, 1f), C Ryan 3 (1tp), M Ryan 3, B O'Keeffe 2 (2fs), P Murphy 2 (1tp), P Moynihan, M Reen 2 each, A Dineen, F Murphy, B Friel 1 each

Dirreen
Referee: P Dowling (Ballylongford)

13 September 2026
13:00 IST (UTC+1)
Semi-final 2

Report

Na Gaeil	2–22 (28) – (28) 1–25 (a.e.t.)	Dr Crokes
(HT: 1–05 - 0–08) (FT: 2–12 - 0–18)
Gls: D Goggin, O Maunsell 1 each Pts: D Carmody 7 (2tp, 1tpf, 1f), L Cooper 3 (1tpf), J Doyle 3 (1tp), P Doyle 2 (1tp), F Barry 2, D O'Connor, S Okunbor, D Goggin, D Reen, J Bourke 1 each		Gls: T Brosnan; Pts: T Brosnan 7 (2fs), M Burns 4 (1tp), C McMahon 4 (1f), B Looney 3 (1tp), D Shaw 3, M O'Shea 2 (1tp), G O'Shea, T Doyle 1 each

Castleisland
Referee: P Curtin (Brosna)

Dr Crokes win 4-2 on penalties

=== Final ===
20 September 2026
15:30 IST (UTC+1)
Final

Report

Rathmore	2–10 (16) – (12) 0–12	Dr Crokes
(HT: 1–04 - 0–06)
Gls: F Murphy, J Moynihan 1 each Pts: B O'Keeffe 3 (1tp, 1f), D Nagle, A Dineen, F Murphy, C Collins, B Friel, J Moynihan 1 each		Pts: T Brosnan 8 (2fs, 1'45), M Burns 2 (1tp), C McMahon 2

Fitzgerald Stadium
Referee: P Hayes (Kerins O'Rahilly's)

Source: Kerry GAA Fixtures/Results/Tables

== Relegation play-offs ==
=== Semi-final ===
6 September 2026
14:00 IST (UTC+1)
Semi-final

Report

Templenoe	1–14 (17) – (18) 2–12	An Ghaeltacht
(HT: 1–02 - 2–07)
Gls: B Crowley; Pts: K Spillane 3 (3fs), B Crowley 3, P Spillane 2, G Crowley, S Sheehan, A Spillane 1 each		Gls: F Sauerland, D Ó Sé 1 each Pts: C Ó Beaglaoich 5 (2tp), R Ó Beaglaoich 3 (3fs), B Ó Beaglaoich 2, S Ó Gairbhí, D Ó Sé 1 each

Direen
Referee: E Horan (Glenflesk)

=== Play-off final ===
31 October 2026
13:30 WET (UTC+0)
Play-off final

Report

Spa	1–15 (18) – (20) 2–14	Templenoe
(HT: 1–11 - 1–04)
Gls: O O'Neill 1 Pts: C Murphy 2 (1f), L Kearney, D Moynihan, J McCarthy, L Spillane 2 (1tp) each, E Cronin, D Spillane 1 (1f), E Fitzgerald, S Cronin, N McCarthy 1 each		Gls: B Crowley, K Spillane 1 each Pts: K Spillane 3 (2fs), A Crowley 3 (1tp), A Spillane 3, S O'Sullivan 2, S Sheahan, B Crowley, P Spillane 1 each

Lewis Road
Referee: P Hayes (Kerins O'Rahilly's)

- Spa are relegated from the Senior championship

Source: Kerry GAA Fixtures/Results/Tables

== See also ==
- 2026 Kerry Senior Football Championship
- 2026 Kerry Intermediate Football Championship
