= 2026 Kerry Senior Football Championship =

125th Kerry Senior Football Championship

2026 Kerry SFC
Tournament details
- County: Kerry
- Year: 2026
- Trophy: Bishop Moynihan Cup
- Sponsor: Garvey's Supervalu
- Date: 19 September – 25 October
- Teams: 17
- Defending champions: Dingle

Winners
- Champions: Dr Crokes (15th win)
- Manager: Edmund O'Sullivan
- Captain: Tony Brosnan
- Qualify for: 2026 Munster Senior Club Football Championship

Runners-up
- Runners-up: Kenmare Shamrocks
- Manager: Peter O'Sullivan
- Captain: Stephen O'Brien

Promotion/Relegation
- Promoted team(s): Fossa

Other
- Website: https://www.kerrygaa.ie

The 2026 Kerry Senior Football Championship was the 125th edition of Kerry GAA's premier tournament for senior Gaelic football teams in County Kerry, Ireland. The tournament consisted of 17 teams (10 senior club teams and 7 divisional teams). The defending Champions were Dingle who won the Championship for a 7th time in 2025.

The winners of the championship were Dr Crokes and they will represent Kerry in the 2026 Munster Senior Club Football Championship.

== Format ==
The Championship was contested by 17 teams with the Divisional teams playing in two Preliminary Rounds which used a double elimination format. The club teams entered the championship at the First Round stage. The draw for the Preliminary Rounds was made on 31 August with 6 teams to play in the First Preliminary Round with the winners advancing to the First Round proper. The 3 losing teams along with the team that received a bye were to play in the Second Preliminary Round with the winners advancing to the First Round Proper.

The First Round was contested by the senior club teams and the Divisional qualifiers from the Preliminary rounds. The competition ran on a single elimination format from then on.

== Teams ==
An Ghaeltacht were promoted to the championship having won the 2025 Kerry Intermediate Football Championship.

Team	Location	Club/Division	Club's Divisional Side	Position in 2025	In championship since	Championship Titles	Last Championship Title
An Ghaeltacht	Gallarus	Club	West Kerry	N/A	2026	2	2003
Austin Stacks	Tralee	Club	St Brendan's	Runners-up	2025	13	2021
Dingle	Dingle	Club	West Kerry	Champions	2005	7	2025
Dr Crokes	Killarney	Club	East Kerry	1st Round	1986	14	2024
East Kerry	East Kerry	Division	N/A	Quarter-finals	1929	11	2023
Kenmare Shamrocks	Kenmare	Club	Kenmare District	Quarter-finals	2017	0	—
Mid Kerry	Mid Kerry	Division	N/A	Semi-finals	1947	4	2008
Milltown/Castlemaine	Milltown	Club	Mid Kerry	1st Round	2024	0	—
Na Gaeil	Tralee	Club	St Brendan's	1st Round	2022	0	—
North Kerry	North Kerry	Division	N/A	1st Round	2025	0	—
Rathmore	Rathmore	Club	East Kerry	Semi-finals	2023	0	—
South Kerry	South Kerry	Division	N/A	1st Round	1930	10	2015
Spa	Killarney	Club	East Kerry	Quarter-finals	2021	0	—
St Brendan's	Tralee	Division	N/A	2nd Prelim. Rnd		0	—
St Kieran's	Castleisland	Division	N/A	2nd Prelim. Rnd	1988	1	1988
Templenoe	Templenoe	Club	Kenmare District	1st Round	2020	0	—
West Kerry	West Kerry	Division	N/A	Quarter-finals	1930	3	1990

== Preliminary stage ==
=== Preliminary Round 1 ===
19 September 2026
16:00 IST (UTC+1)
Prelim. Rnd 1

Report

West Kerry	0–21 (21) – (20) 2–14	St Brendan's
(HT: 2–08 - 0–09)
Pts: C O'Grady 6 (1tp, 2fs), M Scanlon 3 (1tp), C Kennedy, K Falvey 3 each, C Ferriter 2, T Pierse 1 (1'45), C Moriarty, C O'Connell, J Crean 1 each		Gls: O Ferris, D O'Connor 1 each Pts: S Broderick 3 (1tpf, 1'45), C Hayes 3, D O'Connor 2 (1f), S Moloney, E McElligott, G White, J Linehan, O Ferris, T Kennedy 1 each

Annascaul
Referee: P O'Sullivan (Firies)

20 September 2026
13:00 IST (UTC+1)
Prelim. Rnd 1

Report

St Kieran's	3–17 (26) – (18) 2–12	South Kerry
(HT: 1–04 - 0–06)
Gls: K Dennehy, J Joy, D Daly 1 each Pts: A Barry 7 (1tpf, 2fs), A O'Donoghue 3 (1tpf), C Brosnan 2, P O'Connor 1 (1f), J McElligott, S O'Connell, J O'Sullivan, K Dennehy 1 each		Gls: K O'Sullivan, A Coffey 1 each Pts: A Murphy 6 (3tpf), E Daly 2 (2fs), O Breen 2, C Farley 1 (1f), G O'Sullivan 1

Brosna
Referee: F Clifford (Laune Rangers)

20 September 2026
13:45 IST (UTC+1)
Prelim. Rnd 1

Report

Mid Kerry	2–14 (20) – (19) 1–16	North Kerry
(HT: 2–04 - 0–08)
Gls: A O'Neill, L Carey 1 each Pts: F Hallissey 7 (3fs, 1tpf, 1'45), E Clifford 2 (1tp), D O'Connor, A O'Neill, C Kennedy, L Carey, D Cleary 1 each		Gls: D Lynch 1 Pts: D Lynch 4 (1tpf, 1tp), K O'Connor 2 (1tpf), E Healy, C Trant, R Stack, J Brosnan 2 aech, P Walsh, C Dillon 1 each

Beaufort
Referee: E Horan (Glenflesk)

Bye: East Kerry

=== Preliminary Round 2 ===
25 September 2026
20:00 IST (UTC+1)
Prelim. Rnd 2

Report

South Kerry	1–18 (21) – (17) 1–14	East Kerry
(HT: 0–06 - 0–08)
Gls: K O'Sullivan; Pts: A Murphy 6 (3tpf), D O'Sullivan 5 (3fs), A Coffey 2, E Daly 1 (1f), S O'Connor, D Casey, R O'Shea, C Farley 1 each		Gls: D Roche; Pts: L Crowley 4 (1tp), P O'Leary 3, E O'Shea 2 (2fs), S O'Leary, R Buckley, J Horgan, K McCarthy, D Roche 1 each

Austin Stack Park
Referee: P Dowling (Ballylongford)

26 September 2026
16:00 IST (UTC+1)
Prelim. Rnd 2

Report

St Brendan's	0–09 (9) – (18) 2–12	North Kerry
(HT: 0–08 - 2–06)
Pts: G White 5 (2tpf, 1f), J Linehan 2 (1tpf), T Kennedy 1 (1f), E McElligott 1		Gls: M Kelly, R Stack 1 each Pts: K O'Connor 4 (2tpf), R O'Connell 2 (1f), J Brosnan 2, G O'Keeffe, R Stack, C Trant, D Lynch 1 each

Ballymacelligott
Referee: D Clifford (Lanue Rangers)

Note:
East Kerry still advance to the First Round proper despite losing to South Kerry as each Divisional team is guaranteed 2 matches

Source: Kerry GAA Fixtures/Results/Tables

== Knockout stage ==
The draw for the First Round proper of the championship was made on 26 September after the completion of the Preliminary stage. The draw for the Quarter-finals was made on Sunday, 4 October, with the semi-final draw being made on 11 October. The final is scheduled for 25 October.

=== First Round ===
3 October 2026
14:00 IST (UTC+1)
Round 1

Report

Rathmore	2–14 (20) – (19) 0–19	St Kieran's
(HT: 2–07 - 0–05)
Gls: D Nagle, M Ryan 1 each Pts: A Dineen 4 (1tp), C Collins 3, B O'Keeffe 1 (1f), D Nagle, P Murphy, A Moynihan, M Ryan, F Murphy, M Reen 1 each		Pts: A O'Donoghue 6 (2tp), A Barry 4 (1tpf, 1f), S O'Connell 4 (2tp), K Dennehy 2, P O'Connor, C Brosnan, C McElligott 1 each

Fitzgerald Stadium
Referee: E Ó Muircheartaigh (Dingle)

3 October 2026
15:00 IST (UTC+1)
Round 1

Report

Dr Crokes	1–20 (23) – (12) 0–12	South Kerry
(HT: 0–11 - 0—10)
Gls: T Brosnan 1 Pts: T Brosnan 5 (1tpf, 1f), C McMahon 4 (1tp), D Shaw 3 (1tp), M Burns 3, B Looney, A Hennigan 2 each, G White 1		Pts: D O'Sullivan 3 (1tp), A Murphy 2 (1tpf), E Daly 2 (2fs), C O'Donoghue, R O'Shea, G O'Sullivan, E Murphy, M Sugrue 1 each

Killorglin
Referee: S Joy (Laune Rangers)

3 October 2026
16:00 IST (UTC+1)
Round 1

Report

Milltown/Castlemaine	1–10 (13) – (32) 5–17	Austin Stacks
(HT: 0–05 - 1–12)
Gls: B Casey 1 (p); Pts: É O'Connor 5 (5fs), D Hogan 3 (1f, 1'45), B Casey 2		Gls: C Purcell 2 (1p), J Murphy, J O'Connor, P Lane 1 each Pts: P Lane 7 (1tpf, 3fs), B Murphy 4, E Carroll, R O'Driscoll 2 each, J Murphy, A Heinrich 1 each

Fitzgerald Stadium
Referee: E Horan (Glenflesk)

3 October 2026
17:00 IST (UTC+1)
Round 1

Report

East Kerry	1–12 (15) – (14) 1–11	Mid Kerry
(HT: 1–05 - 1–05)
Gls: D Clifford 1 Pts: D Clifford 6 (1tpf, 1f, 1tp), L crowley 3, C Lynch, P Clifford, P O'Leary 1 each		Gls: L Carey 1 Pts: S Gannon 3, E Clifford, A O'Neill, C Kennedy 2 each, L Evans, S Evans 1 each

Austin Stack Park
Referee: S Mulvihill (St Senan's)

3 October 2026
19:15 IST (UTC+1)
Round 1

Report

Dingle	1–11 (14) – (20) 1–17	Spa
(HT: 1–05 - 0–12)
Gls: C Bambury 1 Pts: D Geaney 4, P Geaney 3 (1tpf, 1f), N Geaney 2 (1tp), M Geaney 2		Gls: C Murphy 1 Pts: E Cronin 5 (1tpf, 1f), D Moynihan 5 (1tp), C Murphy 3 (1tp), M Foley 2, L Kearney, L Spillane 1 each

Austin Stack Park
Referee: P Hayes (Kerins O'Rahilly's)

4 October 2026
13:30 IST (UTC+1)
Round 1

Report

Kenmare Shamrocks	4–18 (30) – (15) 1–12	West Kerry
(HT: 3–07 - 1–03)
Gls: S O'Shea, D O'Sullivan, P O'Connor, J Tangney 1 each Pts: S O'Shea 6 (2fs, 1tp), D O'Sullivan 5 (1tp), D O'Connor 2, J McCarthy, K O'Sullivan, E McCarthy, D Hallissey, J Tangney 1 each		Gls: M O'Connell 1 Pts: C O'Grady 5 (3fs, 1tpf), M O'Connell 3 (1f), P Mannion 2, M Mannion 1 (1f)

Fitzgerald Stadium
Referee: C O'Connor (Glenbeigh/Glencar)

4 October 2026
14:30 IST (UTC+1)
Round 1

Report

Na Gaeil	0–11 (11) – (22) 2–16	North Kerry
(HT: 0–07 - 0–06)
Pts: D O'Connor 4 (1tp), D Reen 3 (1f, 1tp), L Cooper 2 (2fs), D Burke 1 (1f), A Barry 1		Gls: E Healy 2 Pts: C Dillon 7 (1f, 1tp), D Lynch 4, K O'Connor 2 (1tpf), R O'Connell 1 (1f), P Walsh, M Kelly 1 each

Austin Stack Park
Referee: E Walsh (Rathmore)

4 October 2026
15:30 IST (UTC+1)
Round 1

Report

Templenoe	0–15 (15) – (17) 0–17 (a.e.t.)	An Ghaeltacht
(HT: 0–04 - 0–04) (FT: 0–10 - 0–10)
Pts: K Spillane 6 (2fs), A Crowley 3 (1tpf, 1f), A Spillane 2, S O'Sullivan 1 (1f), T Morley, G Crowley, J Spillane 1 each		Pts: C MacGearailt 5 (3fs, 1tpf), B Ó Beaglaoich, D Ó Beaglaoich 2 each, R Ó Beaglaoich 1 (1f), A Ó Beaglaoich, D Ó Sé, C Corrdubh, G Ó Cinnéide 1 each

Fitzgerald Stadium
Referee: G Kelliher (Beaufort)

=== Quarter-finals ===
10 October 2026
17:00 IST (UTC+1)
Quarter-final

Report

North Kerry	2–22 (28) – (17) 1–14	An Ghaeltacht
(HT: 1–15 - 0–08)
Gls: E Healy, D Lynch 1 each Pts: C Dillon 6 (1f), J Kennelly 6 (2tp), R O'Connor 4 (2tp), D Lynch 3 (1tp), K O'Connor 1 (1'45), P Walsh, E Healy 1 each		Gls: C Ó Beaglaoich 1 Pts: B Ó Beaglaoich 5 (2tp), C Ó Beaglaoich 4 (1tp), PJ MacLáimh 2 (1tp), R Ó Beaglaoich 1 (1f), A Ó Beaglaoich, S Ó Conchúir 1 each

Austin Stack Park
Referee: B Brosnan (Glenflesk)

10 October 2026
19:15 IST (UTC+1)
Quarter-final

Report

Dr Crokes	3–26 (35) – (30) 3–21	Austin Stacks
(HT: 2–10 - 1–13)
Gls: C McMahon 2, G White 1 Pts: C Keating 7 (3tp), D Shaw 5 (1tp), T Brosnan 4 (1tpf, 2fs), C McMahon 4 (1tp, 1f), E Looney 2, B Looney, A Hennigan 1 each		Gls: R O'Driscoll, C Purcell, P Lane 1 each Pts: D Kirby 6 (1tp), G Horan 4 (1tp), P Lane 3 (1f), M O'Donnell 2 (1tp), E Carroll 2, J Murphy, J O'Connor, C Purcell, G Casey 1 each

Austin Stack Park
Referee: E Ó Muircheartaigh (Dingle)

11 October 2026
13:30 IST (UTC+1)
Quarter-final

Report

Rathmore	1–12 (15) – (22) 1–19	Kenmare Shamrocks
(HT: 0–04 - 0–12)
Gls: D Nagle 1 Pts: A Dineen 4 (1tp), P Murphy, M Reen 2 each, B O'Keeffe, C Collins 1 (1f) each, C Ryan, B Friel 1 each		Gls: T Murnane 1 Pts: S O'Shea 10 (3tpf, 2fs, 1tp), D O'Sullivan 2 (1f), K O'Sullivan, T Murnane 2 each, J McCarthy, D O'Connor, J Tangney 1 each

Fitzgerald Stadium
Referee: P Hayes (Kerins O'Rahilly's)

11 October 2026
15:30 IST (UTC+1)
Quarter-final

Report

East Kerry	2–17 (23) – (24) 3–15	Spa
(HT: 1–10 - 0–06)
Gls: D Clifford 2 Pts: D Clifford 4 (3fs), R Buckley 4, P Clifford 2 (1tpf), D Roche 2 (1f), C Lynch 2, E Talbot, D Lyne, L Crowley 1 each		Gls: D Spillane 2 (1p), S Cronin 1 Pts: E Cronin 4 (1tpf, 1f), C Murphy 4 (1tp), D O'Donoghue, L Kearney, D Moynihan, D Spillane, M Horgan, J McCarthy, L Spillane 1 each

Fitzgerald Stadium
Referee: P Dowling (Ballylongford)

=== Semi-finals ===
18 October 2026
13:30 IST (UTC+1)
Semi-final

Report

North Kerry	0–09 (9) – (15) 0–15	Kenmare Shamrocks
(HT: 0–03 - 0–06)
Pts: D Lynch 4 (1tpf, 1f), C Dillon 3 (3fs), J Kennelly, T O'Connell 1 each		Pts: S O'Shea 8 (1tpf, 1tp, 3fs), T Murnane 2, L O'Sullivan, D Ciuciu, S O'Brien, E McCarthy, J Tangney 1 each

Fitzgerald Stadium
Referee: E Walsh (Rathmore)

18 October 2026
15:30 IST (UTC+1)
Semi-final

Report

Dr Crokes	1–20 (23) – (20) 3—11	Spa
(HT: 1–11 - 0–06)
Gls: T Brosnan 1 Pts: T Doyle, T Brosnan 4 (1f) each, A Hennigan 4, C McMahon 3, C Keating 2 (1tp), E Looney, G White, D Shaw 1 each		Gls: D Spillane 3 Pts: C Murphy 4 (2tp), D Moynihan 3, E Cronin 2 (2fs), L Kearney, D Spillane 1 each

Fitzgerald Stadium
Referee: S Joy (Laune Rangers)

=== Final ===
25 October 2026
14:00 WET (UTC+0)
Final

Report

Kenmare Shamrocks	2–14 (20) – (27) 1–24	Dr Crokes
(HT: 1–08 - 0–07)
Gls: D Ciuciu, K O'Sullivan 1 each Pts: S O'Shea 9 (3tpf, 2fs), D O'Sullivan 2, T Murnane, J Lehane, J O'Sullivan 1 each		Gls: M O'Shea 1 Pts: T Brosnan 7 (2tp, 2fs), D Shaw (2tp), A Henningan 3, T Doyle 2 (1tp), C McMahon 2, C Fitzgerald, C Keating, B Looney 1 each

Fitzgerald Stadium
Referee: S Joy (Laune Rangers)

== Championship statistics ==
=== Miscellaneous ===
- It was the first meeting of Kenmare Shamrocks and Dr Crokes in the Kerry Senior Football Championship Final
- Kenmare Shamrocks qualify for the final for the first time.
- Both Fionn Fitzgerald and Brian Looney won a record 9th winners medal.

Source: Kerry GAA Fixtures/Results/Tables

== See also ==
- 2026 Kerry Club Football Championship
- 2026 Kerry Intermediate Football Championship
