= 2025 Kerry Club Football Championship =

Gaelic football tournament season

Tournament details
- County: Kerry
- Year: 2025
- Trophy: Michael O'Connor Cup
- Sponsor: Kerry Petroleum
- Date: 8 August to 14 September
- Teams: 9
- Defending champions: Dr Crokes

Winners
- Champions: Dr Crokes (10th win)
- Manager: Andrew Kenneally
- Captain: David Shaw

Runners-up
- Runners-up: Na Gaeil
- Manager: Donal Rooney
- Captain: Andrew Barry

Promotion/Relegation
- Promoted team(s): An Ghaeltacht
- Relegated team(s): n/a

Other
- Matches played: 14
- Total scored: 30–395 (485)
- Website: http://www.kerrygaa.ie/

The 2025 Kerry Club Football Championship (known as the Kerry Petroleum Senior Club Football Championship for sponsorship reasons) was the 2025 edition of the Kerry Club Football Championship. The tournament consisted of Kerry GAA's 9 senior club teams, an increase of one from 2024. Dr Crokes retained their title, winning the championship for a record 10th time defeating final debutants Na Gaeil 0-20 to 1-12 in the Final.

== Format ==
As the championship has increased from 8 teams to 9, a new format is in place for 2025. The 9 teams were drawn into three groups of three teams with each team playing the other two teams, one at home and one away. Two group winners will advance to the semi-finals while the other group winner and all three runners-up will advance to the quarter-finals.

As the 2026 competition is also due to see an increase in the number of teams, there will be no relegation to the Intermediate Championship in 2025.

== Teams ==
Austin Stacks were promoted to the championship having won the 2024 Kerry Intermediate Football Championship.

| Team | Location | Club's Divisional Side | In Championship since | Championship Titles | Last Championship Title |
|---|---|---|---|---|---|
| Austin Stacks | Tralee | St Brendan's | 2025 | 6 | 2021 |
| Dingle | Dingle | West Kerry | 2005 | 2 | 2023 |
| Dr Crokes | Killarney | East Kerry | 1986 | 9 | 2024 |
| Kenmare Shamrocks | Kenmare | Kenmare District | 2017 | 1 | 1983 |
| Milltown/Castlemaine | Milltown | Mid Kerry | 2024 | 1 | 2004 |
| Na Gaeil | Tralee | St Brendan's | 2022 | 0 | — |
| Rathmore | Rathmore | East Kerry | 2023 | 1 | 2011 |
| Spa | Killarney | East Kerry | 2021 | 0 | — |
| Templenoe | Templenoe | Kenmare District | 2020 | 0 | — |

== Group Stage ==
=== Group 1 ===
| Pos | Team | Pld | W | D | L | Diff | Pts | Qualification |
|---|---|---|---|---|---|---|---|---|
| 1 | Na Gaeil | 2 | 2 | 0 | 0 | +11 | 4 | Advance to Semi-finals or Quarter-finals |
| 2 | Austin Stacks | 2 | 1 | 0 | 1 | +10 | 2 | Advance to Quarter-finals |
| 3 | Templenoe | 2 | 0 | 0 | 2 | -21 | 0 | |

Source: Kerry GAA Fixtures/Results/Tables

Round 1

| 9 August 2025 Round 1 | Austin Stacks | 1–18 (21) – (8) 1–05 | Templenoe | Connolly Park |
| 16:30 IST (UTC+1) | | (HT: 0–09 - 0–02) |
| | Gls: P Lane 1 Pts: A Heinrich 5, P Lane 4 (1tp), S Quilter 2 (1tp), D Kirby 2, R Shanahan, E Carroll, D O'Brien, F Mangan, S O'Callaghan 1 each | Report | Gls: A Spillane 1 Pts: G Crowley 2 (1tp), T Morley, C Crowley, K Spillane 1 each | Referee: B Griffin (Clounmacon) |

Round 2

| 15 August 2025 Round 2 | Na Gaeil | 1–15 (18) – (15) 1–12 | Austin Stacks | Killeen |
| 19:00 IST (UTC+1) | | (HT: 1–06 - 0–09) |
| | Gls: O Maunsell 1 Pts: D O'Connor 5 (2tp), D Devine 2 (2fs), E O'Connor, O Maunsell 2 each, J Barry, J O'Connor, K O'Connor, J Sheehan 1 each | Report | Gls: S Quilter 1 Pts: S Quilter 6 (1tpf, 1f, 1tp), J O'Connor, P Lane 2 (1tp) each, M Tansley 1 (1'45), A Heinrich 1 | Referee: P O'Sullivan (Firies) |

Round 3

| 23 August 2025 Round 3 | Templenoe | 1–10 (13) – (21) 1–18 | Na Gaeil | Templenoe |
| 18:00 IST (UTC+1) | | (HT: 0–08 - 1–07) |
| | Gls: G Crowley 1 Pts: K Spillane 7 (5fs), C Crowley 2 (1tpf), G Crowley 1 | Report | Gls: D O'Connor 1 Pts: D Devine 4 (3fs), O Maunsell 3, D O'Connor 2 (1f), J Doyle, J Barry 2 each, C Bohane 1 ('45), S Okunbor, F Barry, J Sheehan, K O'Connor 1 each | Referee: E Walsh (Rathmore) |

=== Group 2 ===
| Pos | Team | Pld | W | D | L | Diff | Pts | Qualification |
|---|---|---|---|---|---|---|---|---|
| 1 | Kenmare Shamrocks | 2 | 1 | 1 | 0 | +13 | 3 | Advance to Semi-finals or Quarter-finals |
| 2 | Dingle | 2 | 1 | 0 | 1 | -1 | 2 | Advance to Quarter-finals |
| 3 | Milltown/Castlemaine | 2 | 0 | 1 | 1 | -12 | 1 | |

Source: Kerry GAA Fixtures/Results/Tables

Round 1

| 10 August 2025 Round 1 | Kenmare Shamrocks | 2–20 (26) – (13) 0–13 | Dingle | Kenmare |
| 16:00 IST (UTC+1) | | (HT: 0–05 - 0–10) |
| | Gls: J McCarthy, T Murnane 1 each Pts: S O'Shea 8 (2tpf, 3fs), T Murnane, P O'Connor 3 each, Z O'Shea, J Tangney 2 each, T Cronin, D O'Sullivan 1 each | Report | Pts: C Geaney 6 (3fs, 1tp), D Geaney 3 (1tp), D O'Sullivan, T de Brún, N Ryan, C Bambury 1 each | Referee: B Brosnan (Glenflesk) |

Round 2

| 17 August 2025 Round 2 | Dingle | 1–19 (22) – (10) 0-10 | Milltown/Castlemaine | Dingle |
| 16:00 IST (UTC+1) | | (HT: 0–06 - 0–07) |
| | Gls: P Geaney 1 Pts: P Geaney 8 (1tp, 2tpf, 1f), C Bambury 7 (3fs), C Flannery, T de Brún, M Geaney, L de Brún 1 each | Report | Pts: E O'Connor 6 (2tpf, 1f), D Roche, B Casey, D Horgan, C Moriarty 1 each | Referee: E Horan (Glenflesk) |

Round 3

| 24 August 2025 Round 3 | Milltown/Castlemaine | 3–17 (26) – (26) 3–17 | Kenmare Shamrocks | Milltown |
| 13:00 IST (UTC+1) | | (HT: 1–08 - 1–08) |
| | Gls: G Horan, A Kelliher, C Moriarty 1 each Pts: E O'Connor 6 (2fs, 1'45, 1tp), D Hogan 4, B Casey, C Moriarty 2 each, P Wren, D Roche, O Spring 1 each | Report | Gls: K O'Sullivan, S O'Brien, D O'Sullivan 1 each Pts: S O'Brien 5 (1tp), S O'Shea 4 (1f, 2'45), D O'Sullivan 3, K O'Sullivan 2 (1f), T Murnane 2, J Tangney 1 | Referee: P Curtin (Brosna) |

=== Group 3 ===
| Pos | Team | Pld | W | D | L | Diff | Pts | Qualification |
|---|---|---|---|---|---|---|---|---|
| 1 | Dr Crokes | 2 | 2 | 0 | 0 | +9 | 4 | Advance to Semi-finals or Quarter-finals |
| 2 | Rathmore | 2 | 1 | 0 | 1 | +3 | 2 | Advance to Quarter-finals |
| 3 | Spa | 2 | 0 | 0 | 2 | -12 | 0 | |

Source: Kerry GAA Fixtures/Results/Tables

Round 1

| 8 August 2025 Round 1 | Spa | 0–13 (13) – (20) 2–14 | Dr Crokes | Tullig |
| 19:00 IST (UTC+1) | | (HT: 0–08 - 1–06) |
| | Pts: C Tobin 4 (4fs), E Cronin 3, D Moynihan 2, N McCarthy, M Foley, D Spillane, A Cronin 1 each | Report | Gls: G O'Shea, C McMahon 1 each Pts: T Brosnan 8 (1tpf, 3fs), D Shaw 3, G White, M Burns, B Looney 1 each | Referee: S Joy (Laune Rangers) |

Round 2

| 17 August 2025 Round 2 | Dr Crokes | 1–14 (17) – (15) 0-15 | Rathmore | Lewis Road |
| 12:45 IST (UTC+1) | | (HT: 0–06 - 0–05) |
| | Gls: A Hennigan 1 Pts: T Brosnan 5, D Shaw 4 (1tp, 1f), B Looney 3, M Burns 2 | Report | Pts: D Rahilly 4, C Collins 2 (2fs), S Ryan 2 (1tpf), C Ryan, J Moynihan 2 each, A Dineen, P Murphy, P Moynihan 1 each | Referee: P Hayes (Kerins O'Rahilly's) |

Round 3

| 24 August 2025 Round 3 | Rathmore | 2–15 (21) – (16) 2–10 | Spa | Rathmore |
| 16:00 IST (UTC+1) | | (HT: 2–07 - 1–07) |
| | Gls: P Murphy, C Collins 1 each Pts: D Rahilly, C Collins 3 each, A Dineen 2 (1tp), B Friel 2, S Ryan, P Moynihan, A Moynihan, D Nagle, M Reen 1 each | Report | Gls: D O'Donoghue, C Tobin 1 each Pts: C Tobin 4 (1tp, 1f), E Cronin 4, D Moynihan, D Spillane 1 each | Referee: S Mulvihill (St. Senan's) |

== Knockout stage ==
Group winners Dr Crokes and Kenmare Shamrocks received a bye to the semi-finals when the draw for the quarter-finals was made.

=== Quarter-finals ===
30 August 2025
17:00 IST (UTC+1)
Quarter-final

Report

| Dingle | 0–17 (17) – (18) 1–15 | Na Gaeil |
|---|---|---|
(HT: 0–02 - 1–10)
| Pts: P Geaney 12 (3tp, 3tpf), T de Brún 2 (1tp), C Flannery, T O'Sullivan, C Bambury 1 each | | Gls: D O'Connor 1 Pts: D Devine 4 (1tp, 2fs), J Sheehan 3 (1tp), J Barry, D O'Connor 2 each, N O'Mahony, A Barry, O Maunsell, K O'Connor 1 each |

Austin Stack Park
Referee: E Horan (Glenflesk)

30 August 2025
19:00 IST (UTC+1)
Quarter-final

Report

| Austin Stacks | 1–13 (16) – (18) 2–12 | Rathmore |
|---|---|---|
(HT: 1–05 - 0–03)
| Gls: C Purcell 1 Pts: P Lane 9 (1tpf, 2fs),C Purcell 2, G Horan, D Kirby 1 each | | Gls: C Collins 1 (1p), B Friel 1 Pts: S Ryan 3 (1tpf, 1'45), B O'Keeffe 2 (1tp), A Dineen B Friel, P Murphy, J Moynihan, C Collins, M Ryan, M Reen 1 each |

Austin Stack Park
Referee: B Griffin (Clounmacon)

=== Semi-finals ===
6 September 2025
17:30 IST (UTC+1)
Semi-final

Report

| Na Gaeil | 0–16 (16) – (15) 2–09 | Rathmore |
|---|---|---|
(HT: 0–07 - 2–02)
| Pts: D O'Connor 4 (1f), D Devine 3 (3fs), J Barry 3 (1tpf), C Bohane 2 (1tpf), J Sheehan 2, T Ó hAiniféin, D Reen 1 each | | Gls: C Collins, J Moynihan 1 each Pts: C Collins 3 (1f), S Ryan 2 (1tpf), A Dineen 2 (1tp), P Murphy, F Murphy 1 each |

Lewis Road
Referee: S Joy (Laune Rangers)

7 September 2025
15:30 IST (UTC+1)
Semi-final

Report

| Dr Crokes | 0–17 (17) – (12) 1–09 | Kenmare Shamrocks |
|---|---|---|
(HT: 0–11 - 0–04)
| Pts: T Brosnan 8 (1tpf), B Courtney 2 (2'45), M Burns, C McMahon 2 each, D Shaw, G O'Shea, T Doyle 1 each | | Gls: T Murnane 1 Pts: K O'Sullivan 2, D O'Sullivan (1f), D O'Connor, S O'Shea, S O'Brien, D O'Sullivan, T Murnane, P O'Connor 1 each |

Austin Stack Park
Referee: S Mulvihill (St Senan's)

=== Final ===
14 September 2025
15:30 IST (UTC+1)
Final

Report

| Na Gaeil | 1–12 (15) – (20) 0–20 | Dr Crokes |
|---|---|---|
(HT: 0–05 - 0–12)
| Gls: D O'Connor 1 Pts: J Sheehan 5 (1tp), D O'Connor 2, A Barry, N O'Mahony, J O'Connor, O Maunsell, S O'Connor 1 each | | Pts: T Brosnan 8, G White 6 (2tp), M Burns 2, T Doyle, C McMahon, B Looney, A Hennigan 1 each |

Austin Stack Park
Referee: B Griffin (Clounmacon)

== See also ==
- 2025 Kerry Intermediate Football Championship
- 2025 Kerry Senior Football Championship
