= 2025 Kerry Senior Football Championship =

124th Kerry Senior Football Championship

2025 Kerry SFC
Tournament details
- County: Kerry
- Year: 2025
- Trophy: Bishop Moynihan Cup
- Sponsor: Garvey's Supervalu
- Date: 20 September – 26 October
- Teams: 16
- Defending champions: Dr Crokes

Winners
- Champions: Dingle (7th win)
- Manager: Pádraig Corcoran
- Captain: Paul Geaney
- Qualify for: Munster Senior Club Football Championship

Runners-up
- Runners-up: Austin Stacks
- Manager: Darragh Long
- Captain: Ronan Shanahan

Promotion/Relegation
- Promoted team(s): An Ghaeltacht

Other
- Matches played: 18
- Total scored: 54–570 (732)
- Website: https://www.kerrygaa.ie

The 2025 Kerry Senior Football Championship was the 124th edition of Kerry GAA's premier tournament for senior Gaelic football teams in County Kerry, Ireland. The tournament consisted of 16 teams (9 senior club teams and 7 divisional teams). The defending Champions were Dr Crokes who won the Championship for a record 14th time in 2024. The losing finalists in 2024, Dingle won the championship for a 7th time. It was their first title in 77 years. They subsequently represented Kerry in the 2025 Munster Senior Club Football Championship.

== Format ==
Originally it was planned for the championship to involve 17 teams, however in April 2025 the Kerry County Board approved a proposal from Feale Rangers and Shannon Rangers to compete as a combined team (North Kerry) in the upcoming championship, thus reducing the number of Divisional sides to 7.

The Divisional teams played in two Preliminary Rounds which used a double elimination format. The club teams entered the championship at the First Round stage. The draw for the first preliminary round was made on 18 August. 6 teams were to play in the first preliminary round with the 3 winners advancing to the First Round. The 3 losers advanced to the second preliminary round along with the bye team and the 2 winners from this round also advanced to the First round.

Of the 14 teams remaining, 2 got a bye to the Quarter-finals and the rest played in the First round with the competition using a single elimination format from then on.

== Teams ==
Austin Stacks were promoted to the championship having won the 2024 Kerry Intermediate Football Championship.

Team	Location	Club/Division	Club's Divisional Side	Colours	Position in 2024	In championship since	Championship Titles	Last Championship Title
Austin Stacks	Tralee	Club	St Brendan's	Black and amber	N/A	2025	13	2021
Dingle	Dingle	Club	West Kerry	Red and white	Runner-up	2005	6	1948
Dr Crokes	Killarney	Club	East Kerry	Black and amber	Champions	1986	14	2024
East Kerry	East Kerry	Division	N/A	Red and white	Semi-finals	1929	11	2023
Kenmare Shamrocks	Kenmare	Club	Kenmare District	Black and red	Quarter-finals	2017	0	—
Mid Kerry	Mid Kerry	Division	N/A	Green and red	Round 3	1947	4	2008
Milltown/Castlemaine	Milltown	Club	Mid Kerry	Green and white	Round 3	2024	0	—
Na Gaeil	Tralee	Club	St Brendan's	White and green	Round 2	2022	0	—
North Kerry	North Kerry	Division	N/A	Black and white	N/A	2025	0	—
Rathmore	Rathmore	Club	East Kerry	Red and white	Quarter-finals	2023	0	—
South Kerry	South Kerry	Division	N/A	Green and gold	Round 2	1930	10	2015
Spa	Killarney	Club	East Kerry	Blue and gold	Round 3	2021	0	—
St Brendan's	Tralee	Division	N/A	Green, black and white	Semi-finals		0	—
St Kieran's	Castleisland	Division	N/A	Green and white	Quarter-finals	1988	1	1988
Templenoe	Templenoe	Club	Kenmare District	Blue and white	Quarter-finals	2020	0	—
West Kerry	West Kerry	Division	N/A	Red and white	Round 2	1930	3	1990

== Preliminary stage ==
=== Preliminary Round 1 ===
20 September 2025
16:00 IST (UTC+1)
Prelim. Rnd 1

Report

South Kerry	1–15 (18) – (20) 1–17	West Kerry
(HT: 1–08 - 1–07)
Gls: A Coffey 1 Pts: E Daly 5 (3fs, 1tpf), S Teahan 3 (2fs), I O'Sullivan 3, A Coffey 2 (1tp), Z Fayen 1		Gls: M O'Connell 1 Pts: C O'Grady 7 (4fs, 1tpf), C Ó Beaglaoich 4 (1tp), R Ó Beaglaoich 2, S Ó Cúinn, T O'Donnell, PJ MacLáimh, M O'Connell 1 each

Killorglin
Referee: D Clifford (Laune Rangers)

21 September 2025
14:00 IST (UTC+1)
Prelim. Rnd 1

Report

St Brendan's	0–10 (10) – (24) 2–18	Mid Kerry
(HT: 0–05 - 2–07)
Pts: D O'Connor 3 (2fs), T Kennedy 2 (1tp), J Foley, P White 2 each, B Hanafin 1		Gls: S Cleary, G Hassett 1 each Pts: C Kennedy 5 (1tp), D O'Connor, K Evans 3 each, E Clifford 2, J O'Connor 1 (f), L Carey, D Cleary, D Houlihan, C Teahan 1 each

Austin Stack Park
Referee: P Curtin (Brosna)

21 September 2025
16:00 IST (UTC+1)
Prelim. Rnd 1

Report

St Kieran's	1–10 (13) – (24) 2–18	East Kerry
(HT: 0–03 - 2–07)
Gls: A O'Donoghue 1 Pts: A O'Donoghue 5 (1tp, 2fs), A Barry 1 (f), J McElligott, L Brosnan, S O'Connell, M Reidy 1 each		Gls: D Clifford, Philip O'Leary 1 each Pts: P O'Shea 6 (1tp, 2fs), D Clifford 5 (1f), C Lynch, D O'Brien, D Lyne, Paudie O'Leary, Philip O'Leary, R O'Grady, M Keane 1 each

Austin Stack Park
Referee: JM Fitzgerald (Abbeydorney)

Bye: North Kerry

=== Preliminary Round 2 ===
28 September 2025
13:30 IST (UTC+1)
Prelim. Rnd 2

Report

South Kerry	4–20 (32) – (29) 1–26 (a.e.t.)	St Brendan's
(HT: 2–08 - 1–11) (FT: 3–13 - 1–19)
Gls: A Coffey, Donagh O'Sullivan, S Teahan, C Farley 1 each Pts: I O'Sullivan 7 (4fs), E Daly 6 (4fs, 1tpf), Donagh O'Sullivan 3, F O'Sullivan 2, S Teahan, Donncha O'Sullivan 1 each		Gls: D O'Connor 1 Pts: D O'Connor 10 (3fs), T Kennedy 5 (1tp), S Broderick 4 (2tpf), BJ Keane 3, J Foley, E Ferris, C Hayes, F O'Brien 1 each

Fitzgerald Stadium
Referee: G Kelliher (Beaufort)

28 September 2025
15:30 IST (UTC+1)
Prelim. Rnd 2

Report

North Kerry	3–16 (25) – (22) 2–16	St Kieran's
(HT: 1–12 - 0–04)
Gls: J Foley, JJ Grimes, C Dillon 1 each Pts: C Dillon 11 (3 tpf, 3fs), R O'Connell 2, E Healy, R Stack, C Trant 1 each		Gls: M Horan 2 Pts: S O'Connell 5 (1tp), A O'Donoghue 3 (1tp), A Barry 2 (2fs), C Brosnan 2, S Ó Ciardubhain 1 ('45), L Brosnan, K Dennehy, A Breen 1 each

Fitzgerald Stadium
Referee: F Clifford (Listry)

== Knock-out stage ==
=== First Round ===
4 October 2025
15:00 IST (UTC+1)
First Round

Report

Templenoe	1–10 (13) – (32) 3–23	East Kerry
(HT: 0–04 - 0–12)
Gls: S Sheehan 1 Pts: K Spillane 9 (1tpf, 4fs), A Crowley 1		Gls: R Murphy, Paudie O'Leary, P O'Shea 1 each Pts: R Murphy 6 (1tp), D Clifford 5 (2fs), P O'Shea 3, D O'Brien, E O'Shea 2 each, R Buckley, Paudie O'Leary, Philip O'Leary, C Gammell, M Keane 1 each

Beaufort
Referee: P Curtin (Brosna)

4 October 2025
17:00 IST (UTC+1)
First Round

Report

Austin Stacks	4–29 (41) – (17) 0–17	Milltown/Castlemaine
(HT: 3–23 - 0–02)
Gls: N Fitzmaurice, C Purcell, P Lane, J Murphy 1 each Pts: J Kissane 7 (3tp), P Lane 6 (1tp, 1tpf, 1f), D Kirby 5 (2tp), A Heinrich 3 (1tp), J O'Connor 2 (1tp), C Purcell 2 (1f), M Tansley 1 (1f), E O'Carroll, R Shanahan, B Murphy 1 each		Pts: É O'Connor 10 (3tpf, 4fs), D Hogan 3 (1tp, 1f), B Casey 2 (1f), G Horan 1

Austin Stack Park
Referee: E Moriarty (Dingle)

4 October 2025
19:00 IST (UTC+1)
First Round

Report

Dr Crokes	0–15 (15) – (17) 3–08	Mid Kerry
(HT: 0–04 - 1–06)
Pts: T Brosnan 9 (2tpf, 2tp, 1f), M Burns 1 (1f), D Shaw, B Courtney, T Doyle, C McMahon 1 each		Gls: E Clifford, J O'Connor, C Kennedy 1 each Pts: J O'Connor 2 (1tpf), D O'Connor 2 (1tp), C Kennedy 2, L Smith, K Evans 1 each

Austin Stack Park
Referee: S Mulvihill (St Senan's)

5 October 2025
13:30 IST (UTC+1)
First Round

Report

Dingle	2–19 (25) – (16) 1–13	Na Gaeil
(HT: 2–15 - 1–06)
Gls: T O'Sullivan, N Ryan 1 each Pts: P Geaney 5 (1tpf, 1f), N Geaney 4 (1tp), M Flaherty 3, T O'Sullivan, T de Brún 2 each, C Flannery, Brian O'Connor, C Bambury 1 each		Gls: R Ó hAiniféin 1 Pts: D Devine 7 (2tpf, 1f, 1tp), J Sheehan 2, J Barry, S Okunbor, S O'Connor, D Reen 1 each

Fitzgerald Stadium
Referee: E Walsh (Rathmore)

5 October 2025
14:00 IST (UTC+1)
First Round

Report

South Kerry	3–13 (22) – (27) 3–18	Spa
(HT: 3–07 - 1–07)
Gls: A Coffey, C O'Sullivan, S Teahan 1 each Pts: E Daly 4 (3fs),C Farley 3 (1tp), I O'Sullivan 3, Donagh O'Sullivan 2, S Teahan 1		Gls: M Foley, D Spillane, M Horgan 1 each Pts: C Tobin 9 (2tpf, 4fs), D Spillane 3, E Cronin 2, M Foley 1 (1f), L Spillane, G Vaughan, M Horgan 1 each

Glenbeigh
Referee: JM Fitzgerald (Abbeydorney)

5 October 2025
15:30 IST (UTC+1)
First Round

Report

Kenmare Shamrocks	4–15 (27) – (15) 1–12	North Kerry
(HT: 2–05 - 0–06)
Gls: J McCarthy, J Tangney 2 each Pts: S O'Shea 3 (1tp), T Cronin 3 (1tp), T Murnane 3, J McCarthy, D Crowley, J O'Sullivan, J Tangney, E McCarthy, T O'Sullivan 1 each		Gls: JJ Grimes 1 Pts: C Dillon 4 (1tpf, 1f), R Stack 2 (1tp), R O'Connell 2, E Healy, JJ Grimes, C Trant, D Mulvihill 1 each

Fitzgerald Stadium
Referee: P O'Sullivan (Firies)

Byes: Rathmore, West Kerry

=== Quarter-finals ===
11 October 2025
14:00 IST (UTC+1)
Quarter-final

Report

Rathmore	1–21 (24) – (9) 0–09	East Kerry
(HT: 1–06 - 0–07)
Gls: M Ryan 1 Pts: C Collins 6 (2fs), S Ryan 3 (1tpf), P Murphy 3 (1mk), C Ryan, P Moynihan 2 each, C Dineen, F Murphy, B Friel, M Reen, M Ryan		Pts: D Clifford 5 (1f, 1tp), P O'Shea 2 (2tp), R Murphy, Philip O'Leary 1 each

Fitzgerald Stadium
Referee: B Griffin (Clounmacon)

11 October 2025
16:00 IST (UTC+1)
Quarter-final

Report

Austin Stacks	1–19 (22) – (15) 0–15	Kenmare Shamrocks
(HT: 1–10 - 0–09)
Gls: C Purcell 1 Pts: P Lane 6 (2fs), J O'Connor 4, D Kirby 2 (1tp), B Murphy 2, M Tansley 1 (1'45), A Heinrich, C Horan, C Purcell, R Carroll 1 each		Pts: S O'Shea 7 (4fs, 1tpf, 1'45), J Tangney 2, T Murnane, P O'Connor, T Cronin, C O'Sullivan, D O'Connor, D O'Sullivan 1 each

Fitzgerald Stadium
Referee: S Joy (Laune Rangers)

12 October 2025
13:30 IST (UTC+1)
Quarter-final

Report

Spa	2–09 (15) – (31) 1–28	Mid Kerry
(HT: 2–02 - 1–16)
Gls: S Cronin, C Tobin 1 each Pts: E Cronin 3 (1tp), M Foley 2 (1tpf), C Tobin 1 (1f), G Vaughan, N McCarthy, D Spillane 1 each		Gls: D Cleary 1 Pts: C Kennedy 5 (2tp), S O'Brien 4 (1tp), L Carey 4 (1f), J O'Connor 3 (1f), D O'Connor, K Evans 3 each, D Cleary 2, M Breen, D Houlihan, C Teahan, S Gannon 1 each

Austin Stack Park
Referee: P Hayes (Kerins O'Rahilly's)

12 October 2025
15:30 IST (UTC+1)
Quarter-final

Report

West Kerry	0–13 (13) – (19) 1–16	Dingle
(HT: 0–06 - 1–09)
Pts: C Ó Gráda 4 (3fs), C Ó Beaglaoich 4 (2tp), R Ó Beaglaoich 3, C Ó Cinnéide, P Ó Sé 1 each		Gls: P Geaney 1 (1p); Pts: P Geaney 9 (3fs), N Ryan 2 (1tp), M Flaherty, D Geaney 2 each, T O'Sullivan 1

Austin Stack Park
Referee: B Brosnan (Glenflesk)

=== Semi-finals ===
18 October 2025
16:00 IST (UTC+1)
Semi-final

Report

Rathmore	1–09 (12) – (19) 1–16	Austin Stacks
(HT: 0–04 - 0–08)
Gls: J Moynihan 1 Pts: S Ryan 4 (1tpf, 1'45), C Collins 1 (1f), F Murphy, M Reen, M Ryan, J Moynihan 1 each		Gls: J O'Connor 1 Pts: P Lane 6 (1tp, 1f), J O'Connor 4 (1tp), A Heinrich 2 (1tp), J Kissane 2, B Murphy, R Carroll 1 each

Fitzgerald Stadium
Referee: B Griffin (Clounmacon)

19 October 2025
14:00 IST (UTC+1)
Semi-final

Report

Mid Kerry	0–16 (16) – (19) 1–16	Dingle
(HT: 0–08 - 1–06)
Pts: C Kennedy 7 (3fs, 1tp), S O'Brien 2 (1tp), K Evans 2, J O'Connor, D Houlihan 1 (1f) each, D O'Connor, D Cleary, L Carey 1 each		Gls: C Geaney 1 Pts: C Geaney 6 (2tpf), N Geaney 3 (1tp), Billy O'Connor, D Geaney 2 each, T O'Sullivan, Brian O'Connor, M Flaherty 1 each

Austin Stack Park
Referee: E Horan (Glenflesk)

=== Final ===
TG4

26 October 2025
13:45 WET (UTC)
Final

Report

Austin Stacks	1–12 (15) – (19) 2–13	Dingle
(HT: 0–08 - 0–04)
Gls: C Purcell 1 (p); Pts: P Lane 3 (1f), B Murphy 3, A Heinrich, J O'Connor 2 (1tp) each, G Horan 1 (f), J Kissane 1		Gls: P Geaney 2 Pts: C Geaney 4 (1tp, 1f), D Geaney 3 (1tp), T O'Sullivan, P Geaney 2 each, Brian O'Connor, T de Brún 1 each

Austin Stack Park
Referee: S Joy (Laune Rangers)

== Championship statistics ==
=== Miscellaneous ===
- This was the first meeting of Austin Stacks and Dingle in the final.
- Dingle win the title for the first time in 77 years.

== See also ==
- 2025 Kerry Club Football Championship
- 2025 Kerry Intermediate Football Championship
