= 2024 Kerry Senior Football Championship =

Gaelic football tournament season

2024 Kerry SFC
Tournament details
- County: Kerry
- Year: 2024
- Trophy: Bishop Moynihan Cup
- Sponsor: Garvey's Supervalu
- Date: 14 September – 27 October
- Teams: 16
- Defending champions: East Kerry

Winners
- Champions: Dr Crokes (14th win)
- Manager: Pat O'Shea
- Captain: David Naughten
- Qualify for: 2024 Munster Championship

Runners-up
- Runners-up: Dingle
- Manager: Pádraig Corcoran
- Captain: Paul Geaney

Other
- Website: https://www.kerrygaa.ie

The 2024 Kerry Senior Football Championship was the 123rd edition of Kerry GAA's premier tournament for senior Gaelic football teams in County Kerry, Ireland. The tournament consisted of 16 teams (8 senior club teams and 8 divisional teams). The defending Champions were East Kerry who retained their title by defeating Mid Kerry in the 2023 final for the second year in a row. Dr Crokes won the Championship for a record 14th time, defeating Dingle in the final in a repeat of the 2024 Kerry Club Football Championship final. Dr Crokes went on to represent Kerry in the 2024 Munster Senior Club Football Championship which they won, defeating Loughmore–Castleiney in the final.

== Format ==
The format for the 2024 Championship was different to the one used in recent years and reverted to a knock-out type competition. There was a double-elimination format for the first two rounds and then a single-elimination format was used for the rest of the championship. All sixteen teams played in Round 1 with the 8 winners advancing to Round 2A where the eight teams were drawn against each other with the four winners advancing to the quarter-finals. The 8 losers of Round 1 advanced to Round 2B where they were drawn to play against each other. The four winners advanced to Round 3 where they were drawn against the four losers from Round 2A. The four winners in Round 3 then advanced to the quarter-finals to play the Round 2A winners.

== Teams ==
Milltown/Castlemaine were promoted to the Kerry SFC for 2024 having won the 2023 Kerry Intermediate Football Championship. They replaced Kerins O'Rahilly's who in turn were relegated to the Intermediate Championship for 2024 having lost the 2023 Kerry Club Football Championship Relegation play-off to Na Gaeil.

=== General information ===
| Team | Location | Club/Division | Club's Divisional Side | Colours | In championship since | Championship Titles | Last Championship Title |
|---|---|---|---|---|---|---|---|
| Dingle | Dingle | Club | West Kerry | Red and white | 2005 | 6 | 1948 |
| Dr Crokes | Killarney | Club | East Kerry | Black and amber | 1986 | 13 | 2018 |
| East Kerry | East Kerry | Division | N/A | Red and white | 1925 | 11 | 2023 |
| Feale Rangers | North Kerry | Division | N/A | Gold and blue | 1956 | 3 | 2007 |
| Kenmare Shamrocks | Kenmare | Club | Kenmare District | Black and red | 2017 | 0 | — |
| Mid Kerry | Mid Kerry | Division | N/A | Green and red | 1947 | 4 | 2008 |
| Milltown/Castlemaine | Milltown | Club | Mid Kerry | Green and white | 2024 | 0 | — |
| Na Gaeil | Tralee | Club | St Brendan's | White and green | 2022 | 0 | — |
| Rathmore | Rathmore | Club | East Kerry | Red and white | 2023 | 0 | — |
| Shannon Rangers | North Kerry | Division | N/A | Blue and white | 1940 | 5 | 1977 |
| South Kerry | South Kerry | Division | N/A | Green and gold | 1925 | 10 | 2015 |
| Spa | Killarney | Club | East Kerry | Blue and gold | 2021 | 0 | — |
| St Brendan's | Tralee | Division | N/A | Green, black and white | | 0 | — |
| St Kieran's | Castleisland | Division | N/A | Green and white | 1988 | 1 | 1988 |
| Templenoe | Templenoe | Club | Kenmare District | Blue and white | 2020 | 0 | — |
| West Kerry | West Kerry | Division | N/A | Red and white | 1924 | 3 | 1990 |

== Rounds 1–3 ==
=== Round 1 ===
14 September 2024
16:00 IST (UTC+1)
Round 1

Report

| Kenmare Shamrocks | 2–07 (13) – (17) 1–14 | Dr Crokes |
|---|---|---|
(HT: 1–03 – 1–05)
| Gls: S O'Shea 2 Pts: S O'Shea 3 (2fs), D O'Connor, K O'Sullivan, S O'Brien, C O'Sullivan 1 each | | Gls: T Brosnan 1 (p); Pts: T Brosnan 6 (3fs, 1m), M Burns 3 (1f), E Looney 2, B Looney, C Keating, D Shaw 1 each |

Kenmare
Referee: P Hayes (Kerins O'Rahilly's)

14 September 2024
17:00 IST (UTC+1)
Round 1

Report

| Na Gaeil | 1–09 (12) – (16) 1–13 | Shannon Rangers |
|---|---|---|
(HT: 0–06 – 0–05)
| Gls: D Goggin; Pts: D Devine 4 (4fs), P Doyle 2, J Bourke 1 (f), D Goggin, D Reen 1 each | | Gls: K Goulding; Pts: J Kennelly 8 (5fs, 1m), R Stack 3 (1'45), J O'Sullivan, A Segal 1 each |

Austin Stack Park
Referee: E Horan (Glenflesk)

14 September 2024
19:00 IST (UTC+1)
Round 1

Report

| St Kieran's | 1–14 (17) – (11) 0–11 | West Kerry |
|---|---|---|
(HT: 1–07 – 0–07)
| Gls: P Walsh; Pts: P Walsh 6 (3fs), A Barry 3 (2fs), C McElligott 1 (m), B Leonard, P O'Connor, N Collins, C Brosnan 1 each | | Pts: C O'Grady 5 (5fs), T O'Donnell 2, J Crean 1 (f), K Falvey, M O'Connell 1 each |

Austin Stack Park
Referee: JM Fitzgerald (Abbeydorney)

15 September 2024
13:00 IST (UTC+1)
Round 1

Report

| Milltown/Castlemaine | 2–11 (17) – (16) 0–16 | Spa |
|---|---|---|
(HT: 1–02 – 0–09)
| Gls: G Horan 2 Pts: J O'Sullivan 3 (3fs), G McKenna, G Horan 2 each, P Wrenn, B Casey, C Moriarty, S Hogan 1 each | | Pts: C Tobin 4 (4fs), R Carroll, E Cronin 3 each, D O'Donoghue 2, M Horgan 1 (m), C Spillane, O O'Neill, D Spillane 1 each |

Fitzgerald Stadium
Referee: É Moran (Ballydonoghue)

15 September 2024
14:00 IST (UTC+1)
Round 1

Report

| Templenoe | 0–11 (11) – (10) 0–10 | Feale Rangers |
|---|---|---|
(HT: 0–03 – 0–06)
| Pts: K Spillane 8 (5fs), A Crowley 1 ('45), G Crowley, C Crowley 1 each | | Pts: C Dillon 8 (5fs, 2ms), J McElligott, C Mulvihill 1 each |

Templenoe
Referee: E Walsh (Rathmore)

15 September 2024
15:00 IST (UTC+1)
Round 1

Report

| Rathmore | 2–12 (18) – (28) 4–16 | East Kerry |
|---|---|---|
(HT: 0–09 – 1–08)
| Gls: C Collins, S Ryan 1 each Pts: S Ryan 5 (4fs), M Reen, J Moynihan 2 each, F Holohan, B O'Keeffe, C Collins 1 each | | Gls: L Crowley, D Clifford, E O'Shea, P Clifford 1 each Pts: D Clifford 7 (1f), L Crowley, P Clifford 3 each, R Buckley, D O'Sullivan, E O'Shea 1 each |

Fitzgerald Stadium
Referee: S Mulvihill (St Senan's)

15 September 2024
15:00 IST (UTC+1)
Round 1

Report

| St Brendan's | 1–16 (19) – (13) 0–13 | South Kerry |
|---|---|---|
(HT: 0–05 – 0–05)
| Gls: J Savage; Pts: J Savage 7 (5fs), C Holden 3, BJ Keane 2, D Moran, T Kennedy, D Kirby, O Ferris 1 each | | Pts: S Teahan 6 (2fs, 1m), E Daly 3 (2fs), C O'Sullivan 2, G O'Sullivan, C O'Shea 1 each |

Austin Stack Park
Referee: E Moriarty (Dingle)

15 September 2024
17:00 IST (UTC+1)
Round 1

Report

| Mid Kerry | 2–13 (19) – (16) 3–07 | Dingle |
|---|---|---|
(HT: 1–08 – 3–02)
| Gls: E Hassett, C Kennedy 1 each Pts: K Evans 5, E Hassett 2 (2fs), D Houlihan 2, M Breen, S O'Brien, L Smith, D O'Connor 1 each | | Gls: D Geaney 2, T O'Sullivan 1 Pts: P Geaney, C Geaney 2 (1f) each, C Flannery, M O'Flaherty, B O'Connor 1 each |

Austin Stack Park
Referee: P O'Sullivan (Firies)

=== Round 2A ===
21 September 2024
19:00 IST (UTC+1)
Round 2A

Report

| St Kieran's | 2–13 (19) – (20) 2–14 | St Brendan's |
|---|---|---|
(HT: 1–07 – 1–08)
| Gls: T Brick, C Brosnan 1 each Pts: A Barry 5 (4fs), P Walsh 5 (3fs), C Brosnan 2 (1m), S O'Connell 1 | | Gls: J Savage 1 (p), BJ Keane 1 Pts: J Savage 6 (1m, 5fs), T Kennedy 3, C Bennett, A Heinrich, J O'Connor, T Hoare, BJ Keane 1 each |

Austin Stack Park
Referee: É Moran (Ballydonoghue)

22 September 2024
14:00 IST (UTC+1)
Round 2A

Report

| East Kerry | 0–16 (16) – (6) 0–06 | Milltown/Castlemaine |
|---|---|---|
(HT: 0–10 – 0–03)
| Pts: P Clifford 7 (2fs, 1'45), D Clifford 4 (2fs), E O'Shea 1 (f), C Gammell, D Lyne, L Crowley, D Murphy 1 each | | Pts: J O'Sullivan 2 (2ms), C Spillane 2, G McKenna, J Flynn 1 each |

Austin Stack Park
Referee: P Hayes (Kerins O'Rahilly's)

22 September 2024
15:00 IST (UTC+1)
Round 2A

Report

| Shannon Rangers | 1–12 (15) – (19) 1–16 (a.e.t.) | Templenoe |
|---|---|---|
(HT: 0–04 – 0–06) (FT: 1–10 – 1–10)
| Gls: K Goulding 1 Pts: J Kennelly 7 (3fs, 1m), J Foley, E Boyle, D Keane, J Coolahan, B O'Neill 1 each | | Gls: T Morley 1 Pts: K Spillane 5 (2fs, 1 m), B Crowley 4, K McCarthy, A Spillane 2 each, J Rice, G Crowley, C Crowley 1 each |

Fitzgerald Stadium
Referee: B Brosnan (Glenflesk)

22 September 2024
16:00 IST (UTC+1)
Round 2A

Report

| Mid Kerry | 1–08 (11) – (19) 1–16 | Dr Crokes |
|---|---|---|
(HT: 1–04 – 1–10)
| Gls: C Kennedy 1 Pts: E Hassett 6 (3fs), S O'Brien 1 (m), K Evans 1 | | Gls: T Brosnan 1 Pts: T Brosnan 7 (3fs, 1m), D Shaw 4 (1m), M Burns 3 (1f), T Doyle, D Casey 1 each |

Austin Stack Park
Referee: B Griffin (Clounmacon)

=== Round 2B ===
21 September 2024
16:00 IST (UTC+1)
Round 2B

Report

| Spa | 4–08 (20) – (16) 2–10 | Na Gaeil |
|---|---|---|
(HT: 2–04 – 0–03)
| Gls: C Tobin 2, M Foley, D Spillane 1 each Pts: E Cronin 3 (1f), M Foley 2 (1f), C Tobin 2, D Spillane 1 | | Gls: S Okunbor, D Goggin 1 each Pts: D Goggin 3, D O'Connor 2, D Reen, N O'Mahony, D Devine 1 (1f) each, T Hanafin, J O'Connor 1 each |

Milltown
Referee: S Mulvihill (St Senan's)

21 September 2024
17:00 IST (UTC+1)
Round 2B

Report

| Rathmore | 1–16 (19) – (14) 1–11 | West Kerry |
|---|---|---|
(HT: 1–09 – 0–04)
| Gls: J Moynihan 1 Pts: S Ryan 5 (1'45, 1m, 1f), J Darmody 3 (3fs), P Moynihan 2 (1m), C Collins 2, C Dineen, C Ryan, B O'Keeffe, J Moynihan 1 each | | Gls: C Corduff 1 Pts: C O'Grady 5 (2fs), C Kennedy 2, K Falvey, C Ferriter, R Begley, C Corduff 1 each |

Austin Stack Park
Referee: P Curtin (Brosna)

22 September 2024
13:00 IST (UTC+1)
Round 2B

Report

| Feale Rangers | 1–13 (16) – (29) 3–20 | Kenmare Shamrocks |
|---|---|---|
(HT: 0–05 – 1–12)
| Gls: T Dillon 1 Pts: C Dillon 4 (3fs), J McElligott, C Kennelly 2 each, D Lynch 1 (m), P Walsh, C Trant, T Moloney, D Keane 1 each | | Gls: S O'Shea, D Hallissey, S O'Brien 1 each Pts: S O'Shea 10 (2 fs, 1'45), T Murnane 3 (1m), J Lehane, S O'Brien 2 each, T Cronin, P O'Connor, T O'Sullivan 1 each |

Fitzgerald Stadium
Referee: P O'Sullivan (Firies)

22 September 2024
13:30 IST (UTC+1)
Round 2B

Report

| South Kerry | 0–07 (7) – (13) 0–13 | Dingle |
|---|---|---|
(HT: 0–04 – 0–06)
| Pts: S Teahan, E Daly 2 (2fs) each, F O'Sullivan 2, C O'Sullivan 1 | | Pts: P Geaney 6 (5fs), D Geaney 3 (1f), B O'Sullivan 2, M Flaherty, T Brown 1 each |

Killorglin
Referee: JM Fitzgerald (Abbeydorney)

=== Round 3 ===
28 September 2024
15:00 IST (UTC+1)
Round 3

Report

| St Kieran's | 1–12 (15) – (12) 1–09 | Spa |
|---|---|---|
(HT: 1–06 – 1–05)
| Gls: A Barry 1 (p); Pts: P O'Connor 4, M Reidy 2, T Brick, C McElligott, P Walsh, A Barry, C Brosnan, J McMahon 1 each | | Gls: D Spillane 1 Pts: E Cronin 4, C Tobin 3 (2fs), D Spillane, L O'Neill 1 each |

Milltown
Referee: E Moriarty (Dingle)

28 September 2024
16:00 IST (UTC+1)
Round 3

Report

| Shannon Rangers | 1–14 (17) – (22) 3–13 | Rathmore |
|---|---|---|
(HT: 0–05 – 1–08)
| Gls: L Guiney 1 Pts: J Kennelly 5 (4fs), L Rochford 3, A Segal 2 (1f), R Stack 2, D Mulvihill, E Boyle 1 each | | Gls: P Moynihan, C Collins, J Moynihan 1 each Pts: S Ryan 4 (2fs), J Darmody 3 (1f), F Murphy 2, D Rahilly, P Murphy, J Moynihan, D Nagle 1 each |

Castleisland
Referee: P Hayes (Kerins O'Rahilly's)

29 September 2024
14:00 IST (UTC+1)
Round 3

Report

| Milltown/Castlemaine | 0–01 (1) – (18) 0–18 | Dingle |
|---|---|---|
(HT: 0–01 – 0–09)
| Pts: É O'Connor 1 (f) | | Pts: P Geaney 8 (5fs, 1m), D Geaney 3 (1f, 1m), T O'Sullivan, M Flaherty 2 each, B O'Sullivan, N Geaney, C Bambury 1 each |

Strand Road
Referee: E Walsh (Rathmore)

29 September 2024
15:00 IST (UTC+1)
Round 3

Report

| Mid Kerry | 1–11 (14) – (15) 2–09 | Kenmare Shamrocks |
|---|---|---|
(HT: 1–06 – 0–05)
| Gls: C Kennedy 1 Pts: E Hassett 5 (5fs), C Kennedy 3, S Cleary, M Breen, R Murphy 1 each | | Gls: P O'Connor 1 (p), D O'Shea 1 Pts: S O'Shea 5 (3fs), K O'Sullivan 2, T Cronin, J O'Sullivan 1 each |

Lewis Road
Referee: B Brosnan (Glenflesk)

== Knockout stage ==
=== Bracket ===
Quarter-finals; 6 October
Dr Crokes | 1–17
Rathmore | 2–09
St Brendan's | 0–16
Kenmare Shamrocks | 0–14
Templenoe | 0–09
Dingle | 1–16
East Kerry | 1–14
St Kieran’s | 1–12

Semi-finals; 12 October
Dr Crokes | 0–14
St Brendan's | 0–09
Dingle | 2–16
East Kerry | 1–14

Final; 27 October
Dr Crokes | 3–08
Dingle | 0–11

=== Quarter-finals ===
6 October 2024
13:30 IST (UTC+1)
Quarter-final 1

Report

| Templenoe | 0–09 (9) – (19) 1–16 | Dingle |
|---|---|---|
(HT: 0–07 – 0–08)
| Pts: K Spillane 6 (4fs), J Rice 2, M Casey 1 | | Gls: P Geaney 1 Pts: P Geaney 7 (5fs), N Geaney, D Geaney 2 each, T O'Sullivan, B O'Sullivan, M Flaherty, T Brown, C Bambury 1 each |

Fitzgerald Stadium
Referee: É Moran (Ballydonoghue)

6 October 2024
14:00 IST (UTC+1)
Quarter-final 2

Report

| East Kerry | 1–14 (17) – (15) 1–12 | St Kieran's |
|---|---|---|
(HT: 1–06 – 1–06)
| Gls: P O'Leary 1 Pts: D Clifford 6 (3fs), F Murphy 5 (3fs), C Lynch, R Murphy, P Clifford 1 each | | Gls: B Leonard 1 Pts: P Walsh 5 (2fs), P O'Connor 2, A Barry 1 (f), E Horan 1 (m), S O'Connell, C Brosnan, N Collins 1 each |

Austin Stack Park
Referee: E Moriarty (Dingle)

6 October 2024
14:00 IST (UTC+1)
Quarter-final 3

Report

| St Brendan's | 0–16 (16) – (14) 0–14 | Kenmare Shamrocks |
|---|---|---|
(HT: 0–11 – 0–06)
| Pts: J Savage 5 (3fs), BJ Keane 4, P Lane 2, J O'Connor, D Griffin, A Heinrich, D Casey, D Moran 1 each | | Pts: S O'Shea 10 (5fs, 1'45), J McCarthy 2, D Hallissey, S O'Brien 1 each |

Beaufort
Referee: B Griffin (Clounmacon)

6 October 2024
15:30 IST (UTC+1)
Quarter-final 4

Report

| Dr Crokes | 1–17 (20) – (15) 2–09 | Rathmore |
|---|---|---|
(HT: 1–08 – 1–02)
| Gls: T Brosnan 1 (p); Pts: T Brosnan 5 (2fs), E Looney, M Burns, D Shaw, A Hennigan 2 each, B Looney, G O'Shea, C McMahon, K O'Leary 1 each | | Gls: C Collins, D Nagle 1 each Pts: S Ryan 3 (1f), C Ryan 2, P Moynihan, P Murphy, C Collins, D Nagle 1 each |

Fitzgerald Stadium
Referee: P O'Sullivan (Firies)

=== Semi-finals ===
12 October 2024
17:00 IST (UTC+1)
Semi-final 1

Report

| Dr Crokes | 0–14 (14) – (9) 0–09 | St Brendan's |
|---|---|---|
(HT: 0–08 – 0–05)
| Pts: T Brosnan 5 (5fs), B Looney, M Burns, D Shaw 2 each, G O'Shea, T Doyle, K O'Leary 1 each | | Pts: J Savage 3 (2fs, 1m), T Kennedy 2, D Griffin, J O'Connor, D Kirby, P Lane 1 each |

Austin Stack Park
Referee: S Mulvihill (St Senan's)

13 October 2024
14:00 IST (UTC+1)
Semi-final 2

Report

| Dingle | 2–16 (22) – (17) 1–14 (a.e.t.) | East Kerry |
|---|---|---|
(HT: 1–03 – 0–05) (FT: 2–09 – 1–12)
| Gls: TL O'Sullivan, P Geaney 1 each Pts: D Geaney 6 (1f), P Geaney 4 (1f,1m), C Geaney 3 (2fs), M Flaherty 2, T O'Sullivan 1 | | Gls: D Clifford 1 Pts: D O'Sullivan 6 (3fs, 1m), D Clifford 2 (2fs), N Donohue, P O'Leary, R Buckley, L Crowley, R Murphy, P Clifford 1 each |

Austin Stack Park
Referee: B Griffin (Clounmacon)

=== Final ===
27 October 2024
14:30 WET (UTC+0)
Final

Report

| Dr Crokes | 3–08 (17) – (11) 0–11 | Dingle |
|---|---|---|
(HT: 0–04 – 0–06)
| Gls: D Shaw, K O'Leary, E Looney 1 each Pts: M Burns 4 (1f), G White 2, D Shaw, K O'Leary 1 each | | Pts: D Geaney 5, P Geaney 2 (1f), T O'Sullivan, B O'Sullivan, C Bambury, C Geaney 1 each |

Austin Stack Park
Referee: B Griffin (Clounmacon)

== See also ==
- 2024 Kerry Club Football Championship
- 2024 Kerry Intermediate Football Championship
