= 2024 Kerry Club Football Championship =

Gaelic football tournament season

Tournament details
- County: Kerry
- Year: 2024
- Trophy: Michael O'Connor Cup
- Sponsor: Kerry Petroleum
- Date: 27 July – 1 September
- Teams: 8
- Defending champions: Dingle

Winners
- Champions: Dr Crokes (9th win)
- Manager: Pat O'Shea
- Captain: David Naughten

Runners-up
- Runners-up: Dingle
- Manager: Pádraig Corcoran
- Captain: Paul Geaney

Other
- Website: http://www.kerrygaa.ie/

The 2024 Kerry Club Football Championship (known as the Kerry Petroleum Senior Club Football Championship for sponsorship reasons) was the 2024 edition of the Kerry Club Football Championship. The tournament consisted of Kerry GAA's 8 senior club teams. The Championship was won by Dr Crokes who defeated reigning champions Dingle in the final.

== Format ==
The championship had a similar format to that used in 2023. The draw took place at Austin Stack Park, Tralee on 15 February 2024. The 8 clubs were drawn into two groups of 4 teams each with each team to play the other three in their group once, having one home match, one away match and one at a neutral venue. The top two teams from each group advanced to the semi-finals with each group winner playing the runner-up of the other group at home. The semi-final winners played each other in the final.

In a change from 2023 there was no relegation to the Intermediate Championship in 2024. This was to facilitate changes to the Senior Championships which are to commence in 2025.

== Teams ==
=== Team changes ===
Promoted from the Kerry Intermediate Football Championship

- Milltown/Castlemaine

Relegated to the Kerry Intermediate Football Championship

- Kerins O'Rahilly's

=== Teams ===
Team	Location	Club's Divisional Side	Championship Titles	Last Championship Title
Dingle	Dingle	West Kerry	2	2023
Dr Crokes	Killarney	East Kerry	6	2018
Kenmare Shamrocks	Kenmare	Kenmare District	1	1983
Milltown/Castlemaine	Milltown	Mid Kerry	1	2004
Na Gaeil	Tralee	St Brendan's	0	—
Rathmore	Rathmore	East Kerry	1	2011
Spa	Killarney	East Kerry	0	—
Templenoe	Templenoe	Kenmare District	0	—

== Group Stage ==
=== Group A ===
Pos	Team	Pld	W	D	L	Diff	Pts	Qualification
1	Rathmore	3	2	0	1	-8	4	Advance to Semi-finals
2	Kenmare Shamrocks	3	1	1	1	+5	3	Advance to Semi-finals
3	Spa	3	1	1	1	+4	3	
4	Templenoe	3	0	2	1	-1	2	

Round 1

27 July 2024 Round 1	Spa	1–14 (17) – (17) 2–11	Templenoe	Glenflesk
18:30 IST (UTC+1)		(HT: 1–08 – 1–03)
	Gls: E Cronin 1 Pts: E Cronin 8 (4fs), D Spillane 3 (1m), M Foley 1 (1f), D Moynihan 1 (1m), M Kearney 1	Report	Gls: J Crowley Holland, A Spillane 1 each Pts: K Spillane 6 (3fs), J Rice, T Morley, S Sheahan, B Crowley, A Crowley 1 each	Referee: B Griffin (Clounmacon)

27 July 2024 Round 1	Rathmore	3–11 (20) – (16) 0–16	Kenmare Shamrocks	Fitzgerald Stadium
19:00 IST (UTC+1)		(HT: 0–10 – 0–05)
	Gls: J Moynihan 2 (1p), C Collins 1 Pts: F Murphy 3 (1f), J Darmody 3 (3fs), C Collins 2, S Ryan 1 (1m), B O'Keeffe, C Spiers 1 each	Report	Pts: S O'Shea 11 (7fs), S O'Brien 2, J McCarthy, K O'Sullivan, J Lehane 1 each	Referee: E Moran (Ballydonoghue)

Round 2

2 August 2024 Round 2	Spa	0–11 (11) – (20) 2–14	Kenmare Shamrocks	Tullig
19:15 IST (UTC+1)		(HT: 0–05 – 0–04)
	Pts: E Cronin (4), M Foley 3 (2fs), C Stack, S Cronin, M Kearney, M Moynihan 1 each	Report	Gls: S O'Sullivan, S O'Brien 1 each Pts: S O'Shea 5 (4fs), J Tagney, J O'Sullivan 2 each, D O'Connor, S O'Sullivan, J Lehane, P O'Connor, D Allman 1 each	Referee: B Brosnan (Glenflesk)

4 August 2024 Round 2	Templenoe	1–11 (14) – (15) 2–09	Rathmore	Templenoe
13:00 IST (UTC+1)		(HT: 1–06 – 2–04)
	Gls: J Crowley Holland 1 Pts: K Spillane 8 (6fs), A Crowley 2 (1'45), A Spillane 1		Gls: J Moynihan, A Moynihan 1 each Pts: S Ryan 4 (3fs), J Darmody 2 (1f), C Ryan, F Murphy, C Collins 1 each	Referee: P Curtin (Brosna)

Round 3

11 August 2024 Round 3	Kenmare Shamrocks	0–13 (13) – (13) 0–13	Templenoe	Kenmare
16:00 IST (UTC+1)		(HT: 0–05 – 0–05)
	Pts: S O'Shea 5 (2fs, 2ms), K O'Sullivan, T Murnane 2 each, D O'Shea, D Hallissey, T O'Sullivan, D Ciuciu 1 each	Report	Pts: K Spillane 7 (4fs), A Crowley 1 ('45), J Rice, G Crowley, C Crowley, B Crowley, P Clifford 1 each	Referee: P O'Sullivan (Firies)

11 August 2024 Round 3	Rathmore	2–06 (12) – (25) 5–10	Spa	Rathmore
16:00 IST (UTC+1)		(HT: 1–04 – 2–03)
	Gls: S Ryan 1 (p), J Moynihan 1 Pts: S Ryan 4 (2fs), C Spiers 2	Report	Gls: D Spillane 3 (1p), C Stack, E Fitzgerald 1 each Pts: E Cronin, M Foley 3 (1f) each, D Spillane, D O'Donoghue, S Cronin, M Kearney 1 each	Referee: S O'Shea (Keel)

=== Group B ===
Pos	Team	Pld	W	D	L	Diff	Pts	Qualification
1	Dingle	3	3	0	0	+32	6	Advance to Semi-finals
2	Dr Crokes	3	2	0	1	+9	4	Advance to Semi-finals
3	Milltown/Castlemaine	3	1	0	2	-22	2	
4	Na Gaeil	3	0	0	3	-19	0	

Round 1

27 July 2024 Round 1	Milltown/Castlemaine	0–16 (16) – (15) 0–15	Na Gaeil	Austin Stack Park
17:00 IST (UTC+1)		(HT: 0–10 – 0–08)
	Pts: E O'Connor 6 (5fs), C Moriarty 4, G Horan, J O'Sullivan 2 each, D Roche, D Hogan 1 each	Report	Pts: J Bourke 5 (2m), D Devine 5 (3fs), O O'Brien, J Doyle, D O'Connor, K O'Connor, D Goggin 1 each	Referee: E Horan (Glenflesk)

27 July 2024 Round 1	Dingle	3–17 (26) – (20) 2–14	Dr Crokes	Austin Stack Park
19:00 IST (UTC+1)		(HT: 1–09 – 1–05)
	Gls: P Geaney 2 (1p), D Geaney 1 Pts: P Geaney 7 (3fs), C Geaney 3 (1f), T O'Sullivan 2, D Geaney 1 (1m), M Flaherty, B O'Sullivan, C Bambury, L de Brun 1 each	Report	Gls: M Fitzgerald, K O'Leary 1 each Pts: D Shaw 5 (2fs, 1m), T Brosnan 4 (3fs), C McMahon 3, E Looney, C Keating 1 each	Referee: S Mulvihill (St Senan's)

Round 2

3 August 2024 Round 2	Dingle	1–17 (20) – (6) 0–06	Na Gaeil	Dingle
19:00 IST (UTC+1)

3 August 2024 Round 2	Dr Crokes	0–17 (17) – (6) 0–06	Milltown/Castlemaine	Lewis Rd
19:00 IST (UTC+1)		(HT: 0–06 – 0–05)
	Pts: T Brosnan 6 (4fs), D Casey 2 (2fs), D Shaw, C McMahon 2 each, F Fitzgerald, M O'Shea, M Potts, T Doyle, A Hennigan 1 each	Report	Pts: E O'Connor 4 (3fs, 1'45), C Moriarty, D Hogan 1 each	Referee: P Hayes (Kerins O'Rahilly's)

Round 3

10 August 2024 Round 3	Milltown/Castlemaine	0–05 (5) – (17) 1–14	Dingle	Milltown
16:00 IST (UTC+1)		(HT: 0–04 – 0–06)
	Pts: É O'Connor 3 (1f, 1'45), J O'Sullivan, C Moriarty 1 each	Report	Gls: C Bambury 1 Pts: P Geaney 6 (5fs), B O'Sullivan, D Geaney 2 each, C Geaney 1 (f), C Flannery, T O'Sullivan, L O'Sullivan 1 each	Referee: JM Fitzgerald (Abbeydorney)

10 August 2024 Round 3	Na Gaeil	0–08 (8) – (12) 1–09	Dr Crokes	Killeen
16:00 IST (UTC+1)		(HT: 0–06 – 0–06)
	Pts: D O'Connor, T Hanafin 3 each, J Doyle, C O'Donovan 1 each	Report	Gls: C McMahon 1 Pts: T Brosnan 4 (3fs), D Casey 1 (f), G White, E Looney, M Casey, C McMahon 1 each	Referee: D Clifford (Laune Rangers)

== Knockout stage ==
=== Bracket ===
Semi-Finals
Dingle	3-12
Kenmare Shamrocks	3-11
Rathmore	2–10
Dr Crokes	1–15

Final
Dingle	0–11
Dr Crokes	1–15

=== Semi-finals ===
17 August 2024
18:00 IST (UTC+1)
Semi-final 1

Report

Dingle	3–12 (21) – (20) 3–11	Kenmare Shamrocks
(HT: 0–08 – 0–06)
Gls: D O'Sullivan, D Geaney, C Bambury 1 each Pts: C Geaney 4 (1m), P Geaney 3 (1f), D Geaney, C Bambury 2 each, B O'Connor 1		Gls: D O'Connor, S O'Brien, P O'Connor 1 each Pts: S O'Shea 7 (5fs), T Murnane 2, D O'Connor, P O'Connor 1 each

Dingle
Referee: B Griffin (Clounmacon)

18 August 2024
16:00 IST (UTC+1)
Semi-final 2

Report

Rathmore	2–10 (16) – (18) 1–15	Dr Crokes
(HT: 0–03 – 1–09)
Gls: A Moynihan, F Murphy 1 each Pts: S Ryan 4 (3fs, 1'45), C Dineen, C Collins, F Murphy, J Moynihan, A Dineen, C Spiers 1 each		Gls: T Brosnan 1 Pts: T Brosnan 5 (1f), M Burns 3 (1f), C McMahon 3, T Doyle, D Shaw 2 each

Rathmore
Referee: P Hayes (Kerins O'Rahilly's)

=== Final ===
TG4

1 September 2024
14:00 IST (UTC+1)
Final

Report

Dr Crokes	1–15 (18) – (11) 0–11	Dingle
(HT: 1–07 – 0–05)
Gls: C McMahon; Pts: T Brosnan 9 (5fs), M Burns 4 (1f), E Looney, C McMahon 1 each		Pts: D Geaney 5, P Geaney 3 (1f), C Geaney 2, M Geaney 1

Austin Stack Park
Referee: Séamus Mulvihill (St Senan's)

== See also ==
- 2024 Kerry Senior Football Championship
- 2024 Kerry Intermediate Football Championship
