= Kerry Club Football Championship =

Gaelic football competition

Kerry Petroleum Senior Club Football Championship
- Current season or competition: 2026 Kerry Club Football Championship
- Irish: Craobh Sinsear Club Chontae Chiarraí
- Trophy: Michael O'Connor Cup
- Title holders: Rathmore
- Most titles: Dr Crokes (10 titles)
- Sponsors: Kerry Petroleum

The Kerry Club Football Championship is a Gaelic football championship played between senior clubs in County Kerry, in the south-west of Ireland.

In the event of the Kerry Senior Football Championship being won by a divisional team, the winner of this competition represents Kerry in the Munster Senior Club Football Championship (as divisional teams cannot play in the provincial competition).

The competition was not played in 2006, 2007 and 2008.

== Format ==
The Championship has seen an increase in the number of teams participating from 8 in 2024 to 10 in 2026. The teams play in three groups with each team playing the others once. The top two teams in each group advance to the knock-out stage, with 2 teams going straight to the semi-finals and the others playing in 2 quarter-finals. Teams who don't make the knock-out stage compete in the relegation play-offs, with the loser dropping down to the Intermediate Championship. However, if any team that plays in the relegation play-off final reach the final of the Senior Football Championship, they will not be relegated.

== Teams ==
=== 2026 Teams ===
Team	Location	Division	Colours	In championship since	Championship Titles	Last Championship Title
An Ghaeltacht	Gallarus	West Kerry	White and red	2026	3	2005
Austin Stacks	Tralee	St Brendan's	Black and amber	2025	6	2021
Dingle	Dingle	West Kerry	Red and white	2005	2	2023
Dr Crokes	Killarney	East Kerry	Black and amber	1986	9	2024
Kenmare Shamrocks	Kenmare	Kenmare District	Black and red	2017	1	1983
Milltown/Castlemaine	Milltown	Mid Kerry	Green and white	2024	1	2004
Na Gaeil	Tralee	St Brendan's	White and green	2022	0	—
Rathmore	Rathmore	East Kerry	Red and white	2023	1	2011
Spa	Killarney	East Kerry	Blue and gold	2021	0	—
Templenoe	Templenoe	Kenmare District	Blue and white	2020	0	—

== List of finals ==
=== Legend ===
- Beige – Also Kerry Senior Football Championship winners

=== List of finals ===
Year	Winners		Runners-up	
Year	Club	Score	Club	Score
2026	Rathmore	2–10	Dr Crokes	0–12
2025	Dr Crokes	0–20	Na Gaeil	1–12
2024	Dr. Crokes	1–15	Dingle	0–11
2023	Dingle	1–09	Kenmare Shamrocks	0–11
2022	Kerins O'Rahilly's	0–15	Templenoe	0–14
2021	Austin Stacks	1–16	Kenmare Shamrocks	1–11
2020	Austin Stacks	1–17	Kenmare Shamrocks	1–14
2019	Austin Stacks	1–21	Dr. Crokes	1–15
2018	Dr. Crokes	1–18	Dingle	1–08
2017	Dr. Crokes	3–20	Kenmare Shamrocks	2–20
2016	Austin Stacks	2–12	Dr. Crokes	1–14
2015	Dingle	2–12	Dr. Crokes	0–14
2014	Dr. Crokes	4–13	Killarney Legion	1–09
2013	Dr. Crokes	3–15	Killarney Legion	1–08
2012	Dr. Crokes	0–14	Rathmore	0–06
2011	Rathmore	0–12	Laune Rangers	0–10
2010	Kerins O'Rahilly's	1–14	Rathmore	1–10
2009	Kerins O'Rahilly's	2–12	Ardfert	1–06
2006-08	No championship			
2005	An Ghaeltacht	2–08	Kerins O'Rahilly's	0–06
2004	Milltown/Castlemaine	1–08	Laune Rangers	1–04
2003	Austin Stacks	1–09	An Ghaeltacht	0–11
2002	An Ghaeltacht	1–15	Laune Rangers	0–07
2001	An Ghaeltacht	0–11	Rathmore	1–06
2000	Glenflesk	1–08	An Ghaeltacht	0–10
1999	Laune Rangers	2–12	An Ghaeltacht	1–07
1998	Laune Rangers	0–11	Kerins O'Rahilly's	0–10
1997				
1996	Dr. Crokes			
1995	Castleisland Desmonds			
1994	Killarney Legion		Waterville	
1993	Castleisland Desmonds			
1992	Dr. Crokes			
1991	Castleisland Desmonds		Annascaul	
1990	Dr. Crokes		Castleisland Desmonds	
1989	Annascaul		St. Senan's	
1988	Castleisland Desmonds		Valentia Young Islanders	
1987	Castleisland Desmonds			
1986	Valentia Young Islanders			
1985	Castleisland Desmonds			
1984	Castleisland Desmonds			
1983	Kenmare Shamrocks	1–09	Ardfert	1–04
1982	Castleisland Desmonds			
1981	Castleisland Desmonds			
1980	Gneeveguilla			
1979	Austin Stacks			
1978				
1977				
1976				
1975				
1974				

== Roll of honour ==
#	Team	Titles	Runners-Up	Winning years	Losing years
1	Dr. Crokes	10	4	1990, 1992, 1996, 2012, 2013, 2014, 2017, 2018, 2024, 2025	2015, 2016, 2019, 2026
2	Castleisland Desmonds	9	1	1981, 1982, 1984, 1985, 1987, 1988, 1991, 1993, 1995	1990
3	Austin Stacks	6	0	1979, 2003, 2016, 2019, 2020, 2021	—
4	An Ghaeltacht	3	3	2001, 2002, 2005	1999, 2000, 2003
4	Kerins O'Rahilly's	3	2	2009, 2010, 2022	1998, 2005
6	Laune Rangers	2	3	1998, 1999	2002, 2004, 2011
6	Rathmore	2	3	2011, 2026	2001, 2010, 2012
6	Dingle	2	2	2015, 2023	2018, 2024
9	Kenmare Shamrocks	1	4	1983	2017, 2020, 2021, 2023
9	Killarney Legion	1	2	1994	2013, 2014
9	Valentia	1	1	1986	1988
9	Annascaul	1	1	1989	1991
9	Gneeveguilla	1	0	1980	—
9	Glenflesk	1	0	2000	—
9	Milltown/Castlemaine	1	0	2004	—
16	Ardfert	0	2	—	1983, 2009
16	St Senan's	0	1	—	1989
16	Waterville	0	1	—	1994
16	Templenoe	0	1	—	2022
16	Na Gaeil	0	1	—	2025

== See also ==
- Kerry Senior Football Championship
