= P. J. McIntyre =

Irish hurler and Gaelic footballer

Personal information
- Born: Kenmare, County Kerry, Ireland
- Occupation: Garda Síochána

Sport
- Football Position: Full-forward
- Hurling Position: Full-back
Clubs
- Years: Club
- Kenmare; Kilgarvan; Austin Stacks
Inter-county
Years	County	Apps (scores)
	Kerry (F); Kerry (H); Offaly (H)	1
Inter-county titles
	Football	Hurling
Munster Titles		0
All-Ireland Titles	0	0
League titles	0	0
All-Stars	0	0

P. J. McIntyre was a dual player from Kenmare, County Kerry. He played both football and hurling at inter-county and club level in Kerry during the 1960s and 1970s. He also played with Offaly and St Rynagh's.

He won a Munster JFC title, later adding an All-Ireland JFC, with Kerry in 1967, and a Munster IHC title in 1970.

His son Seamus followed in his father's footsteps in both sport and professional life by joining the Garda Síochána; he died in an accident in Cork City in 2001.
