= Ian Twiss =

Irish Gaelic footballer

Personal information
- Born: Milltown, County Kerry

Sport
- Sport: Gaelic football
- Position: Corner forward
Club
- Years: Club
- 1990s-2010s: Milltown/Castlemaine
Club titles
- Kerry titles: 1
Inter-county
Years	County	Apps (scores)
2002	Kerry	2 (0-02)
Inter-county titles
- Munster titles: 0
- All-Irelands: 0
- NFL: 0
- All Stars: 0

Ian Twiss (born Milltown, County Kerry) is a Gaelic footballer from County Kerry. He has played with Kerry at all levels. He first came on the scene in 1996 when he won a Munster Minor Championship he later played in the All Ireland final but Kerry lost out to Laois. He then moved on to the Under 21 team in 1998 where in won a Munster Championship and later an All Ireland. He was till underage in 1999 and won a second Munster medal and Kerry once again made it to the All Ireland final where they were shocked by Westmeath, Twiss missed a penalty. He played with the Kerry senior team for one year in 2002 and was part of the team that lost out to Armagh in that year's All Ireland final.

He has had a lot of success at club level with Milltown/Castlemaine. In 2001 he helped the club to win the Division 1 County League title, the first in the club's history. He has won two Intermediate Championships with the club in 2003 and 2011, as well as a Club Championship in 2004. He has also won Mid Kerry Championships in 2001, 2007, 2008 and 2010. In 2011 he also won a Munster Intermediate Club Championship and in 2012 an All Ireland title.
