= 2023 Kerry Club Football Championship =

Gaelic football tournament season

Tournament details
- County: Kerry
- Year: 2023
- Trophy: Michael O'Connor Cup
- Sponsor: Kerry Petroleum
- Date: 12 August – 28 October
- Teams: 8
- Defending champions: Kerins O'Rahilly's

Winners
- Champions: Dingle (2nd win)
- Manager: Pádraig Corcoran
- Captain: Paul Geaney
- Qualify for: 2023 Munster Senior Club Football Championship

Runners-up
- Runners-up: Kenmare Shamrocks
- Manager: Kieran Moriarty
- Captain: Kieran Fitzgibbon

Promotion/Relegation
- Promoted team(s): Milltown/Castlemaine
- Relegated team(s): Kerins O'Rahilly's

Other
- Website: http://www.kerrygaa.ie/

The 2023 Kerry Club Football Championship was the 2023 instalment of the Kerry Club Football Championship. The tournament consisted of 8 teams. The final, in which Dingle defeated Kenmare Shamrocks, was held on 9 September 2023.

== Format ==
The 8 clubs were drawn into two groups of 4 teams each with each team playing the other three in their group once, having one home match, one away match and one at a neutral venue. The top two teams from each group advanced to the semi-finals with each group winner playing the runner-up in the other group at home. The semi-final winners then played each other in the final.
The teams that finished in last place in each group played against each other in the relegation play-off with the winner retaining their senior status for 2024, while the loser was relegated to the Kerry Intermediate Football Championship for 2024.

== Teams ==
=== Team changes ===
Promoted from the Kerry Intermediate Football Championship

- Rathmore

Relegated to the Kerry Intermediate Football Championship

- Austin Stacks

=== Teams ===
Team	Location	Club's Divisional Side	Championship Titles	Last Championship Title
Dingle	Dingle	West Kerry	1	2015
Dr Crokes	Killarney	East Kerry	6	2018
Kenmare Shamrocks	Kenmare	Kenmare District	1	1983
Kerins O'Rahilly's	Tralee	St Brendan's	3	2022
Na Gaeil	Tralee	St Brendan's	0	—
Rathmore	Rathmore	East Kerry	1	2011
Spa	Killarney	East Kerry	0	—
Templenoe	Templenoe	Kenmare District	0	—

== Group stage ==
=== Group 1 ===
Pos	Team	Pld	W	D	L	Diff	Pts	Qualification
1	Spa	3	3	0	0	+22	6	Advance to Knockout Stage
2	Kenmare Shamrocks	3	2	0	1	+3	4	Advance to Knockout Stage
3	Templenoe	3	1	0	2	-8	2	
4	Na Gaeil	3	0	0	3	-17	0	Advance to relegation playoff

Round 1

13 August 2023 Round 1	Kenmare Shamrocks	0–19 (19) – (16) 1–13	Na Gaeil	Fitzgerald Stadium
13:30 IST (UTC+1)		(HT: 0–09 – 0–05)
	Pts: S O'Shea 6 (3fs), K O'Sullivan 5, D Ciuciu, S O'Brien 2 each, D Crowley, D Hallissey, J McCarthy, P O'Connor 1 each	Report	Gls: J Bourke 1 Pts: D Devine 5 (4fs), D O'Connor 3, K O'Donovan 2, D Burns 1 (1'45), O Maunsell, D Reen 1 each	Referee: P O'Sullivan (Firies)

13 August 2023 Round 1	Templenoe	0–08 (8) – (16) 0–16	Spa	Kenmare
14:00 IST (UTC+1)		(HT: 0–03 – 0–11)
	Pts: K Spillane 5 (2fs), G Crowley, S O'Sullivan, C Crowley 1 each	Report	Pts: E Cronin 8 (2fs, 1mk), C Murphy 3 (1mk), S Cronin 2 (1f), D Moynihan 2, C Tobin 1	Referee: B Griffin (Clounmacon)

Round 2

19 August 2023 Round 2	Na Gaeil	0–10 (10) – (23) 3–14	Spa	Killeen
19:00 IST (UTC+1)		(HT: 0–04 – 2–09)
	Pts: D Devine 4 (1f), J Doyle, J Barry, D O'Connor, J Sheehan, D Reen, K O'Connor 1 each	Report	Gls: M Foley, E Cronin, C Tobin 1 each Pts: D Moynihan, M Moynihan 3 each, L Spillane, E Cronin, C Murphy 2 each, C Tobin 1 (1mk), S Cronin 1	Referee: P Curtin (Brosna)

20 August 2023 Round 2	Kenmare Shamrocks	2–07 (13) – (12) 0–12	Templenoe	Kenmare
14:00 IST (UTC+1)		(HT: 1–05 – 0–08)
	Gls: J Lehane, S O'Sullivan 1 each Pts: S O'Shea 3 (1f), J Lehane, S O'Brien, K O'Sullivan, M McCarthy 1 each	Report	Pts: K Spillane 6 (2fs), S O'Sullivan 4 (1mk), M Reilly, C Crowley 1 each	Referee: S Mulvihill (St Senan's)

Round 3

26 August 2023 Round 3	Spa	1–14 (17) – (16) 1–13	Kenmare Shamrocks	Tullig
18:30 IST (UTC+1)		(HT: 0–10 – 0–07)
	Gls: D Moynihan 1 Pts: C Murphy 4, C Tobin 3 (1mk), M Foley 2 (1f), E Cronin 2, S Cronin 1 (1'45), L Spillane, M McCarthy 1 each	Report	Gls: T O'Sullivan 1 (1p); Pts: S O'Shea 10 (6fs, 1mk), S O'Brien, D Hallissey, K O'Sullivan 1 each	Referee: B Brosnan (Glenflesk)

26 August 2023 Round 3	Templenoe	1–10 (13) – (12) 0–12	Na Gaeil	Templenoe
18:30 IST (UTC+1)		(HT: 0–04 – 0–06)
	Gls: A Crowley 1 Pts: K Spillane 5 (2fs), A Crowley 2 (1f), S O'Sullivan, S Sheehan, A Spillane 1 each	Report	Pts: D Reen 5, D Devine, D O'Connor 2 each (1f), J Sheehan, M Madden, J Doyle 1 each	Referee: J Purcell (Kilcummin)

=== Group 2 ===
Pos	Team	Pld	W	D	L	Diff	Pts	Qualification
1	Dr Crokes	3	3	0	0	+17	6	Advance to Knockout Stage
2	Dingle	3	2	0	1	+17	4	Advance to Knockout Stage
3	Rathmore	3	1	0	2	+1	2	
4	Kerins O'Rahilly's	3	0	0	3	-35	0	Advance to relegation playoff

Round 1

12 August 2023 Round 1	Rathmore	1–20 (23) – (13) 0–13	Kerins O'Rahilly's	Fitzgerald Stadium
17:00 IST (UTC+1)		(HT: 1–12 – 0–06)
	Gls: P Murphy 1 Pts: C Spiers 6 (3fs), S Ryan 3, B O'Keeffe, P Murphy, J Darmody 2 each, D Murphy, M Ryan, C Ryan, F Murphy, C Collins 1 each	Report	Pts: D O'Sullivan 3 (2'45, 1f), T Hoare, D O'Connor 2 each (2fs), B J Keane 2 (1f), S McElligott, B Hanafin, T Walsh, C Hayes 1 each	Referee: B Fleming (Currow)

12 August 2023 Round 1	Dr Crokes	1–09 (12) – (11) 0–11	Dingle	Austin Stack Park
19:00 IST (UTC+1)		(HT: 0–05 – 0–04)
	Gls: M Burns 1 (1p); Pts: M Burns 2 (1f), D Shaw, M Casey 2 each, M O'Shea, B Looney, T Doyle 1 each	Report	Pts: P Geaney 4 (2fs), C Geaney 3 (2fs), C Flannery, T O'Sullivan, B Devane, D Geaney 1 each	Referee: S Joy (Laune Rangers)

Round 2

19 August 2023 Round 2	Dr Crokes	2–11 (17) – (5) 0–05	Kerins O'Rahilly's	Lewis Road
19:00 IST (UTC+1)		(HT: 0–02 – 0–03)
	Gls: M O'Shea, C McMahon 1 each Pts: K O'Leary 2 (2fs), B Courtney 2 (1'45), B Looney, M Casey 2 each, D Casey 1 (1f), T Doyle, M Potts,	Report	Pts: T Hoare 1 (1f), C Coffey, D Moran, B Hanafin, C Hayes 1 each	Referee: B O'Shea (Keel)

20 August 2023 Round 2	Dingle	2–14 (20) – (15) 3–06	Rathmore	Dingle
14:00 IST (UTC+1)		(HT: 1–06 – 1–04)
	Gls: C Geaney, B O'Connor 1 each Pts: C Geaney 5 (4fs), D Geaney, P Geaney 3 each, G Curran 1 (1'45), C Flannery, C Bambury 1 each	Report	Gls: M Ryan, C Ryan, S Ryan 1 each Pts: S Ryan 3 (3fs), B O'Keeffe, F Murphy, J Moynihan 1 each	Referee: D Clifford (Laune Rangers)

Round 3

27 August 2023 Round 3	Kerins O'Rahilly's	0–14 (14) – (27) 3–18	Dingle	Strand Road
16:00 IST (UTC+1)		(HT: 0–05 – 0–12)
	Pts: B Hanafin, C Hayes 3 each, T Hoare 2 (2fs), J Foley, D O'Connor 2 each, D O'Sullivan, T Walsh 1 each (1f)	Report	Gls: D Geaney, C Geaney, P Geaney 1 each Pts: D Geaney 4, C Geaney 3 (1f), T O'Sullivan 3, P Geaney 2 (1f), D O'Sullivan, C Bambury 2 each, B O'Connor, B Devane 1 each	Referee: D Casey (Scartaglin)

27 August 2023 Round 3	Rathmore	1–11 (14) – (18) 1–15	Dr Crokes	Rathmore
16:00 IST (UTC+1)		(HT: 0–06 – 0–09)
	Gls: M Ryan 1 Pts: C Spiers 6 (5fs), S Ryan 3, J Darmody 1	Report	Gls: M Burns 1 (1p); Pts: M Burns 5 (3fs), D Shaw 3, B Looney 2, C Keating, T Doyle, B Courtney, C McMahon, A Hennigan 1 each	Referee: P O'Sullivan (Firies)

== Knockout stage ==
=== Semi-finals ===
2 September 2023
15:00 IST (UTC+1)
Semi-final 1

Report

Spa	1–12 (15) – (24) 2–18	Dingle
(HT: 0–04 – 1–09)
Gls: C Tobin 1 Pts: E Cronin 4 (2fs), M O'Donoghue 2, M Foley 1 (1f), L Spillane, S Cronin, D Moynihan, T Moynihan, C Spillane 1 each		Gls: M Geaney 1 (1p), P Geaney 1 Pts: C Bambury 4, C Geaney 3 (1mk, 1f), D Geaney 3, P Geaney 2 (1mk), T O'Sullivan, M Geaney 2 each, L O'Connor, E de Hora 1 each

Tullig
Referee: Paul Hayes (Kerins O'Rahilly's)

2 September 2023
18:00 IST (UTC+1)
Semi-final 2

Report

Dr Crokes	0–12 (12) – (17) 1–14	Kenmare Shamrocks
(HT: 0–06 – 1–07)
Pts: M Burns 7 (4fs), K O'Leary 1 (1f), M O'Shea, B Courtney, T Doyle, C McMahon 1 each		Gls: D Ciuciu 1 Pts: S O'Shea 8 (4fs, 2mks, 1'45), S O'Brien 2, D O'Shea, D Hallissey, J Lehane, T O'Sullivan 1 each

Lewis Road
Referee: D Clifford (Laune Rangers)

=== Final ===
9 September 2023
19:00 IST (UTC+1)
Final

Report

Dingle	1–09 (12) – (11) 0–11	Kenmare Shamrocks
(HT: 1–04 – 0–06)
Gls: D Geaney 1 Pts: D Geaney 3 (1f), C Geaney 3 (2fs), P Geaney 3 (3fs)		Pts: S O'Shea 9 (6fs), S O'Brien 2

Austin Stack Park, Tralee
Referee: B O'Shea (Keel)

=== Relegation playoff ===
28 October 2023
16:30 IST (UTC+1)
Relegation play-off

Report

Na Gaeil	1–17 (20) – (16) 0–16 (a.e.t.)	Kerins O'Rahilly's
(HT: 0–05 – 0–08) (FT: 0–13 – 0–13)
Gls: D Devine 1 Pts: J Sheehan 4 (1f), D Devine 3 (2fs), D Burns 2 (2fs), J O'Connor 2, D Reen 1 (1f), J Doyle, M Madden, D O'Connor, D Goggin, J Bourke 1 each		Pts: J Savage 8 (7fs), B J Keane, C Hayes 2 each, J Foley, C Coffey, D Moran, S McElligott 1 each

Austin Stack Park
Referee: E Walsh (Rathmore)

Note
Kerins O'Rahilly's are relegated to the Intermediate Championship for 2024

== See also ==
- 2023 Kerry Senior Football Championship
