= Seamus McIntyre =

Irish hurler and Gaelic footballer

Personal information
- Born: 1971 Kenmare, Kerry, Ireland
- Died: 22 April 2001 (age 29) Cork, Ireland
- Occupation: Garda Síochána

Sport
- Football Position: Full Back
- Hurling Position: Full Back
Clubs
- Years: Club
- Killarney Legion; Kenmare; Gort; Ballincollig
Inter-county
- Years: County
- 1990's 1990's: Kerry (F); Kerry (H)
Inter-county titles
	Football	Hurling
Munster Titles		0
All-Ireland Titles	0	0
League titles	0	0
All-Stars	0	0

Seamus McIntyre (1971–22 April 2001) was a dual player from Kenmare, County Kerry.

== Background ==
McIntyre was born in 1971 to PJ and Mamie McIntyre. His father was a Garda as well as a former Kerry hurler and footballer and a GAA administrator, while his mother had been very closely involved in the Community Games movement. He had a brother, Padraig, and a sister, Geraldine.

McIntyre had been an outstanding campaigner with the Kerry hurlers in the 1990s, playing against top teams such as Clare, Offaly, Tipperery, Kilkenny, Galway and Waterfprd. He also played with the Kerry junior football team during this time winning a Munster Junior Football Championship medal with them in 1995. He played with the Kenmare club before his work with the Garda Síochána took him to County Galway where he joined the Gort club and later to County Cork where he joined Ballincollig.

To date he has been the only person to captain a Garda College team to a Fitzgibbon Cup Final in 1997 when they lost out to UCC.

== Death and legacy ==
On 22 April 2001, McIntyre and fellow Kerryman and Garda George Rice were in Cork responding to an emergency call when their patrol car when they lost control and collided with a hackney travelling in the opposite direction. Both died as a result. Rice (age 45) was a husband and father of three and McIntyre had been engaged at the time of the accident. The accident was due to a faulty gearbox and in 2007 the court approved a settlement order for the families in the sum of €75,000.

An annual hurling tournament in his name is played each year between Garda teams from around the country.
