= Na Gaeil GAA =

Gaelic Games club (e. 1979)

Na Gaeil
- Founded: 1979
- County: Kerry
- Colours: White and green
- Grounds: Killeen, Oakpark, Tralee, County Kerry

Playing kits
Standard colours

Na Gaeil are a Gaelic games club from the town of Tralee in County Kerry, Ireland. The club was founded in 1979 (47 years ago), as a fourth club for its town.

Na Gaeil won the Kerry Intermediate Club Championship in 2021, meaning the club would participate for the first time in the Kerry Senior Football Championship in 2022. The club secured its first win at that level in its opening game, against Kenmare in Killarney.

Notable players in the club's short history include 2022 All-Ireland SFC winners Jack Barry, Diarmuid O'Connor and Stefan Okunbor.

Na Gaeil won the All-Ireland Junior Club Football Championship in 2020, defeating Rathgarogue-Cushinstown of Wexford in the final at Croke Park.

The club qualified for the final of the 2021 Munster Intermediate Club Football Championship, defeating Drom & Inch by a single point in the semi-final. Na Gaeil won the Munster title but lost its All-Ireland Intermediate Club Football Championship semi-final to Steelstown.

== Notable players ==
- Jack Barry
- William Kirby
- Diarmuid O'Connor
- Stefan Okunbor
