= Milltown/Castlemaine GAA =

Gaelic games club in County Kerry, Ireland

Milltown/Castlemaine
- Baile an Mhuillinn/Caisleán na Mainge
- Founded: 1889
- County: Kerry
- Colours: Green & White
- Grounds: Páirc de Búrca
- Coordinates: 52°08′33.01″N 9°43′07.33″W

Playing kits
Standard colours

Milltown/Castlemaine is a Gaelic Athletic Association club in Milltown, County Kerry, Ireland.

== History ==
The club was founded in 1889, but the exact date is not clear. The club's first appearance in the Kerry Senior Football Championship was the following year. In 1891, Milltown entered two teams. It was the only club to do so. This was a great feat as both teams were composed of 21 players. They had some success with the A team, the Milltown Volunteers, winning a few games, only to be beaten by Laune Rangers. In 1892 the club entered one team. It won the first two games beating Cordal and Tough, only to be defeated by Ballymacelligott. Milltown club then seems to have declined for a few years as it didn't contest the County Championship again until 1900.

After 1913, Milltown GAA Club no longer appears to have contested the County Football Championship. In 1947 Milltown won the Mid Kerry Senior Football Championship. Early in the 1950s it amalgamated with Castlemaine and as Milltown-Castlemaine won this championship in 1953, 1955, 1957, 1961, 1962, 1972, 1989, 2001, 2007, 2008 and most recently in 2010.

They also won the Kerry Novice Football Championship in 1979 and the Kerry Junior Football Championship in 1990. Milltown/Castlemaine won the Kerry Intermediate Football Championship in 1991, 1994 and again in 2003.

In 2001 the club had an historic year, winning the Kerry County Football League - Division 1 title and also the Mid-Kerry Championship. 2004 was a special year for the club when they won the Kerry Club Championship.

== Football titles ==
- Kerry Club Championship (1)
  - 2004
- Centenary Cup (1)
  - 2003
- Kerry Intermediate Football Championship (5)
  - 1991, 1994, 2003, 2011, 2023
- All-Ireland Intermediate Club Football Championship (1)
  - 2012
- Munster Intermediate Club Football Championship (1)
  - 2011
- Kerry Junior Football Championship (1)
  - 1990
- Kerry Novice Football Championship (1)
  - 1979
- Munster Intermediate League (1)
- All-County Football League, Division 1 (2)
  - 2001, 2009
- All-County Football League, Division 2 (4)
  - 1989, 1999, 2004, 2011
- All-County Football League, Division 3 (1)
  - 1988
- Mid Kerry Senior Football Championship (16)
  - 1947, 1953, 1954, 1955, 1961, 1962, 1965, 1972, 1989, 2001, 2007, 2008, 2010, 2012, 2014, 2019
- Mid-Kerry Football League (13)
  - 1972, 1988, 1992, 1997, 2002, 2003, 2005, 2006, 2008, 2009, 2010, 2014, 2016
- O'Sullivan Cup (5)
  - 1979, 1986, 1987, 1988, 1993

== Notable players ==
- Seán Burke
- Ian Twiss

=== Wille Maher ===
Willie Maher must have created some kind of history in 1980 when, after he received a pass from Ambrose O’Donovan, he cracked home a goal with his first touch of the ball in Croke Park.

That was approx. three minutes into the All Ireland minor semi-final against Meath and Kerry went on to win the All Ireland that year and so Willie claimed his first All Ireland medal.

Indeed, only four people in the club area hold All Ireland minor medals, Derry Griffin (1933), Benny O’Sullivan (1946), Mike Colgan (1975) and Willie (1980).

From an early age it became clear that Willie would make it all the way to the top as, at eight years of age, he lined out for the Milltown/Castlemaine U12 as they reached the Mid-Kerry U12 final only to be beaten by Laune Rangers.

From then on he gave over twenty five years dedicated service to the club, winning almost every honour in the game.

At County level he holds medals at all senior grades, Novice (1979), Junior (1991), Intermediate (1991 and 1994) and Senior (1992 with Mid Kerry) Indeed, in the 1979 Kerry Novice Football Championship final he scored 1–1 at the age of 16 years when they beat Knocknagoshal to win their first title at county level.

While at university he played in a Sigerson Cup final and a Dublin Under 21 Football Championship final with UCD, but lost both.

After two years on the Kerry minor team he progressed to the senior ranks and played his first senior Munster final in Killarney's Fitzgerald Stadium in 1984, scoring a goal as Kerry overcame Cork to claim the title. However, later that year his promising career took a setback when he picked up a serious leg injury in an Under-21 championship game.

There is no doubt that this injury had a serious impact on his playing career in the green and gold of Kerry, but showing tremendous courage and resilience, he once again donned the jersey.

Having won County U21 (with Mid Kerry) and National League honours ( v Galway), his crowning glory came in 1986 when, after recovering from that broken leg sustained two years earlier, he fought his way back into the County panel and lined out at No 10 as Kerry staged a dramatic comeback to beat Tyrone and claim another three in a row.

Paddy Ball was Willie's marker on that day and even though he didn't score on final day he certainly played his part and indeed was hugely instrumental in getting them there.

He was introduced as a first half sub in the semi – final against Meath and with the game finely poised after the interval, he ran on to a Jack O'Shea flick to score a cracking goal which turned the game in Kerry’s favour. His performance insured he kept his place for the final.

He also collected a Munster Senior Football Championship senior medal that year to add to the 1984 one, won another in 1991 and was also part of the Kerry team on Munster final day in 1988 and 1989.

Willie was captain of the Mid Kerry team that lost the 1990 final to West Kerry but gained that elusive county senior championship medal when they returned, backboned by Milltown/Castlemaine players, two years later and defeated St. Brendans in the final to capture the Bishop Moynihan Cup. During his playing career with Milltown/Castlemaine Willie trained both senior and minor teams and despite living in Kilcummin continued to show allegiance to his home club until 1998 when he eventually transferred to East Kerry club Kilcummin.

Since his transfer he both played with and trained the senior team. He picked up another county division 2 medal when they made their return to division 1, and was a member of the panel that reached the 2002 Kerry Senior Football Championship final, which they lost to Kerins O'Rahilly's.

Achievements:

- All-Ireland Minor Football Championship winner – 1980
- All-Ireland Senior Football Championship winner – 1986
- National League – 1984
- Munster Minor Football Championship – 1980
- Munster Senior Football Championship – 1984, 1986, 1991
- Kerry Novice Football Championship – 1979
- Kerry Junior Football Championship – 1991
- Kerry Intermediate Football Championship – 1994
- Kerry Under-21 Football Championship – 1980 (with Mid Kerry)
- Kerry Senior Football Championship – 1992 (with Mid Kerry)
- Mid Kerry Senior Football Championship – 1989
- Mid Kerry Senior Football League – 1992
- Kerry Senior Football League division 3 – 1988; division - 1989; county league division 2 – 1999 (with Kilcummin)
- O’Sullivan Cup – 1978, 1979, 1986, 1987, 1988, 1990, 1991.

=== Mike Colgan ===
1994 brought down the curtain on one of the most distinguished careers of any Gaelic footballers in this area. In 1974 when Castlemaine man Mike Colgan first donned the senior green jersey of Milltown/Castlemaine club, little did he know the successful and honour laden career that lay before him. The following year 1975 was to bring him his first inter-county honour when he played left corner back on the Kerry minor football team that won the Munster minor title, and then the All-Ireland minor final by defeating Tyrone on a scoreline of 1–10 to 0–4.

As well as those already mentioned in the victorious minor team when you consider that those under 21 teams contained such players as Paudie O’Shea, Tim Kennelly, Denis ‘Ogie’ Moran, Tommy Doyle and Pat Spillane you cannot help but notice that Mike Colgan played with and held his position with elite of Kerry football. It was perhaps somewhat unfortunate that he came good at a time when the likes of Paudie O’Shea, Jimmy Deenihan and company were untouchable.

In another era he would surely have had a line and distinguished career at senior level. Indeed, when Kerry were thinking of the replacement of people like John O’Keeffe, Pat McCarthy and company The Kerryman newspaper said of Colgan: "But they have plenty of reserve in Kerry – a lad we must hear about in a few years in young Colgan, a low-sized corner back in whose vicinity not even crows fly because he’d hold them and pull them down as clean as a whistle."

As it was his senior outings were limited and his only other inter-county honour come in 1983 when Kerry won the All-Ireland Junior Football Championship title when first defeating Dublin in the home final and then easily defeating Yorkshire in the outright final on a scoreline of 0–15 to 0–2 in Tralee.

His only major disappointment is that he did not add a Kerry Senior Football Championship medal to his list of count honours. He did go close on two occasions, being defeated in the 1975 final in controversial circumstances after a replay with Austin Stacks, and in 1978 when Mid Kerry were defeated by Feale Rangers. Although he missed the ’78 final, he had played a major part in getting to the final and would surely have got a medal had they won.

On the two other occasions in recent times that Mid Kerry reached the final Colgan was not part of the panel. In 1990, when defeated by West Kerry, club and family commitments prevented him while in the glory year on 1992, when they eventually captured the cup, he was at the winding down stage of his career.

At club level, he has won: County novice, county junior, county intermediate, and division 2 and division 3 medals. Additionally, he has won Mid Kerry League championship, plus numerous O’Sullivan Cup honours.

Of all the years involved, he has won the names in the years of 1989 and 1990. For that two-year stint he trained his local club and under his tuition the club won promotion to division 1 in the county league for the first time in its history. They also won the Kerry Junior Football Championship title and, the Mid Kerry senior football championship. It was a 17-year lapse and on the way to triumph claimed the scalp of Laune Rangers the then reigning county senior football champions.

Brother Fergal of the Presentation Brothers School, Milltown Mike readily admits, was the biggest influence on his career, He coached him underage and it was he who set the whole show in motion by putting Mike forward for a Kerry minor trial in 1975.

Among the many opponents he encountered throughout his career, Mike recalls Paudie Lynch and Pat Spillane as particularly challenging. After two decades of travelling between football grounds, changing rooms, and various modes of transport, he decided to retire in 1994. His career included experiences at Croke Park on major final days as well as competitions in the lower divisions. He began his playing career at the highest level with his county and concluded it successfully with his club.

=== Achievements ===
- All-Ireland Minor Football Championship – 1975;
- All-Ireland Under-21 Football Championship – 1975, 1976;
- Munster Minor Football Championship – 1975;
- Munster Under-21 Football Championship – 1975, 1976;
- All-Ireland Junior Football Championship – 1983;
- Kerry Junior Football Championship – 1990;
- Kerry Novice Football Championship – 1979;
- Kerry Intermediate Football Championship – 1991;
- Mid Kerry Senior Football Championship – 1989;
- Kerry County Football League Division 3 – 1988;
- Kerry County Football League Division 3 – 1988;
- Kerry County Football League Division 2 – 1989,
- O’Sullivan Cup – 1978, 1979, 1986, 1987, 1988, 1990, 1991.
