= Kenmare Shamrocks GAA =

Gaelic games club in County Kerry, Ireland

Kenmare Shamrocks
- Na Seamróige An Neidín
- Founded: 1888
- County: Kerry
- Colours: Black and Red
- Grounds: Fr Breen Park
- Coordinates: 51°52′52.50″N 9°34′07.82″W

Playing kits
Standard colours

Senior Club Championships
	All Ireland	Munster champions	Kerry champions
Hurling:	-	-	3

Kenmare Shamrocks GAA (Irish: Craobh Chumann Iomána & Peile na Seamróige An Neidín) is a Gaelic Athletic Association club from Kenmare in County Kerry. The club plays both Gaelic Football and Hurling and is affiliated with Kenmare District. The football first team competes in the Kerry Senior Football Championship (tier 1) and the hurlers first team competes in the Kerry Intermediate Hurling Championship. (tier 2).

Football is the more dominant sport in the club and their first team compete in the Kerry Senior Football Championship, the highest level of gaelic football in Kerry. Until the club gained senior status in 2017, players in the club competed in a joint divisional side with other clubs from the Kenmare District like Templenoe. In underage, the clubs players also play with the divisional team.

The hurling team compete in the Kerry Intermediate Hurling Championship, the second level of hurling in the county. Kenmare Shamrocks have won the Kerry Senior Hurling Championship on three occasions including the first ever championship in 1889.

== History ==
The Kenmare Athletic Club was founded on 25 September 1888 when they held a meeting with the newly formed GAA. The club was originally named after Daniel O'Connell, a famous Kerry politician. Kenmare played in the inaugural County Kerry Championships in Football and Hurling in 1889. The footballers lost that year in the quarter final to eventual champions Laune Rangers.

Hurling

They played in the 1889 Munster Senior Hurling Championship final as Kerry rep Hurling used to be the dominant game in the Roughty River valley as indicated by the fact that on St. Patrick's Day in 1858 a game of hurling was played between two games called Kenmare Guards in Hoboken, New Jersey, USA. Kenmare also won the first Kerry Senior Hurling Championship on 19 May 1889 versus Kilmoyley GAA. In 1895 Kenmare were in another hurling final but this time lost to Kilmoyley GAA. They won the 1902 County Hurling final against Tralee Celtic, lost the 1904 final to the same team and then won in 1916 and lost the final in 1917. Kenmare's last hurling County title was won in 1942 although they did reach the final 4 more times in 1943, '45, '47 and 1991.

In 1983 & and 1988 Kenmare won the County Minor Championship and lost the 1986 final to Austin Stacks. In 1984 and 1992 All Ireland Hurling Féile na nGael titles were won.

In the 2000s the club won 3 County Intermediate Chamampionships in 2000, 2004 and 2005, they also played in finals in 2008, 2009 and 2010. In 2010 they won another County Minor Championship. They won another county Intermediate title in 2012. In under age hurling Kenmare have for long teamed up with the neighbouring parish Kilgarvan to field teams in County competitions.

Football

In 1940 the County Intermediate Football title was won.

From the 1970s onwards Gaelic Football became the dominant sport in Kenmare. In 1974 the Kenmare District Team won the Kerry Senior Football Championship. In 1972 & 1983 Kenmare represented Kerry in the Munster Senior Club Football Championship and on each occasion were narrowly beaten by the club championship specialists Nemo Rangers from Cork The 1980s proved to be an era for under age successes at football with many Co. competitions being won. U21 Football and a host of other under age hurling and football titles came our way. In 1982 the Club won an All Ireland Minor Football competition.

The club colours today are red & black and these were adopted in the late 1960s; the previous colours being blue & gold. The Club's home ground is Father Breen Park and it has two playing fields with a new synthetic training ground being developed. A new sports hall has also been completed and this should add to the promotion of hurling as indoor hurling has contributed hugely to the present day position of hurling in the greater Kenmare area. In fact Kenmare Kenmare Club pioneered the concept of indoor coaching in hurling and football in Kerry in the late 1970s.

== Honours ==
Football

- Kerry Senior Football Championship
  - (silver) Runners-Up (1): 2026
- Kerry Club Football Championship
  - (gold) Winners (1): 1983
- Kerry County Football League – Division 1
  - (gold) Winners (2): 1972, 2026
- Kerry Intermediate Football Championship
  - (gold) Winners (6): 1940, 1968, 1970, 1972, 1990, 2016
  - (silver) Runners-Up (3): 1942, 1949, 1991
- Munster Intermediate Club Football Championship
  - (gold) Winners (1): 2016
- Kerry Junior Football Championship
  - (gold) Winners (1): 2012
- Munster Junior Club Football Championship
  - (gold) Winners (1): 2012
- All-Ireland Junior Club Football Championship
  - (silver) Runners-Up (1): 2013
- Kenmare District Senior Football Championship
  - (gold) Winners (9): 1979, 1982, 1983, 1986, 1987, 1988, 2000, 2003, 2011
  - (silver) Runners-Up (10): 1978, 1980, 1981, 1984, 1985, 1990, 1993, 2005, 2010, 2014

Hurling

- Kerry Senior Hurling Championship
  - (gold) Winners (3): 1889, 1902, 1942
  - (silver) Runners-Up (8): 1895, 1904, 1910, 1916, 1917, 1945, 1947, 1991
- Kerry Intermediate Hurling Championship
  - (gold) Winners (6): 1980, 2000, 2004, 2005, 2014, 2025
  - (silver) Runners-Up (4): 2008, 2009, 2010, 2019
- Kerry Under-21 hurling championship
  - (gold) Winners (4): 1987, 1988, 1989, 2019 (with Kilgarvan/Dr Crokes)
  - (silver) Runners-Up (3): 1984, 1986, 1999
- Kerry Minor Hurling Championship
  - (gold) Winners (4): 1959 (with Kilgarvan) 1983, 1988, 2010
  - (silver) Runners-Up (1): 1986
- Féile na nGael Division 3 Michael Cusack Trophy
  - (gold) Winners (1): 1984
- Féile na nGael Division 4 Dr Birch Trophy
  - (gold) Winners (1): 1992

== Notable players ==
- Seán O'Shea 2022 All-Ireland Senior Football Championship winning captain. All-Ireland Minor Football Championship winning captain. GAA/GPA Young Footballer of the Year 2019. Three time All-Star.
- Mickey O'Sullivan 1975 All-Ireland Senior Football Championship winning captain. All-Star winner.
- P. J. McIntyre Dual player with Kerry and Offaly.
- Seamus McIntyre Dual player with Kerry
- Paul O'Connor (Gaelic footballer)
- Stephen O'Brien Two time All-Ireland Senior Football Championship winner.

== See also ==
- Kenmare GAA (District Team)
