= Rathmore, County Kerry =

Town in County Kerry, Ireland

Rathmore Irish: An Ráth Mhór
- Town
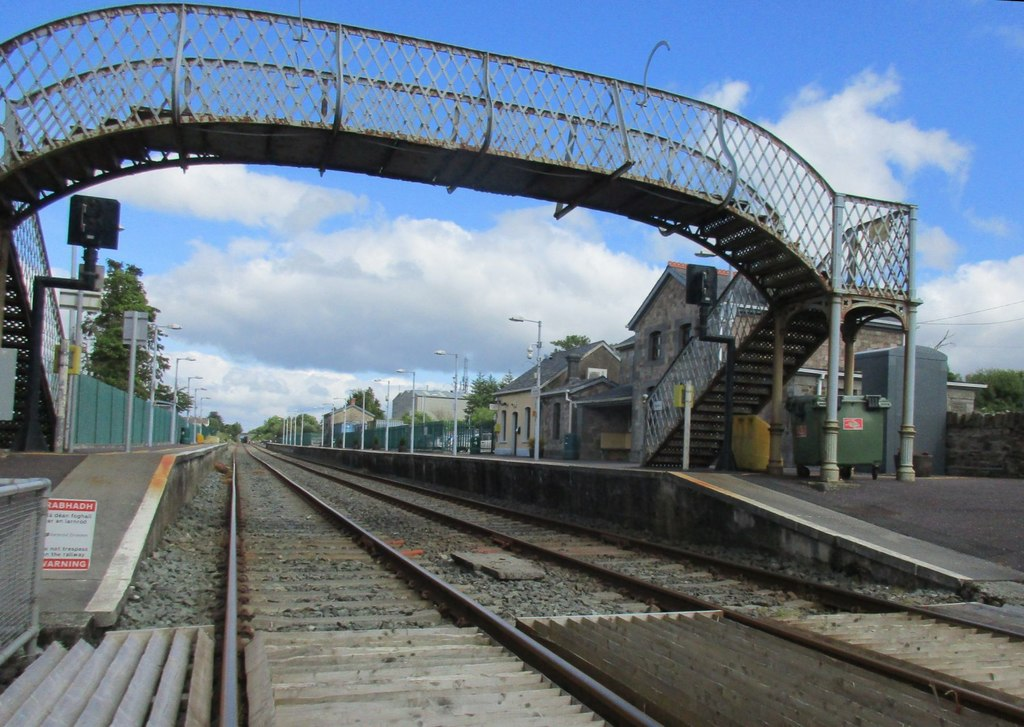
- Rathmore Station

- Location in Ireland
- Coordinates: 52°05′04″N 9°12′35″W
- Country: Ireland
- Province: Munster
- County: County Kerry

Population (2022)
  - Total: 766
- Time zone: UTC+0 (WET)
  - Summer (DST): UTC-1 (IST (WEST))
- Irish Grid Reference: W165931

Rathmore (Irish: An Ráth Mhór, meaning 'big ringfort') is a small town in County Kerry, Ireland, lying immediately west of the border with County Cork. It is divided in two parts, one being the main commercial centre, and the other being the administrative centre where the schools and churches are located which is colloquially known as Rath Beg (Irish: An Ráth Bheag, meaning 'small ringfort'). It lies at the heart of the Sliabh Luachra area known for its traditional Irish music and culture. The local Gaelic Athletic Association club is Rathmore GAA. The SAG (social action group) is in Rathmore and helps the elderly in the area. The town hosts the farmer's market every Saturday in the community centre.

== History ==
Rathmore is the birthplace of numerous Irish scholars including Eoghan Rua Ó Súilleabháin (poet), Aogán Ó Rathaille (poet and writer), and Patrick Dineen (compiled an Irish-English Dictionary).

== Sport ==
Rathmore has a strong Gaelic football tradition and frequently contributes to the Kerry inter-county team. Whenever the Kerry football team wins the All-Ireland Senior Football Championship, the returning team stops first in Rathmore to greet the crowds as soon as their train from Dublin crosses the county border, before proceeding to victory parades and to show the Sam Maguire Cup to crowds in Tralee and Killarney.

== School ==
Rathmore Community School is a large feeder school for the universities and other third-level institutions in Ireland particularly for University College Cork and the University of Limerick.

== Economy ==
Around 1948 Cadbury took over an established creamery and developed a chocolate crumb plant and condensed milk plant. By the early 1950s, the plant was supplying a third of Cadbury's needs for milk for UK production, as milk production was rationed in the UK until April 1954. It opened in June 1948. Cadbury Ireland later opened a new plant.

In 1954 Rathmore production halved, as UK milk production was no longer restricted. In England & Wales, Cadbury took 8m more gallons of milk.

== Transport ==
The Mallow–Tralee railway line passes through the town and offers frequent services to Cork, Dublin Heuston and Tralee via Killarney and Farranfore (for Kerry Airport). It is particularly busy during evenings and weekends and is the access point for all rail users in the surrounding areas. Rathmore railway station opened on 1 December 1854 and was closed for goods traffic on 3 November 1975.

Bus Éireann also offers a service between Cork and Tralee through Rathmore.

== See also ==
- List of towns and villages in Ireland
