= Milltown, County Kerry =

Milltown Baile an Mhuilinn (Irish)
- Town
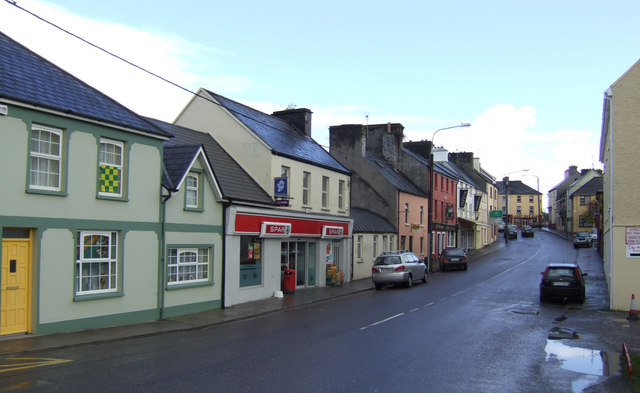
- Bridge Street, on the N70

- Location in Ireland
- Coordinates: 52°08′40″N 9°42′57″W
- Country: Ireland
- Province: Munster
- County: County Kerry
- Elevation: 30 m (98 ft)

Population (2022)
  - Total: 1,118
- Time zone: UTC+0 (WET)
  - Summer (DST): UTC-1 (IST (WEST))
- Eircode (Routing Key): V93
- Irish Grid Reference: Q823006

Milltown (Irish: Baile an Mhuilinn, meaning 'town of the mill') is a small town on the N70 national secondary road between the major towns of Tralee and Killarney in County Kerry, Ireland. It is approximately 7 kilometres (4 mi) from Killorglin.

== Prehistory ==
In July 2015, a Neolithic tomb at Killaclohane near Milltown was excavated and human remains were uncovered that could potentially be 6,000 years old. They are thought to have belonged to the earliest settlers in the southwest of the country.

== History ==
Between the 13th and 16th centuries, much of land surrounding Milltown was owned by the nearby Killagha Abbey, the ruins of which now stand one and a half miles outside the town. Following the Dissolution of the Monasteries, the estates were granted to the Spring family and then, following the Irish Confederate Wars, to the Godfrey family. The modern day settlement at Milltown was developed by Captain John Godfrey in the 1750s as the central town of their estate. The development of Milltown was a deliberate attempt at urban planning by the Godfreys who hoped such development would increase the income and prosperity of their estate through rents, market tolls and the promotion of industries.

The Milltown Halt railway station opened on 1 November 1886 and closed on 1 February 1960.

=== Kilcoleman Abbey ===
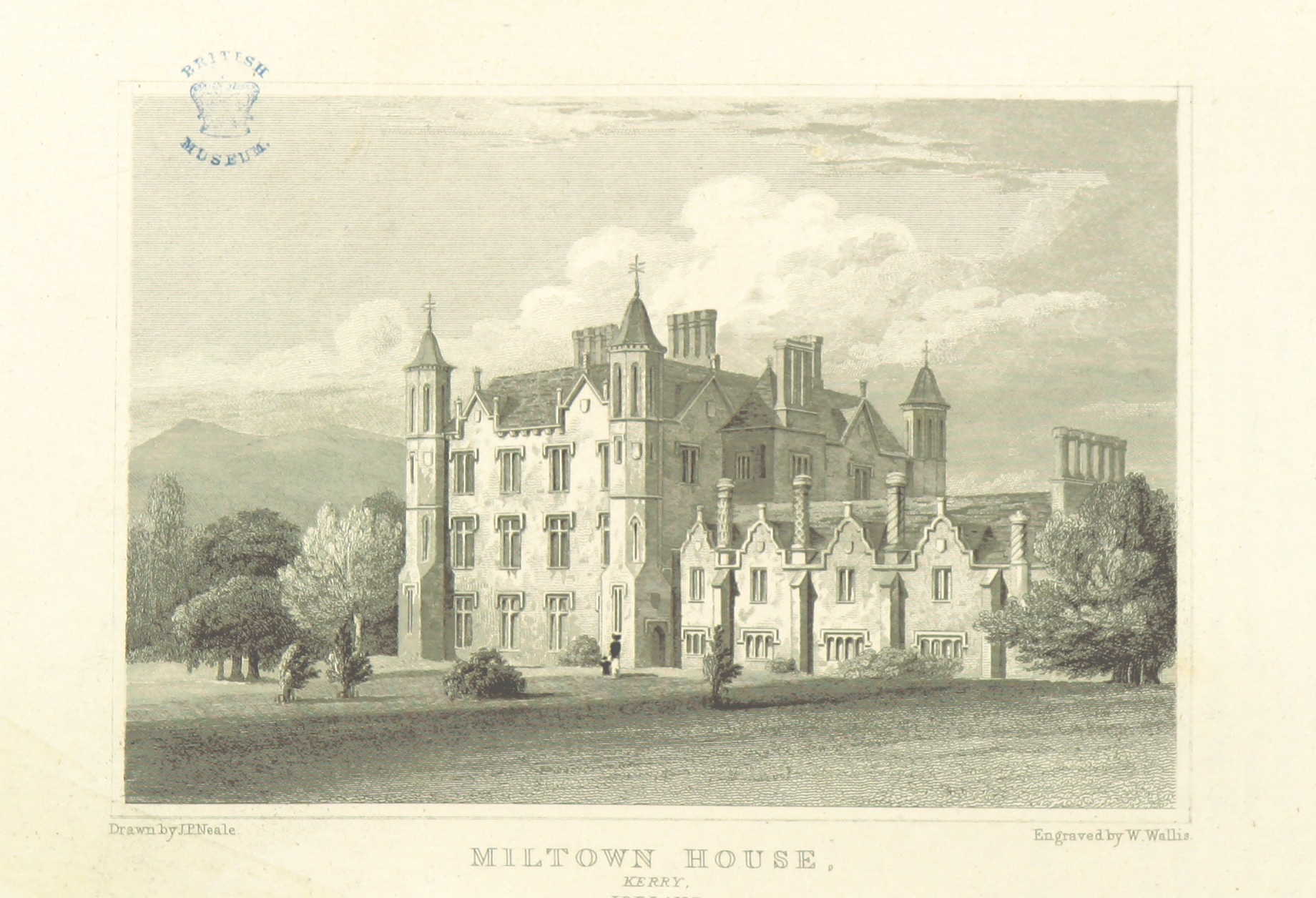
Kilcoleman Abbey, engraved by Neale (previously known as Bushfield House) demolished in the 1970s

Bushfield House was built for Sir William Godfrey, 1st Baronet in the 1770s after the original Bushfield House, a long low thatched house was destroyed by fire. More or less abandoned from 1800 to 1818, Bushfield was renovated under the second Baronet, Sir John Godfrey, according to plans drawn up by the architect, William Vitruvius Morrison and renamed Kilcoleman Abbey. However the general economic decline of the 1820s meant that only the stables and service wing, with its Flemish gables, were completed as planned. Later, in the early 1840s, Sir William Godfrey, 3rd Baronet further modified the main block of the house, adding an attic storey, a turret emblazoned with the Red Hand of Ulster, the traditional shield of a Baronet and assorted gables, pinnacles and buttresses. Inside, the main reception rooms were remodelled in the then-popular Gothic style with plasterwork by local craftsmen, making extensive use of the Godfrey crest. The house was the centre of a 6,000-acre estate and was lived in continually by the Godfrey family until 1958. The last owner, Miss Phyllis Godfrey, confronted by an infestation of dry rot, was forced to abandon the house for the gate lodge where she died in December 1959. The house was eventually demolished in 1977.

== Amenities and development ==
Milltown has a number of pubs, several take-away restaurants, a bakery, two vets, a butcher's shop, a Roman Catholic parish church, a Church of Ireland church, two schools and a shopping market. Milltown hosts a number of annual festivals and events including the World Bodhrán Championships

As of the early 21st century, Milltown has grown in population and a number of housing developments have been built. The 2011 census showed that Milltown was the fastest growing village in Kerry between 2006 and 2011, in which time its population more than doubled from 415 to 838. By the time of the 2022 census, the population had grown to 1,118.

Milltown/Castlemaine GAA Club is the local Gaelic Athletic Association club.

== Notable people ==
- Curry Foley (1856–1898), professional baseball player who played in the American National League from 1879 to 1883
- Walter Spring (1620–c.1678), Roman Catholic landowner involved in the Irish Confederate Wars

== See also ==
- List of towns and villages in Ireland
- List of abbeys and priories in Ireland (County Kerry)
