= 1990 Kerry Senior Football Championship =

Gaelic football competition

- Dates: 6 July - 23 September 1990
- Teams: 18
- Sponsor: Allied Irish Bank
- Champions: West Kerry (3rd title); Pat Flahive (captain); Páidí Ó Sé (manager)
- Runners-up: Mid Kerry; Willie Maher (captain); John P. O'Sullivan (manager)

Tournament statistics
- Matches played: 20
- Goals scored: 44 (2.2 per match)
- Points scored: 399 (19.95 per match)
- Top scorer(s): Murt Moriarty (6-08)

The 1990 Kerry Senior Football Championship was the 90th staging of the Kerry Senior Football Championship since its establishment by the Kerry County Board in 1889. The championship ran from 6 July to 23 September 1990.

Laune Rangers entered the championship as the defending champions, however, they were beaten by Beale in the quarter-finals.

The final was played on 23 September 1990 at FitzGerald Stadium in Killarney, between West Kerry and Mid Kerry, in what was their first meeting in the final in 23 years. West Kerry won the match by 4-09 to 0-07 to claim their third championship title overall and a first title in five years.

West Kerry's Murt Moriarty was the championship's top scorer with 6-08.

== Results ==
=== Preliminary round ===
6 July 1990 Preliminary round	East Kerry	1-05 - 2-10	John Mitchels	Kilcummin Grounds
	M Allen 1-0, B O'Donoghue 0-2, R Nolan 0-1, J Courtney 0-1, P Sheehan 0-1.		M Dennehy 0-5, C Kennedy 1-1, J Hegarty 1-1, D McEvoy 0-3.

8 July 1990 Preliminary round	Kenmare	0-16 - 2-06	Killarney	Fr. Breen Park
	P Spillane 0-5, T Harrington 0-3, T Spillane 0-3, K Rice 0-3, M Shea 0-2.		P O'Leary 1-1, D Culloty 1-0, D O'Donoghue 0-2, M McAuliffe 0-2, M Cronin 0-1,

=== First round ===
7 July 1990 First round	Castleisland Desmonds	0-10 - 2-09	Beale	Castleisland Grounds
	C Kearney 0-3, T Brosnan 0-2, D Lyons 0-1, M Downey 0-1, D Browne 0-1, WD O'Connor 0-1, J O'Connor 0-1.		G Costello 1-1, J Costello 1-1, O Moran 0-3, E Liston 0-2, K Boyle 0-1, L Guerin 0-1.

8 July 1990 First round	Kerins O'Rahilly's	0-07 - 2-09	St. Kieran's	STrand Road
	R Fahey 0-4, T Sullivan 0-2, C Sheehy 0-1.		S McElligott 0-6, P Dennehy 1-0, F Casey 1-0, T Hickey 0-3.

8 July 1990 First round	Gneeveguilla	0-10 - 1-08	West Kerry	Gneeveguilla Grounds
	M Finnegan 0-4, J O'Donovan 0-2, S Óg O'Leary 0-2, D Breen 0-1, A O'Donovan 0-1.		S Geaney 1-2, J Hannafin 0-3, G Casey 0-1, B O'Driscoll 0-1, T McCarthy 0-1.

8 July 1990 First round	Mid Kerry	1-14 - 0-03	Shannon Rangers	Páirc de Búrca
	W Maher 0-5, G O'Connor 1-1, C O'Shea 0-4, B Breen 0-1, L Hayes 0-1, L Burke 0-1, J Counihan 0-1.		J Kennedy 0-2, W O'Donnell 0-1.

15 July 1990 First round	Austin Stacks	3-15 - 0-11	Kenmare	Connolly Park
	E Moynihan 1-6, D Aherne 1-4, L Kearns 1-0, P Laide 0-3, M Lynch 0-2.		T Spillane 0-4, P Spillane 0-3, M O'Shea 0-2, S O'Shea 0-1, K Rice 0-1.

15 July 1990 First round	Feale Rangers	0-11 - 0-10	South Kerry	Moyvane Grounds
	P Sweeney 0-6, J Horgan 0-2, J Mulvhill 0-2, P Breen 0-1.		M Fitzgerald 0-6, J Cronin 0-2, S Fitzgerald 0-1, S O'Sullivan 0-1.

15 July 1990 First round	Dr. Crokes	0-12 - 1-09	John Mitchels	FitzGerald Stadium
	G O'Shea 0-5, P O'Shea 0-4, A O'Shea 0-3.		D McEvoy 1-2, M Dennehy 0-5, J Hegarty 0-1, J O'Dowd 0-1.

15 July 1990 First round	St. Brendan's	1-12 - 1-16	Laune Rangers	Ardfert Grounds
	S Murphy 0-4, B McElligott 1-0, C Walsh 0-3, E Ryle 0-2, P Slattery 0-2, E Gaynor 0-1.		J Shannon 0-11, B O'Sullivan 1-0, P Griffin 0-3, J O'Shea 0-2.

22 July 1990 First round replay	John Mitchels	0-09 - 3-10	Dr. Crokes	Austin Stack Park
	M Dennehy 0-5, D McEvoy 0-2, G Kilgallon 0-1, J Higgins 0-1.		C Doherty 1-3, N O'Leary 1-0, P Donoghue 1-0, A O'Shea 0-2, S O'Shea 0-2, M Buckley 0-2, P O'Shea 0-1.

=== Quarter-finals ===
28 July 1990 Quarter-final	Beale	1-15 - 1-09	Laune Rangers	Ballybunion Grounds
	E Liston 0-6, J Costello 1-1, S Liston 0-3, O Moran 0-3, G Costello 0-2.		P McKenna 1-3, B O'Sullivan 0-3, T Johnstone 0-1, T Fleming 0-1, P Griffin 0-1.

29 July 1990 Quarter-final	Feale Rangers	1-09 - 2-06	West Kerry	Moyvan Grounds
	P Mulvihill 1-0, T Mulvihill 0-3, P Sweeney 0-3, J Mulvihill 0-2, S Carrig 0-1.		J Hannafin 1-3, M Moriarty 1-1, F Ashe 0-1, C Geaney 0-1.

29 July 1990 Quarter-final	St. Kieran's	0-09 - 2-07	Mid Kerry	Brosna Grounds
	S McElligott 0-3, T Brosnan 0-3, E Walsh 0-1, P Dennehy 0-1, F Casey 0-1.		S Burke 1-1, W Maher 0-4, T Evans 1-0, J O'Connor 0-2.

29 July 1990 Quarter-final	Dr. Crokes	0-09 - 0-12	Austin Stacks	FitzGerald Stadium
	G O'Shea 0-3, P O'Shea 0-2, A O'Shea 0-2, M Buckley 0-1, S O'Shea 0-1.		P Laide 0-4, E Moynihan 0-2, L Kerins 0-2, J Walsh 0-2, M McKivergan 0-1, D Aherne 0-1.

5 August 1990 Quarter-final replay	West Kerry	4-11 - 2-10	Feale Rangers	Páirc an Aghasaigh
	M Moriarty 1-3, T Óg O'Brien 1-3, C Geaney 1-1, D Higgins 1-0, J Hannafin 0-3, M O'Connor 0-1.		J Mulvihill 1-1, T Mulvihill 1-1, M O'Connor 0-4, J O'Connell 0-4.

=== Semi-finals ===
19 August 1990 Semi-final	Mid Kerry	1-13 - 0-10	Beale	FitzGerald Stadium
	W Maher 0-6, G Doyle 1-0, C O'Shea 0-3, T Evans 0-1, T Hayes 0-1, S Counihan 0-1, B Breen 0-1.		O Moran 0-5, G Costello 0-1, K Boyle 0-1, P Guerin 0-1, E Liston 0-1, L Guerin 0-1.

19 August 1990 Semi-final	West Kerry	3-03 - 1-09	Austin Stacks	FitzGerald Stadium
	M Moriarty 2-0, S Geaney 1-0, C Geaney 0-1, D Higgins 0-1, T O'Connor 0-1.		P Laide 1-1, J Fitzmaurice 0-2, L Kerins 0-2, M McKivergan 0-2, E Moynihan 0-1, J Walsh 0-1.

9 September 1990 Semi-final replay	West Kerry	1-15 - 1-14	Austin Stacks	FitzGerald Stadium
	S Geaney 1-4, T Connor 0-3, J Hannafin 0-3, T Falvey 0-2, M Moriarty 0-2, D Higgins 0-1.		P Laide 0-6, M McKivergan 1-1, E Moynihan 0-2, L Kerins 0-2, D Aherne 0-2, M Lynch 0-1.

=== Final ===
23 September 1990 Final	West Kerry	4-09 - 0-07	Mid Kerry	FitzGerald Stadium
	M Moriarty 2-2, D Farrell 1-2, B O'Driscoll 1-1, S Geaney 0-3, J Hannafin 0-1.		W Maher 0-3, T Evans 0-2, S Burke 0-1, R Joy 0-1.

== Championship statistics ==
=== Top scorers ===
Overall

Rank	Player	Club	Tally	Total	Matches	Average
1	Murt Moriarty	West Kerry	6-08	26	6	4.33
2	Seán Geaney	West Kerry	3-09	18	6	3.00
2	Willie Maher	Mid Kerry	0-18	18	4	4.50
4	Pa Laide	Austin Stacks	1-14	17	4	4.25
5	James Hannafin	West Kerry	1-13	16	6	2.66
6	Martin Dennehy	John Mitchels	0-15	15	3	5.00
7	Eoin Moynihan	Austin Stacks	1-11	14	4	3.50
8	Joe Shannon	Laune Rangers	0-11	11	2	5.50
8	Ogie Moran	Beale	0-11	11	3	3.66
10	Darren Aherne	Austin Stacks	1-07	10	4	2.50

In a single game

Rank	Player	Club	Tally	Total	Opposition
1	Joe Shannon	Laune Rangers	0-11	11	St. Brendan's
2	Eoin Moynihan	Austin Stacks	1-06	9	Kenmare
3	Murt Moriarty	West Kerry	2-02	8	Mid Kerry
4	Darren Aherne	Austin Stacks	1-04	7	Kenmare
4	Seán Geaney	West Kerry	1-04	7	Austin Stacks
6	Murt Moriarty	West Kerry	2-00	6	Austin Stacks
7	Connie Doherty	Dr. Crokes	1-03	6	John Mitchels
7	Pat McKenna	Laune Rangers	1-03	6	Beale
7	James Hannafin	West Kerry	1-03	6	Feale Rangers
7	Murt Moriarty	West Kerry	1-03	6	Feale Rangers
7	Tom Óg O'Brien	West Kerry	1-03	6	Feale Rangers
7	Seán McElligott	St. Kieran's	0-06	6	Kerins O'Rahilly's
7	Paschal Sweeney	Feale Rangers	0-06	6	South Kerry
7	Maurice Fitzgerald	South Kerry	0-06	6	Feale Rangers
7	Eoin Liston	Beale	0-06	6	Laune Rangers
7	Willie Maher	Mid Kerry	0-06	6	Beale
7	Pa Laide	Austin Stacks	0-06	6	West Kerry
