= 1993 Kerry Senior Football Championship =

Gaelic football competition

- Dates: 25 June - 26 September 1993
- Teams: 19
- Sponsor: Allied Irish Bank
- Champions: Laune Rangers (8th title); James O'Shea (captain); John Evans (manager)
- Runners-up: Annascaul; Gene "Bingo" O Driscoll (captain); Johnny O'Donnell (manager)

Tournament statistics
- Matches played: 19
- Goals scored: 21 (1.11 per match)
- Points scored: 379 (19.95 per match)
- Top scorer(s): Maurice O'Carroll (1-19)

The 1993 Kerry Senior Football Championship was the 93rd staging of the Kerry Senior Football Championship since its establishment by the Kerry County Board in 1889. The championship ran from 25 June to 26 September 1993.

Mid Kerry entered the championship as the defending champions, however, they were beaten by Annascaul in the second round. Annascaul made their return to the championship after a 100-year absence.

The final was played on 26 September 1993 at Austin Stack Park in Tralee, between Laune Rangers and Annascaul, in what was their first ever meeting in the final. Laune Rangers won the match by 1-15 to 1-08 to claim their eighth championship title overall and a first title in four years.

Maurice O'Carroll was the championship's top scorer with 1-19.

== Results ==
=== Round 1 ===
25 June 1993 Round 1	Gneeveguilla	0-07 - 1-08	Beale	Gneeveguilla Grounds
	M Finnegan 0-5, S Óg O'Leary 0-1, G Looney 0-1.		F Stack 1-2, E Liston 0-3, B Horgan 0-2, J Fogarty 0-1.

26 June 1993 Round 1	Castleisland Desmonds	1-04 - 0-12	Dr. Crokes	Castleisland Grounds
	B McMahon 1-0, T Brosnan 0-2, WD O'Connor 0-2.		G O'Shea 0-4, C Murphy 0-3, P O'Shea 0-2, N O'Leary 0-1, R Neher 0-1, D Cooper 0-1.

27 June 1993 Round 1	Kerins O'Rahilly's	2-12 - 0-07	John Mitchels	Austin Stack Park
	M O'Carroll 1-6, N O'Mahony 1-0, T Kennedy 0-2, T Kennedy 0-2, J Kelly 0-1, N O'Sullivan 0-1.		K Kelliher 0-2, F O'Brien 0-1, J Higgins 0-1, J Hegarty 0-1, A O'Grady 0-1, G Kilgannon 0-1.

=== Round 2 ===
26 June 1993 Round 2	Annascaul	0-15 - 1-05	Mid Kerry	Paddy Kennedy Memorial Park
	S O'Driscoll 0-3, D Farrell 0-3, W Lynch 0-3, T Doyle 0-2, M Moynihan 0-2, T Falvey 0-1, J Driscoll 0-1.		T Evans 1-0, W Maher 0-3, L Kelliher 0-2.

27 June 1993 Round 2	Feale Rangers	0-10 - 0-08	St. Brendan's	Frank Sheehy Park
	T Walsh 0-2, P Sweeney 0-2, E Bowler 0-2, J Walsh 0-1, D Fitzmaurice 0-1, M Kennelly 0-1, T O'Connell 0-1.		S Murphy 0-5, J Clifford 0-2, T Maunsell 0-1.

27 June 1993 Round 2	St. Kieran's	0-09 - 2-15	Laune Rangers	Cordal Grounds
	S McElligott 0-8, J Keane 0-1.		T Fleming 0-7, J O'Shea 1-1, P Griffin 1-0, T Corkery 0-2, P Prendeville 0-1, J Shannon 0-1, B O'Shea 0-1, B O'Sullivan 0-1, M Hassett 0-1.

27 June 1993 Round 2	West Kerry	1-15 - 1-12	South Kerry	Páirc an Aghasaigh
	S Geaney 0-6, JJ Corduff 1-1, M Moriarty 0-4, C O'Donnell 0-3, T O'Connor 0-1.		M Fitzgerald 0-6, M Galvin 1-1, S O'Sullivan 0-3, D O'Dwyer 0-1, JD O'Shea 0-1.

27 June 1993 Round 2	Kenmare	0-11 - 0-18	East Kerry	Fr. Breen Park
	P Spillane 0-5, E McCarthy 0-3, T Clifford 0-2, T Harrington 0-1.		P O'Donoghue 0-6, G Murphy 0-3, T O'Connor 0-2, D Moynihan 0-2, S Moynihan 0-2, D Ó Dálaigh 0-2, J Crowley 0-1.

27 June 1993 Round 2	Austin Stacks	1-21 - 0-09	Shannon Rangers	Ballyduff Grounds
	O Moynihan 1-4, P Laide 0-5, D McEvoy 0-5, D Aherne 0-3, L Kearns 0-2, M McKenna 0-1. D Sayers 0-1.		J Kennedy 0-4, J O'Connell 0-2, E Hennessy 0-1, B Kiely 0-1, J Mulvihill 0-1.

16 July 1993 Round 2	Dr. Crokes	0-11 - 0-06	Beale	FitzGerald Stadium
	P O'Shea 0-4, B Clarke 0-2, G O'Shea 0-2, C Murphy 0-1, R Neher 0-1, S O'Shea 0-1.		F Stack 0-3, J Horgan 0-2, G Costello 0-1.

17 July 1993 Round 2	Kerins O'Rahilly's	0-09 - 0-08	Killarney	Austin Stack Park
	M O'Carroll 0-3, T Kennedy 0-3, N O'Mahony 0-2, I Mellerick 0-1.		D Culloty 0-3, C O'Grady 0-2, S Culloty 0-1, D O'Donoghue 0-1, J Bowler 0-1.

=== Quarter-finals ===
24 July 1993 Quarter-final	Dr. Crokes	0-10 - 0-07	Feale Rangers	FitzGerald Stadium
	P O'Shea 0-5, G O'Shea 0-2, B Clarke 0-1, R Neher 0-1, C Murphy 0-1.		T Walsh 0-4, M Kennelly (LE) 0-1, M Kennelly (M) 0-1, E Bowler 0-1.

25 July 1993 Quarter-final	Annascaul	0-12 - 0-09	West Kerry	Austin Stack Park
	D Lynch 0-4, G Farrell 0-2, B O'Driscoll 0-1, S O'Driscoll 0-2, G Farrell 0-1, T Doyle 0-1.		M Moriarty 0-3, E Kennedy 0-3, C O'Donnell 0-2, T Óg O'Brien 0-1.

8 August 1993 Quarter-final	Laune Rangers	1-09 - 0-09	Austin Stacks	FitzGerald Stadium
	B O'Shea 1-1, T Fleming 0-3, P Prendeville 0-1, T Corkery 0-1, J Shannon 0-1, G Murphy 0-1, J O'Shea 0-1.		O Moynihan 0-3, D Ahern 0-2, L Kearns 0-1, M McKivegan 0-1, P Laide 0-1, D McEvoy 0-1.

10 August 1993 Quarter-final	Kerins O'Rahilly's	2-07 - 0-04	East Kerry	Austin Stack Park
	G O'Brien 1-0, N O'Mahony 1-0, M O'Carroll 0-3, T Kennedy 0-2, N O'Sullivan 0-1, C Sheehy 0-1.		D Fitzgerald 0-3, D Moynihan 0-1,

=== Semi-finals ===
4 September 1993 Semi-final	Annascaul	1-08 - 1-08	Kerins O'Rahiully's	Austin Stack Park
	M Moynihan 1-0, B O'Driscoll 0-3, G Farrell 0-3, T Falvey 0-1, S O'Driscoll 0-1.		T Kennedy 1-2, G O'Brien 0-3, M O'Carroll 0-2, N O'Sullivan 0-1.

5 September 1993 Semi-final	Laune Rangers	3-13 - 1-11	Dr. Crokes	Austin Stack Park
	B O'Sullivan 1-1, P McKenna 0-4, P Prendeville 1-0, B O'Shea 1-0, T Fleming 0-3, J Shannon 0-3, G Murphy 0-1, J O'Shea 0-1.		G O'Shea 1-1, C Murphy 0-4, P O'Shea 0-3, C Doherty 0-1, C O'Shea 0-1, R Neher 0-1.

12 September 1993 Semi-final replay	Annascaul	0-09 - 0-08	Kerins O'Rahiully's	Austin Stack Park
	W Lynch 0-3, S O'Driscoll 0-2, T Doyle 0-1, J Doyle 0-1, G Farrell 0-1, B O'Driscoll 0-1.		M Carroll 0-5, M Griffin 0-1, N O'Sullivan 0-1, M Nix 0-1.

=== Final ===
26 September 1993 Final	Laune Rangers	1-15 - 1-08	Annascaul	Austin Stack Park
	J O'Shea 1-0, P Griffin 0-3, T Fleming 0-3, G Murphy 0-2, B O'Shea 0-2, P McKenna 0-2, P Prendeville 0-1, T Byrne 0-1, S O'Sullivan 0-1.		G Farrell 0-4, W Lynch 0-4, B O'Driscoll 1-0.	Referee: D O'Sullivan (Currow)

== Championship statistics ==
=== Top scorers ===
Overall

Rank	Player	Club	Tally	Total	Matches	Average
1	Maurice O'Carroll	Kerins O'Rahilly's	1-19	22	5	4.40
2	Timmy Fleming	Laune Rangers	0-16	16	4	4.00
3	Pat O'Shea	Dr. Crokes	0-14	14	4	3.50
3	Weeshie Lynch	Annascaul	0-14	14	4	3.50
5	Ger O'Shea	Dr. Crokes	1-09	12	4	3.00
5	Tommy Kennedy	Kerins O'Rahilly's	1-09	12	5	2.40
7	Owen Moynihan	Austin Stacks	1-07	10	2	5.00
7	Billy O'Shea	Laune Rangers	2-04	10	4	2.50
7	Gene Farrell	Annascaul	0-10	10	4	2.50
10	James O'Shea	Laune Rangers	2-03	9	4	2.25
10	Connie Murphy	Dr. Crokes	0-09	9	4	2.25

In a single game

Rank	Player	Club	Tally	Total	Opposition
1	Maurice O'Carroll	Kerins O'Rahilly's	1-06	9	John Mitchels
2	Seán McElligott	St. Kieran's	0-08	8	Laune Rangers
3	Owen Moynihan	Austin Stacks	1-04	7	Shannon Rangers
3	Timmy Fleming	Laune Rangers	0-07	7	St. Kieran's
5	Seán Geaney	West Kerry	0-06	6	South Kerry
5	Maurice Fitzgerald	South Kerry	0-06	6	West Kerry
5	Paud O'Donoghue	East Kerry	0-06	6	Kenmare
8	Fergus Stack	Beale	1-02	5	Gneeveguilla
8	Tommy Kennedy	Kerins O'Rahilly's	1-02	5	Annascaul
8	Mike Finnegan	Gneeveguilla	0-05	5	Beale
8	Séamus Murphy	St. Brendan's	0-05	5	Feale Rangers
8	Pat Spillane	Kenmare	0-05	5	East Kerry
8	Pa Laide	Austin Stacks	0-05	5	Shannon Rangers
8	Donal McEvoy	Austin Stacks	0-05	5	Shannon Rangers
8	Pat O'Shea	Dr. Crokes	0-05	5	Feale Rangers
8	Maurice O'Carroll	Kerins O'Rahilly's	0-05	5	Annascaul

=== Miscellaneous ===
- Annascaul made their first appearance at senior level since 1893.
- Annascaul qualified for the final for the first time.
