= Kerry Junior Football Championship =

Annual Gaelic football competition

- Code: Gaelic football
- Founded: 1971
- Region: Kerry (GAA)
- No. of teams: 16
- Title holders: Finuge (4th title)
- First winner: Dingle
- Most titles: Finuge (4 titles)
- Sponsors: Kerry Petroleum
- Official website: Official website

The Kerry Junior Football Championship (known for sponsorship reasons as Kerry Petroleum County Junior Football Championship and abbreviated to the Kerry JFC) is an annual Gaelic football competition organised by the Kerry County Board of the Gaelic Athletic Association and contested by the second highest ranked junior clubs in the county of Kerry in Ireland. It is the fourth tier overall in the entire Kerry Gaelic football championship system.

The championship began in 1971 as the Kerry Novice Football Championship. Following a restructuring of the entire Kerry Gaelic football championship system at all levels in 2016 the Kerry Premier Junior Football Championship was created which resulted in the Novice Championship being renamed the Kerry Junior Football Championship. As a result, the champions no longer enter the Munster Junior Club Football Championship.

In its current format, the 16 participating club are drawn into four groups of four teams and play each other in a round-robin system. The four group winners and the four runners-up proceed to the knockout phase that culminates with the Final. The winner of the Kerry Junior Championship, as well as being presented with the Cup, are promoted to the Kerry Premier Junior Football Championship.

== Format ==
=== Group stage ===
The 16 clubs are divided into four groups of four. Over the course of the group stage, each team plays once against the others in the group, resulting in each team being guaranteed three group games. Two points are awarded for a win, one for a draw and zero for a loss. The teams are ranked in the group stage table by points gained, then scoring difference and then their head-to-head record. The top two teams in each group qualify for the quarter-finals.

=== Knockout stage ===
Quarter-finals: The 4 group winners and 4 group runners-up contest this round. A group winner will play a group runner-up of another group. The two winners from these two games advance to the semi-finals.

Semi-finals: The four quarter-final winners contest this round. The two winners from these two games advance to the final.

Final: The two semi-final winners contest the final. The winning team are declared champions and are promoted to the Kerry Premier Junior Football Championship.

== Teams ==
=== 2026 Teams ===
Club	Location	Colours	Division	In championship since	Championship titles	Last championship title
Asdee	Asdee	Black and amber	Shannon Rangers	2025	0	—
Ballylongford	Ballylongford	Blue and white	Shannon Rangers	2025	0	—
Beale	Ballybunion	Green, red and black	Shannon Rangers		1	1980
Cordal	Cordal	Blue and yellow	St Kieran's		1	1986
Cromane	Cromane	Maroon and white	Mid Kerry		0	—
Finuge	Finuge	Green and Gold	Feale Rangers		3	2004
Kilgarvan	Kilgarvan	Red and white	Kenmare District		0	—
Knocknagoshel	Knocknagoshel	Green and yellow	St Kieran's		0	—
Lispole	Lispole	Green and yellow	West Kerry		2	2018
Moyvane	Moyvane	Green and gold	Feale Rangers		0	—
Scartaglin	Scartaglen	Maroon and white	St Kieran's		0	—
Skellig Rangers	Portmagee	Green and yellow	South Kerry	2024	1	2008
Sneem-Derrynane	Derrynane and Sneem	Tangerine and black	South Kerry		1 (as Sneem)	1997
St Michael's/Foilmore	Ballinskelligs	Green and red	South Kerry	2023	1	2001
Tuosist	Tuosist	Green and red	Kenmare District		0	—
Valentia Young Islanders	Valentia Island	Red and yellow	South Kerry	2023	1	1981

== List of finals ==
Year	Winners		Runners-up	
Year	Club	Score	Club	Score
2026	Finuge	0-13	Knocknagoshel	0-12
2025	Tarbert	2-13	Beale	3-09
2024	Duagh	2-11	Tarbert	1-11
2023	Reenard	1-14	Tarbert	0-06
2022	Firies	1-17	Cordal	0-11
2021	Castlegregory	3-17	Firies	0-12
2020	Annascaul	2-16	Castlegregory	0-10
2019	Ballyduff	2-09	Renard	0-12
2018	Lios Póil	1-11	Beale	1-08
2017	Listry	2-12	Castlegregory	2-11
2016	Fossa	2-12	Beale	0-08
2015	Templenoe	1-14	Glenbeigh-Glencar	1-06
2014	Brosna	0-08	Dromid Pearses	0-07
2013	Keel	1-09	Glenbeigh-Glencar	1-07
2012	Kenmare Shamrocks	0-13	Na Gaeil	0-10
2011	Dromid Pearses	0-08	Duagh	1-03
2010	St Mary's		Dromid Pearses	
2009	Castlegregory		Beaufort	
2008	Skellig Rangers		Beale	
2007	Keel		Castlegregory	
2006	Duagh		Renard	
2005	Ardfert		Cordal	
2004	Finuge		Lispole	
2003	Annascaul		Currow	
2002	Finuge		Castlegregory	
2001	St Michael's/Foilmore		Dromid Pearses	
2000	Gneeveguilla		Finuge	
1999	Listowel Emmets		Beaufort	
1998	Rathmore		Finuge	
1997	Sneem		Beale	
1996	St Senan's			
1995	Tarbert		Beaufort	
1994	St Patrick's, Blennerville		St Senan's	
1993	An Ghaeltacht		Rathmore	
1992	St Senan's			
1991	Kilcummin			
1990	Milltown/Castlemaine		Tarbert	
1989	Brosna		Knocknagoshel	
1988	Currow		Rathmore	
1987	Ardfert			
1986	Cordal			
1985	St Senan's		An Ghaeltacht	
1984	Lispole			
1983	St Mary's		Cordal	
1982	Moyvane		Ardfert	
1981	Valentia Young Islanders		Lispole	
1980	Beale		St Mary's	
1979	Annascaul		St Mary's	
1978	Gneeveguilla		St Mary's	
1977	Beaufort		Gneeveguilla	
1976	An Ghaeltacht			
1975	Templenoe	1-05	Moyvane	1-03
1974	Castlegregory			
1973	Kilcummin			
1972	Listowel Emmets		Glenflesk	
1971	Dingle			

== Roll of honour ==
=== By club ===
#	Team	Titles	Runners-Up	Winning years	Losing years
1	Finuge	4	2	1982, 2002, 2004. 2026	1998, 2000
2	Castlegregory	3	4	1974, 2009, 2021	2002, 2007, 2017, 2020
2	Annascaul	3	0	1979, 2003, 2020, 2026	—
4	St Mary’s	2	3	1983, 2010	1978, 1979, 1980
4	Tarbert	2	3	1995, 2025	1990, 2023, 2024
4	Lispole	2	2	1984, 2018	1981, 2004
4	An Ghaeltacht	2	1	1976, 1993	1985
4	Gneeveguilla	2	1	1978, 2000	1977
4	Duagh	2	1	2006, 2024	2011
4	Kilcummin	2	0	1973, 1991	—
4	Listowel Emmets	2	0	1972, 1999	—
4	Ardfert	2	0	1987, 2005	—
4	Keel	2	0	2007, 2013	—
4	Brosna	2	0	1989, 2014	—
4	Templenoe	2	0	1975, 2015	—
16	Beale	1	5	1980	1997, 2008, 2016, 2018, 2025
16	Beaufort	1	3	1977	1995, 1999, 2009
16	Cordal	1	3	1986	1983, 2005, 2022
16	Rathmore	1	3	1998	1988, 1993, 1996
16	Dromid Pearses	1	3	2011	2001, 2010, 2014
16	Reenard	1	2	2023	2006, 2019
16	St Senan's	3	1	1985 1992 1996	1994
16	Currow	1	1	1988	2003
16	Firies	1	1	2022	2021
16	Dingle	1	0	1971	—
16	Valentia Young Islanders	1	0	1981	—
16	Milltown/Castlemaine	1	0	1990	—
16	St Patrick’s, Blennerville	1	0	1994	—
16	Sneem	1	0	1997	—
16	St Michael's/Foilmore	1	0	2001	—
16	Skellig Rangers	1	0	2008	—
16	Kenmare Shamrocks	1	0	2012	—
16	Fossa	1	0	2016	—
16	Listry	1	0	2017	—
16	Ballyduff	1	0	2019	—
36	Glenbeigh-Glencar	0	2	—	2013, 2015
36	Knocknagoshel	0	2	—	1989, 2026
36	Glenflesk	0	1	—	1972
36	Moyvane	0	1	—	1975
36	Na Gaeil	0	1	—	2012

== See also ==
- Kerry Senior Football Championship (Tier 1)
- Kerry Club Football Championship (Tier 1)
- Kerry Intermediate Football Championship (Tier 2)
- Kerry Premier Junior Football Championship (Tier 3)
- Kerry Novice Football Championship (Tier 5)
