= 1994 Kerry Senior Football Championship =

Gaelic football competition

- Dates: 1 July - 23 October 1994
- Teams: 20
- Sponsor: Allied Irish Bank
- Champions: Austin Stacks (11th title); Pat Slattery (captain); Paukl Lucey (manager)
- Runners-up: Dr. Crokes; Noel O'Leary (captain); Michael O'Grady (manager)

Tournament statistics
- Matches played: 22
- Goals scored: 49 (2.23 per match)
- Points scored: 430 (19.55 per match)
- Top scorer(s): Darren Aherne (1-22)

The 1994 Kerry Senior Football Championship was the 94th staging of the Kerry Senior Football Championship since its establishment by the Kerry County Board in 1889. The championship ran from 1 July to 23 October 1994.

Laune Rangers entered the championship as the defending champions, however, they were beaten by Dr. Crokes in the semi-finals.

The final was played on 23 October 1994 at Austin Stack Park in Tralee, between Austin Stacks and Dr. Crokes, in what was their first ever meeting in the final. Austin Stacks won the match by 0-12 to 1-05 to claim their 11th championship title overall and a first title in eight years.

Darren Aherne was the championship's top scorer with 1-22.

== Results ==
=== Preliminary round ===
1 July 1994 Preliminary round	Castleisland Desmonds	1-05 - 0-07	Killarney	Castleisland Grounds
	M Casey 1-0, WD O'Connor 0-2, J Lordan 0-1, T Prendeville 0-1, M Downey 0-1.		J Doyle 0-3, A Morris 0-1, T Kelly 0-1, P O'Sullivan 0-1, M Cronin 0-1.

2 July 1994 Preliminary round	East Kerry	2-14 - 1-07	Killarney Legion	Glenflesk Grounds
	Paud O'Donoghue 1-7, Pat O'Donoghue 1-0, S Moynihan 0-3, J Crowley 0-2, G O'Sullivan 0-1, J MUrphy 0-1.		S Culloty 1-4, C O'Grady 0-3.

3 July 1994 Preliminary round	John Mitchels	1-11 - 2-05	Shannon Rangers	Austin Stack Park
	F O'Bren 0-8, E Kelliher 1-1, K O'Brien 0-1, B Murphy 0-1.		K Culhane 1-0, S Carrig 1-0, E Hennessy 0-3, D O'Connor 0-1, L Flaherty 0-1.

3 July 1994 Preliminary round	South Kerry	0-13 - 1-10	St. Brendan's	Con Keating Park
	M Fitgerald 0-7, K O'Dwyer 0-3, M Keating 0-1, R Quigley 0-1, S Fitzgerald 0-1.		S Murphy 0-7, P Slattery 1-2, P O'Driscoll 0-1.

28 July 1994 Preliminary round replay	St. Brendan's	0-06 - 1-08	South Kerry	Ardfert Grounds
	Kirby 0-3, S Murphy 0-2, P O'Driscoll 0-1.		J O'Shea 1-0, S Fitzgerald 0-3, K O'Dwyer 0-2, P Keane 0-2, D Dwyer 0-1.

=== Round 1 ===
2 July 1994 Round 1	Feale Rangers	0-10 - 0-10	Annascaul	Moyvane Grounds
	M Mulvihill 0-3, E Bowler 0-2, A O'Brien 0-2, G Stack 0-1, A Walsh 0-1, E Breen 0-1.		B Driscoll 0-4, G Farrell 0-2, Seán Farrell 0-2, S O'Driscoll 0-1, G Williams 0-1.

3 July 1994 Round 1	Austin Stacks	6-22 - 2-02	Beale	Austin Stack Park
	D Aherne 1-8, D McEvoy 2-3, G Lynch 2-3, E Moynihan 0-6, D Sayers 1-0, P Laide 0-1, M McKivergan 0-1.		B Scanlon 1-1, J Farrell 1-0, M Foley 0-1.

3 July 1994 Round 1	St. Kieran's	0-07 - 2-12	West Kerry	Ballymacelligott Grounds
	S McElligott 0-4, C Fleming 0-1, D Dennehy 0-1, K Scanlon 0-1.		C O'Donnell 1-3, D Ó Cinnéide 0-4, J Dorgan 1-0, S Geaney 0-3, J Wieboldt 0-1, F Ashe 0-1.

8 July 1994 Round 1	Castleisland Desmonds	1-03 - 0-17	Laune Rangers	Castleisland Grounds
	T Prendeville 1-0, M Downey 0-2, K O'Sullivan 0-1.		T Fleming 0-5, B O'Sullivan 0-3, G Murphy 0-3, C Kearney 0-2, P Griffin 0-2, L Hassett 0-1, P Prendeville 0-1.

10 July 1994 Round 1	Mid Kerry	0-09 - 2-12	Dr. Crokes	Páirc de Búrca
	W Maher 0-2, L Kelliher 0-2, S Barton 0-2, C O'Shea 0-1,		G O'Shea 1-4, C Murphy 1-1, P O'Shea 0-3, R Neher 0-2, B Clarke 0-1, N O'Leary 0-1.

29 July 1994 Round 1	John Mitchels	3-13 - 1-04	Gneeveguilla	Austin Stack Park
	F O'Brien 2-7, E O'Callaghan 1-0, J Hegarty 0-3, G Kilgannon 0-2, B Murphy 0-1.		G Looney 1-0, M Finnegan 0-2, S Óg O'Leary 0-1, C McCarthy 0-1.

30 July 1994 Round 1 replay	Annascaul	0-17 - 2-09	Feale Rangers	Paddy Kennedy Memorial Park
	T Doyle 0-9, G Farrell 0-5, B Driscoll 0-2, T McCarthy 0-1.		E Bowler 1-1, M Mulvihill 1-1, G Stack 0-2, P Sweeney 0-1, D Fitzmaurice 0-1, S Stack 0-1, J Dillon 0-1, P Buckley 0-1.

31 July 1994 Round 1	East Kerry	1-13 - 1-09	Kenmare	Glenflesk Grounds
	Paud O'Donoghue 1-5, J Crowley 0-3, Pat O'Donoghue 0-2, D Daly 0-1, D Moynihan 0-1, S Moynihan 0-1.		T Óg O'Brien 0-4, T Harrington 1-0, T Spillane 0-2, P Spillane 0-1, C McSwiney 0-1, F O'Sullivan 0-1.

31 July 1994 Round 1	Kerins O'Rahilly's	1-03 - 0-08	South Kerry	Austin Stack Park
	J O'Dowd 1-0, G O'Brien 0-2, M O'Carroll 0-1.		M Fitzgerald 0-3, J O'Shea 0-2, D Dwyer 0-1, P Keane 0-1, S Fitzgerald 0-1.

=== Quarter-finals ===
29 July 1994 Quarter-final	Austin Stacks	1-10 - 2-05	West Kerry	Austin Stack Park
	J Barry 1-0, O Moynihan 0-3, D Aherne 0-3, J Walsh 0-1, D McEvoy 0-1, M McKivergan 0-1, P Laide 0-1.		C O'Donnell 1-2, S Geaney 1-1, D Ó Cinnéide 0-1, J Wieboldt 0-1.

19 August 1994 Quarter-final	Dr. Crokes	1-17 - 0-08	John Mitchels	FitzGerald Stadium
	G O'Shea 0-5, P O'Shea 0-4, R Neher 1-0, B Clarke 0-3, S O'Shea 0-1, N O'Leary 0-1, B Hennigan 0-1, M Cooper 0-1, D Cooper 0-1.		F O'Brien 0-6, E Kelliher 0-1, J Higgins 0-1.

20 August 1994 Quarter-final	Annascaul	1-12 - 2-10	East Kerry	Austin Stack Park
	T McCarthy 1-0, T Doyle 0-3, B O'Driscoll 0-2, G Farrell 0-2, B Doyle 0-2, G Williams 0-2, S O'Driscoll 0-1.		G O'Sullivan 2-0, Paud O'Donoghue 0-4, J Crowley 0-3, D Moynihan 0-1, Pat O'Donoghue 0-1, D Daly 0-1.

21 August 1994 Quarter-final	Laune Rangers	4-16 - 1-10	South Kerry	Austin Stack Park
	T Byrne 1-1, G Murphy 0-4, J O'Shea 1-0, C Kearney 1-0, B O'Sullivan 1-0, B Griffin 0-3, T Fleming 0-3, P McKenna 0-2, L Hassett 0-1, J Shannon 0-1, B O'Shea 0-1.		J O'Shea 1-3, C O'Dwyer 0-4, M Fitzgerald 0-1, S Fitzgerald 0-1, F Murphy 0-1.

=== Semi-finals ===
4 September 1994 Semi-final	Dr. Crokes	2-08 - 0-10	Laune Rangers	Austin Stack Park
	P O'Shea 1-2, R Neher 1-0, G O'Shea 0-2, B Clarke 0-1, V Casey 0-1, N O'Leary 0-1, C Murphy 0-1.		T Fleming 0-3, J Shannon 0-2, P Griffin 0-2, J O'Shea 0-1, S O'Sullivan 0-1, G Murphy 0-1.

25 September 1994 Semi-final	Austin Stacks	2-07 - 1-08	East Kerry	FitzGerald Stadium
	D McEvoy 1-3, M McKivergan 1-0, D Sayers 0-1, D Ahern 0-1, J Barry 0-1, P Laide 0-1.		J Crowley 1-3, Pat O'Donoghue 0-1, S Moynihan 0-1, Paud O'Donoghue 0-1, J O'Sullivan 0-1, D Dineen 0-1.

=== Final ===
9 October 1994 Final	Austin Stacks	0-13 - 0-13	Dr. Crokes	Austin Stack Park
	O Moynihan 0-4, D Ahern 0-3, P Laide 0-2, D McEvoy 0-2, G Lynch 0-1, C Kennedy 0-1.		P O'Shea 0-4, B Clarke 0-3, G O'Shea 0-2, R Neher 0-2, N O'Leary 0-1, B Hennigan 0-1.

23 October 1994 Final replay	Austin Stacks	0-12 - 1-05	Dr. Crokes	Austin Stack Park
	D Ahern 0-7, D McEvoy 0-3, O Moynihan 0-1, P Laide 0-1.		C Murphy 1-0, G O'Shea 0-3, B Clarke 0-1, P O'Shea 0-1.

== Championship statistics ==
=== Top scorers ===
Overall

Rank	Player	Club	Tally	Total	Matches	Average
1	Darren Aherne	Austin Stacks	1-22	25	5	5.00
2	Paud O'Donoghue	East Kerry	2-17	23	4	5.75
3	Donal McEvoy	Austin Stacks	3-12	21	5	4.20
4	Fergal O'Brien	John Mitchels	2-13	19	2	9.50
5	Ger O'Shea	Dr. Crokes	1-16	19	5	3.80
6	Pat O'Shea	Dr. Crokes	1-14	17	5	3.40
7	John Crowley	East Kerry	1-11	14	4	3.50
7	Owen Moynihan	Austin Stacks	0-14	14	5	2.80
9	Tommy Doyle	Annascaul	0-12	12	4	6.00
10	James O'Shea	South Kerry	2-05	11	4	2.75
10	Conor O'Donnell	West Kerry	2-05	11	2	5.50
10	Timmy Fleming	Laune Rangers	0-11	11	3	3.66
10	Maurice Fitzgerald	South Kerry	0-11	11	4	2.75

In a single game

Rank	Player	Club	Tally	Total	Opposition
1	Fergal O'Brien	John Mitchels	2-07	13	Gneeveguilla
2	Darren Aherne	Austin Stacks	1-08	11	Beale
3	Paud O'Donoghue	East Kerry	1-07	10	Killarney Legion
4	Donal McEvoy	Austin Stacks	2-03	9	Beale
4	Gerry Lynch	Austin Stacks	2-03	9	Beale
4	Tommy Doyle	Annascaul	0-09	9	Feale Rangers
7	Paud O'Donoghue	East Kerry	1-05	8	Kenmare
7	Fergal O'Brien	John Mitchels	0-08	8	Shannon Rangers
9	Seán Culloty	Killarney Legion	1-04	7	East Kerry
9	Ger O'Shea	Dr. Crokes	1-04	7	Mid Kerry
9	Maurice Fitzgerald	South Kerry	0-07	7	St. Brendan's
9	Séamus Murphy	St. Brendan's	0-07	7	South Kerry
9	Darren Aherne	Austin Stacks	0-07	7	Dr. Crokes

=== Miscellaneous ===
- Austin Stacks won a first title in eight years.
- Austin Stacks moved to the top of the roll of honor with 11 titles.
- Austin Stacks and Dr Crokes face each other in the final for the first time.
- The final goes to a re-play for the first time since 1987.
