= Brosna GAA =

Brosna GAA may refer to:

- Brosna Gaels GAA, a hurling club in Leamonaghan, County Offaly, Ireland
- Brosna GAA (Kerry), a football club in Brosna, County Kerry, Ireland
