= 1996 Kerry Senior Football Championship =

Association football championship

- Dates: 14 June - 20 October 1996
- Teams: 18
- Sponsor: Allied Irish Bank
- Champions: Laune Rangers (10th title); Mark O'Connor (captain); John Evans (manager)
- Runners-up: West Kerry; Colm Geaney (captain); Frank Dorgan (manager)

Tournament statistics
- Matches played: 21
- Goals scored: 34 (1.62 per match)
- Points scored: 469 (22.33 per match)
- Top scorer(s): Seán Geaney (3-17)

The 1996 Kerry Senior Football Championship was the 96th staging of the Kerry Senior Football Championship since its establishment by the Kerry County Board in 1889. The draw for the opening round fixtures took place on 26 February 1996. The championship ran from 14 June to 20 October 1996.

Laune Rangers entered the championship as the defending champions.

The final was played on 20 October 1996 at Austin Stack Park in Tralee, between Laune Rangers and West Kerry, in what was their first ever meeting in the final. Laune Rangers won the match by 2-07 to 1-09 to claim their 10th championship title overall and a second title in succession.

West Kerry's Seán Geaney was the championship's top scorer with 3-17.

== Results ==
=== Round 1 ===
16 June 1996 Round 1	Mid Kerry	2-14 - 1-11	St. Brendan's	Páirc de Burca
	M Burke 1-1, V O'Donoghue 1-1, S Barton 0-4, I Twiss 0-3, I O'Shea 0-3, L Kelleher 0-1, L Burke 0-1.		T O'Connell 1-1, S Wallace 0-3, C Walsh 0-2, J Hegarty 0-2, J Enright 0-1, L Nolan 0-1, B Clifford 0-1.

16 June 1996 Round 1	Laune Rangers	0-17 - 0-04	Annascaul	J. P. O'Sullivan Park
	L Hassett 0-5, G Murphy 0-4, A Hassett 0-1, J Sheehan 0-1, P O'Sullivan 0-1, B O'Shea 0-1, J O'Shea 0-1, B O'Sullivan 0-1, C Kearney 0-1, P McKenna 0-1.		W Lynch 0-3, B O'Driscoll 0-1.

=== Round 2 ===
14 June 1996 Round 2	St. Kieran's	1-17 - 0-09	John Mitchels	Currow Grounds
	R O'Rahilly 0-5, McGlynn 0-5, G O'Keeffe 1-0, P Dennehy 0-3, D Dennehy 0-2, C Fleming 0-1, J Keane 0-1.		B Dennehy 0-3, K Murphy 0-2, John Collins 0-2, F O'Connor 0-1, O Kelleher 0-1.

16 June 1996 Round 2	Kenmare	0-12 - 0-20	Feale Rangers	Kenmare Grounds
	P Spillane 0-7, F O'Sullivan 0-2, M Murphy 0-2, J O'Sullivan 0-1.		M Kennelly 0-6, N Kennelly 0-5, J Walsh 0-3, G Stack 0-2, B Scanlon 0-1, M Mulvihill 0-1, E Bowler 0-1, E Breen 0-1.

28 June 1996 Round 2	Shannon Rangers	1-11 - 0-15	Killarney Legion	Ballylongford Grounds
	M O'Connor 1-1, J Kennedy 0-4, L Ware 0-2, E Liston 0-2, M Enright 0-1, E Hennessy 0-1.		D Culloty 0-5, C O'Grady 0-5, D O'Donoghue 0-2, S Culloty 0-1, J McGillycuddy 0-1, W O'Sullivan 0-1.

29 June 1996 Round 2	Dr. Crokes	0-10 - 0-09	Austin Stacks	FitzGerald Stadium
	P O'Shea 0-4, J Fleming 0-2, V Casey 0-2, C Murphy 0-1, R Neher 0-1.		D Aherne 0-6, P laide 0-3.

30 June 1996 Round 2	East Kerry	1-13 - 1-13	Laune Rangers	FitzGerald Stadium
	P O'Donoghue 0-8, C O'Connor 1-0, D Daly 0-2, J Crowley 0-1, S Moynihan 0-1, S O'Leary 0-1.		G Murphy 1-2, B O'Shea 0-3, L Hassett 0-2, T Byrne 0-1, J Shannon 0-1, S O'Sullivan 0-1, P O'Sullivan 0-1, P Griffin 0-1, J O'Shea 0-1.

30 June 1996 Round 2	West Kerry	3-17 - 0-11	Castleisland Desmonds	Páirc an Aghasaigh
	B Hanafin 2-1, S Geaney 0-6, C O'Donnell 1-0, D Ó Sé 0-3, D Ó Cinnéide 0-3, F Ó Sé 0-2, JJ Corduff 0-1, F Ashe 0-1.		J Brennan 0-5, M Downey 0-3, D Hanafin 0-2, S Curtin 0-1.

30 June 1996 Round 2	South Kerry	0-13 - 0-08	Mid Kerry	Páirc na nGael
	M Fitzgerald 0-5, D Lynch 0-3, JD O'Shea 0-3, D Dwyer 0-2.		L Burke 0-2, S Barton 0-2, I Twiss 0-1, K O'Sullivan 0-1, M Burke 0-1, J Daly 0-1.

30 June 1996 Round 2	Kerins O'Rahilly's	0-08 - 1-05	Spa/Gneeveguilla	Austin Stack Park
	J Morrissey 0-2, K Savage 0-1, P O'Connor 0-1, M Carroll 0-1, G O'Brien 0-1, T McCarthy 0-1, C Sheehy 0-1.		G Cremin 1-0, C Gleeson 0-2, S Moynihan 0-1, S Óg O'Leary 0-1, M Finnegan 0-1.

23 July 1996 Round 2 replay	Spa/Gneeveguilla	1-09 - 1-11 (aet)	Kerins O'Rahilly's	Gneeveguilla Grounds
	C McCarthy 1-2, S Moynihan 0-2, C Gleeson 0-1, J O'Donovan 0-1, A Looney 0-1, M Finnegan 0-1, A O'Donovan 0-1.		M O'Carroll 0-5, S Sheehy 1-1, M Fitzgerald 0-2, T McCarthy 0-1, G O'Brien 0-1, S McCarthy 0-1.

24 July 1996 Round 2 replay	Laune Rangers	1-14 - 0-10	East Kerry	J. P. O'Sullivan
	P O'Sullivan 1-2, G Murphy 0-5, L Hassett 0-3, MF Russell 0-3, B O'Shea 0-1.		P O'Donoghue 0-5, G Murphy 0-3, S Flynn 0-1, J Crowley 0-1.

=== Quarter-finals ===
27 July 1996 Quarter-final	St. Kieran's	1-07 - 0-06	Feale Rangers	Austin Stack Park
	C Fleming 1-2, P Dennehy 0-2, R O'Rahilly 0-1, L Brosnan 0-1, K Cronin 0-1.		B Scanlon 0-2, E Fitzmaurice 0-1, M Kennelly 0-1, S Stack 0-1, J Walsh 0-1.

28 July 1996 Quarter-final	West Kerry	1-16 - 3-10	South Kerry	Austin Stack Park
	M Moriarty 1-2, D Ó Cinnéide 0-5, JJ Corduff 0-3, B Hanafin 0-3, S Geaney 0-1, F Ashe 0-1, C O'Donnell 0-1.		James O'Shea 2-0, K Burns 1-2, John O'Shea 0-5, D Lynch 0-3.

28 July 1996 Quarter-final	Dr. Crokes	2-19 - 0-10	Killarney Legion	FitzGerald Stadium
	B Clarke 1-7, P O'Shea 1-4, R Neher 0-3, J Fleming 0-3, V Casey 0-2.		C O'Grady 0-5, C McNiece 0-2, S Culloty 0-1, J Culloty 0-1, D Culloty 0-1.

21 August 1996 Quarter-final replay	West Kerry	1-12 - 1-11	South Kerry	Austin Stack Park
	S Geaney 1-2, D Ó Cinnéide 0-3, M Moriarty 0-2, JJ Corduff 0-2, C O'Donnell 0-1, J Dorgan 0-1, D Ó Sé 0-1.		M Fitzgerald 0-4, D Quirke 1-0, D Dwyer 0-3, James O'Shea 0-3, D Lynch 0-1.

23 August 1996 Quarter-final	Laune Rangers	0-13 - 1-09	Kerins O'Rahilly's	FitzGerald Stadium
	MF Russell 0-4, T Byrne 0-3, C Kearney 0-2, P O'Sullivan 0-2, S O'Sullivan 0-1, J Shannon 0-1.		J Morrissey 1-1, M Carroll 0-3, N O'Sullivan 0-2, S McCarthy 0-1, G O'Brien 0-1, C Sheehy 0-1.

=== Semi-finals ===
22 September 1996 Semi-final	Laune Rangers	2-10 - 0-06	St. Kieran's	Austin Stack Park
	G Murphy 1-3, M Hassett 1-1, MF Russell 0-2, B Gannon 0-2, B O'Shea 0-1, P Griffin 0-1.		R Rahilly 0-2, L Brosnan 0-1, P Dennehy 0-1, J Keane 0-1, D Dennehy 0-1.	Referee: D Enright (Tarbert)

22 September 1996 Semi-final	West Kerry	2-13 - 2-13	Dr. Crokes	Austin Stack Park
	S Geaney 2-2, C O'Donnell 0-3, D Ó Cinnéide 0-2, B Hanafin 0-2, D Ó Sé 0-1, M Moriarty 0-1, J Ferriter 0-1, S O'Mahony 0-1.		R Naher 0-5, M Buckley 1-0, P O'Brien 1-0, D Cooper 0-2, C Doherty 0-1, C Murphy 0-1, P O'Shea 0-1, N O'Leary 0-1, V Casey 0-1, M Cooper 0-1.

29 September 1996 Semi-final replay	West Kerry	1-09 - 0-08	Dr. Crokes	Austin Stack Park
	D Ó Cinnéide 0-4, S Geaney 0-4, M Moriarty 1-0, B Hanafin 0-1.		B Clarke 0-3, J Fleming 0-2, C Murphy 0-1, M Cooper 0-1, V Casey 0-1.

=== Final ===
20 October 1996 Final	Laune Rangers	2-07 - 1-09	West Kerry	Austin Stack Park
	B O'Shea 1-2, M Hassett 1-0, L Hassett 0-2, MF Russell 0-2, P Griffin 0-1.		D Ó Cinnéide 1-5, S Geaney 0-2, B Hanafin 0-1, JJ Corduff 0-1.	Referee: M O'Sullivan

== Championship statistics ==
=== Top scorers ===
Overall

Rank	Player	Club	Tally	Total	Matches	Average
1	Seán Geaney	West Kerry	3-17	26	6	4.33
2	Dara Ó Cinnéide	West Kerry	1-22	25	6	4.16
3	Gerard Murphy	Laune Rangers	2-14	20	6	3.33
4	Brendan Hannafin	West Kerry	2-08	14	6	2.33
5	Brian Clarke	Dr. Crokes	1-10	13	4	3.25
5	Paud O'Donoghue	East Kerry	0-13	13	2	6.50
7	Pat O'Shea	Dr. Crokes	1-09	12	4	3.00
7	Liam Hassett	Laune Rangers	0-12	12	6	2.00
9	Billy O'Shea	Laune Rangers	1-08	11	6	1.83
9	Mike Frank Russell	Laune Rangers	0-11	11	6	1.83

In a single game

Rank	Player	Club	Tally	Total	Opposition
1	Brian Clarke	Dr. Crokes	1-07	10	Killarney Legion
2	Seán Geaney	West Kerry	2-02	8	Dr. Crokes
2	Dara Ó Cinnéide	West Kerry	1-05	8	Laune Rangers
2	Paud O'Donoghue	East Kerry	0-08	8	Laune Rangers
5	Brendan Hannafin	West Kerry	2-01	7	Castleisland Desmonds
5	Pat O'Shea	Dr. Crokes	1-04	7	Killarney Legion
5	Pat Spillane	Kenmare	0-07	7	Feale Rangers
8	James O'Shea	South Kerry	2-00	6	West Kerry
8	Gerard Murphy	Laune Rangers	1-03	6	St. Kieran's
8	Darren Aherne	Austin Stacks	0-06	6	Dr. Crokes
8	Seán Geaney	West Kerry	0-06	6	Castleisland Desmonds
8	Mike Kennelly	Reale Rangers	0-06	6	Kenmare
