= List of Kerry GAA club competitions =

The Kerry County Board of the Gaelic Athletic Association (GAA) (or Kerry GAA), one of the 32 county boards of the GAA in Ireland, and responsible for Gaelic games in County Kerry, organises sports competitions for the county's clubs. Leagues and Championships are played. The competitions are organised from senior to under-age level. The following is a list of such competitions.

== Football ==
=== Senior Football Championship ===
The Kerry Senior Football Championship is the top level football competition in Kerry. The Kerry County Club Championship is a competition between the clubs (excluding divisions), who participate in the Kerry Senior Football Championship.

=== Intermediate Football Championship ===
The Kerry Intermediate Football Championship is the second level football competition in Kerry.

=== Premier Junior Football Championship ===
The Kerry Premier Junior Football Championship is the third level football competition in Kerry.

=== Junior Football Championship ===
The Kerry Junior Football Championship is the fourth level football competition in Kerry.

=== Novice Football Championship ===
The Kerry Novice Football Championship is the fifth level football competition in Kerry.

Novice finals:

| Year | Winners | Runners-up |
|---|---|---|
| 1991 | Ballyduff 0:08 | Firies 1:04 |
| 1992 | An Ghaeltacht | Ballymacelligott |
| 1993 | Ballymacelligott | Finuge |
| 1994 | Na Gaeil 1:12 | Ballydonoghue 1:10 |
| 1995 | Firies. 2:07 | St Michael's/Foilmore 1:08 |
| 1996 | Finuge 0:09 | Dromid Pearses 0:07 |
| 1997 | Knocknagoshel 1:10 | St Michael's/Foilmore 1:07 |
| 1998 | St Michael's/Foilmore 1:12 | Dromid Pearses 1:05 |
| 1999 | Dromid Pearses 3:13 | Listry 1:04 |
| 2000 | Keel 1:08 | Renard 0:05 |
| 2001 | Renard 0:15 | Tuosist 0:11 |
| 2002 | Duagh 0:11 | Listry 0:05 |
| 2003 | Keel 1:08 | Beale 0:05 |
| 2004 | Glenbeigh/Glencar 2:05 | Churchill 1:06 |
| 2005 | Beale 1:13 | Tuosist 0:15 |
| 2006 | Moyvane 2:13 | Na Gaeil 1:09 |
| 2007 | Cromane 0:11 | Ballydonoghue 2:03 |
| 2008 | Tuosist 1:06 | Scartaglin 0:07 |
| 2009 | Churchill 3:06 | Brosna 1:09 |
| 2010 | Na Gaeil 1:10 | Listry 0:09 |
| 2011 | Brosna 1:09 | Scartaglin 0:11 |
| 2012 | Scartaglin 1:09 | Lios Póil 0:05 |
| 2013 | Templenoe 2:15 | Listry 2:13 |
| 2014 | Listry 0:15 | Lios Póil 1:11 |
| 2015 | St Senans 1:10 | Lios Póil 1:09 |
| 2016 | Lios Póil | Tuosist |
| 2017 | Cromane | Moyvane |
| 2018 | Kilgarvan | Asdee |
| 2019 | Scartaglin | Castlegregory |
| 2020 | Cromane | Asdee |
| 2021 | Moyvane | Sneem/Derrynane |
| 2022 | Kilgarvan | Beale |
| 2023 | Lispole 0-17 | Duagh 0-14 (AET) |
| 2024 | Beale | Moyvane |
| 2025 | Cromane 5:14 | Finuge 1:19 |
| 2026 | St Michael's/Foilmore 1-14 | Scartaglin 1-13 |

In 2016, The Kerry Club Championships were restructured, with immediate effects on the naming of several competitions. The Junior Championship was renamed the Premier Junior, Novice was renamed the Junior Championship and the Novice Shield became the Novice Championship. 2016 Fossa 2:12 Beale 0:08 2017 Listry 2:12 Castlegregory 2:11 2018 Lios Póil 1:11 Beale 1:08

=== Underage ===
==== Kerry Under-21 Football Championship ====
This is the highest level competition for the under-21s.

==== Kerry Minor Football Championship ====
This is the highest level competition for the under-18s.

== Hurling ==
=== Senior Hurling Championships ===
The Kerry Senior Hurling Championship is the top level hurling competition in Kerry.

=== Intermediate Hurling Championship ===
The Kerry Intermediate Hurling Championship is the second level hurling competition in Kerry.

=== Junior Hurling Championship ===
The Kerry Junior Hurling Championship is the third level hurling competition in Kerry

=== Underage ===
==== Kerry Under-21 Hurling Championship ====
This is the highest level competition for the under-21s.

==== Kerry Minor Hurling Championship ====
This is the highest level competition for the under-18s.
