= Jeffrey F. Combs =

American businessman

Jeffrey F. Combs (born July 2, 1956) is a partner and CBDO for US-based MNVO Pond Mobile. Since 1995, Mr. Combs has been living in Moscow where he has been an active manager and investor. Chief among his accomplishments was the creation of OOO NCI, the only remaining 100% foreign-owned fixed line telecoms operator on the Russian market. He has been a member of the American Chamber of Commerce in Russia since 1999, a member of the Board of Directors since 2016 and has served as Co-Chairman of AmCham’s SME committee. He is also a member of the Russian Union of Industrialists and Entrepreneurs, and has served on several of its committees.

== Biography ==
After graduating with honors from Columbia University in 1980 with an MBA in Finance, Mr. Combs spent several years evaluating and advising companies as a member of the M&A group at Lehman Brothers where he worked alongside such Wall Street notables as Stephen Schwarzman and Pete Peterson. Subsequent to that, he spent several years engaged in Wealth Management at Morgan Stanley before embarking on a career as a private investor.

Born in Texas, Mr. Combs moved with his family to St. Louis where he made a name for himself as a starting member of the De Smet 1973 Missouri State Basketball Championship team. Recruited by a number of NCAA division 1 schools, Mr. Combs chose to go to Columbia University where he was a 3-year starter and the recipient of the Sheldon B. Preschell Award (1977) for Academic excellence. He was also nominated for, and a recipient of, an NCAA post-graduate scholarship (1978.) Although he received several requests to participate in the European professional league, after graduation Mr. Combs chose a business career path.

Also an accomplished golfer, Mr. Combs finished fourth in the 2001 Russian Open (Amateur), and is a five-time club champion at the Moscow Country Club. Mr. Combs is also a member of Winged Foot Golf Club (New York) and Ballybunion Golf Club (Ireland).

Mr. Combs is married (Elena), and has two daughters (Ekaterina & Elizaveta). He is the son of James Ford and Elizabeth Newman Combs. Through his mother, he is a descendant of the Venerable John Henry Newman. Mr. Combs' father spent his entire career working at Monsanto where he submitted, and was awarded, over 40 patents on behalf of the company.

== Sources ==
- "NCI acquires MosTel to Create Formidable Alternative Operator", by Anton Novikov for Kommersant, October 17, 2003.
- "Combs 1977 Recipient of Prestigious 'Preschell' Award" by Robert Klapisch, Columbia Daily Spectator / Daily News (New York), April 1977.
- "U.S. Telecoms Rushing to Russia", by Alex Weaver for The Wall Street Journal, March 23, 1994.
