= North Kerry Senior Football Championship =

Annual Gaelic football competition

The Bernard O'Callaghan Memorial North Kerry Senior Football Championship
- Irish: Craobh Sinsear Peile Chiarraí Thuaidh
- Code: Gaelic football
- Founded: 1925
- Region: North Kerry (GAA)
- Trophy: Éamonn O'Donoghue Memorial Cup
- No. of teams: 14
- Title holders: Listowel Emmets (19th title)
- First winner: Moyvane
- Most titles: Listowel Emmets (19 titles)
- Sponsors: McMunn's Bar and Restaurant, Ballybunion
- Official website: www.northkerryfootball.com

The North Kerry Senior Football Championship is a Gaelic football competition for GAA clubs affiliated to the North Kerry Football Board, a division of Kerry GAA. The official name of the competition became The Bernard O'Callaghan Memorial North Kerry Senior Football Championship in 2000, in honour of the late Bernie O'Callaghan (Beale) who was Chairman of the North Kerry GAA Board for 25 years (1974 to 1998) and did a huge amount of work for North Kerry football.

The Championship runs from October to December each year but has on occasion continued into the New Year due to replays and postponements. It is currently sponsored by McMunn's Bar and Restaurant, Ballybunion. The current champions are Listowel Emmets, who defeated Duagh in the 2026 final, winning the competition for the third year in-a-row and a record 19th time overall.

== History ==
The first North Kerry Championship took place in 1925 and was won by Newtownsandes (Moyvane), who defeated Faha. Listowel Emmets have been the most successful team in the Championship with 19 titles. In 1983, shortly after the death of Asdee native Éamonn O'Donoghue (who won 5 Championships with Ballylongford), Castleisland Desmonds and Ballylongford jointly presented a Cup in his honour to the North Kerry Football Board to be presented to the Championship winners each year. As of 2026 fourteen different clubs have won the Championship.

== Format ==
The Championship is played on a straight knock-out basis. First round games give home advantage to first drawn out in ties following an open draw, with all further round matches being played at neutral venues.

=== Current format ===
First round: 12 teams contest this round. The 6 winning teams advance directly to the quarter-final stage. The 6 losing teams are eliminated from the championship.

Quarter-finals: The six first round winners and the two teams given a bye contest this round. The four winners from these four games advance to the semi-finals.

Semi-finals: The four quarter-final winners contest this round. The two winners from these two games advance to the final.

Final: The two semi-final winners contest the final. The winning team are declared champions.

All first round and quarter-final matches are decided on the day, with extra-time and penalties being used if necessary to decide the winner. The semi-finals and final will go to a replay if level at full-time.

== Teams ==
Fourteen clubs compete in the North Kerry Senior Football Championship: five teams from Feale Rangers, three teams from St Kieran's and six teams from Shannon Rangers.

Team	Home Ground	Divisional Side	Founded
Asdee	Jack Walsh Park, Tullahennel	Shannon Rangers	1986
Ballydonoghue	Denis Dowling Park, Coolard	Shannon Rangers	1930s
Ballyduff	Ballyduff Sportsfield, Ballyduff	Shannon Rangers	1911
Ballylongford	O'Rahilly Park, Ballylongford	Shannon Rangers	
Beale	Bob Stack Park, Ballybunion	Shannon Rangers	1972
Brosna	Páirc na Féile, Brosna	St. Kieran's	1970s
Castleisland Desmonds	Moanmore, Castleisland	St. Kieran's	1885
Duagh	Duagh GAA Field, Duagh	Feale Rangers	1891
Finuge	James O'Sullivan Park, Finuge	Feale Rangers	1961
Knocknagoshel	Willie Walsh Park, Knocknagoshel	St. Kieran's	1932
Listowel Emmets	Frank Sheehy Park, Listowel	Feale Rangers	1885
Moyvane	Con Brosnan Park, Moyvane	Feale Rangers	1900
St Senan's	Jackie Finnerty Park, Mountcoal	Feale Rangers	1934
Tarbert	Shannon Park, Tarbert	Shannon Rangers	1904

== 2026 Championship ==
13 teams entered the 2026 championship, with Asdee not competing for the second year in-a-row. The draw for the First Round took place on 5 October at McMunn's Bar & Restaurant, Ballybunion. 10 teams were drawn to play in the First Round with 3 teams receiving byes to the quarter-finals. The draw for the Quarter-Finals was made following the completion of Round 1.

After 3 rounds of competition Duagh played Listowel Emmets in the final. It was be the third time the teams met in the decider with the teams having 1 win each. Emmets retained their title to complete a 3 in-a-row of championships.

=== Round 1 ===
31 October 2026 Round 1	Tarbert	1–16 (19) – (20) 1–17	Brosna	Tarbert
13:00 WET (UTC+0)		(HT: 0–12 - 0–09)
		Report		Referee: P Dowling (Ballylongford)

31 October 2026 Round 1	Moyvane	3–14 (23) – (4) 0–04	Ballylongford	Moyvane
14:30 WET (UTC+0)		(HT: 0–11 - 0–02)
		Report		Referee: P Curtin (Brosna)

31 October 2026 Round 1	Listowel Emmets	1–19 (22) – (15) 1–12	Castleisland Desmonds	Listowel
17:30 WET (UTC+0)		(HT: 0–12 - 0–04)
		Report		Referee: E Moran (Ballydonoghue)

1 November 2026 Round 1	Duagh	1–13 (16) – (10) 0–10	Finuge	Duagh
13:00 WET (UTC+0)		(HT: 0–07 - 0–04)
		Report		Referee: S Mulvihill (St Senan's)

1 November 2026 Round 1	St Senan's	1–12 (15) – (16) 1–13	Ballydonoghue	Mountcoal
14:30 WET (UTC+0)		(HT: 1–06 - 0–11)
		Report		Referee: J Murphy (Ballyduff)

Byes: Ballyduff, Beale, Knocknagoshel

=== Quarter-Finals ===
7 November 2026 Quarter-final	Brosna	1–11 (14) – (15) 0–15	Ballyduff	Mountcoal
14:30 WET (UTC+0)		(HT: 0–07 - 0–05)
				Referee: E Moran (Ballydonoghue)

7 November 2026 Quarter-final	Moyvane	0–13 (13) – (16) 0–16 (a.e.t.)	Beale	Listowel
18:00 WET (UTC+0)		(HT: 0–06 - 0–05) (FT: 0–12 - 0–12)
	Pts: M Stack 3 (3fs), J Kissane 3 (1tp), P O'Connor 2 (1'45), S Stack, M Quinn, M Fogarty, P Brosnan, R Quinn 1 each	Report	Pts: R Stack 5 (3fs, 1tp), D Keane Tyrell 5 (3fs), B O'Neill 2, E Daly 1 (1f), C Toomey, I Mannix, C Scanlan 1 each	Referee: B Griffin (Clounmacon)

8 November 2026 Quarter-final	Ballydonoghue	0–13 (13) – (21) 2–15	Duagh	Ballylongford
13:00 WET (UTC+0)		(HT: 0–08 - 1–10)
	Pts: J Kennelly 5 (3fs, 1tpf), D Sheehy 3 (1f, 1tpf), J Foley, B Ó Seanacháin 2 each, T O'Carroll 1	Report	Gls: C Dillon, T O'Carroll 1 each Pts: C Dillon 3 (1f), T Moloney 3 (1tp), J O'Connell 3, M Kelly, J Maher, N O'Connor 2 each	Referee: P Dowling (Ballylongford)

8 November 2026 Quarter-final	Knocknagoshel	0–09 (9) – (21) 1–18	Listowel Emmets	Moyvane
14:30 WET (UTC+0)		(HT: 0–05 - 0–08)
				Referee: J Murphy (Ballyduff)

=== Semi-finals ===
14 November 2026 Semi-final	Duagh	1–10 (13) – (10) 0–10	Ballyduff	Listowel
18:30 WET (UTC+0)		(HT: 1–02 - 0–05)
	Gls: C Dillon 1 Pts: C Dillon 5 (1f), J Maher, J O'Connell, N O'Connor, M Kirby, K Lucey 1 each	Report	Pts: D Costello 4 (1tpf, 1f), J Enright, K Goulding 2 each, A Segal, K O'Carroll 1 each	Referee: B Griffin (Clounmacon)

15 November 2026 Semi-final	Beale	0–13 (13) – (27) 3–18	Listowel Emmets	Moyvane
14:30 WET (UTC+0)		(HT: 0–06 - 1–05)
	Pts: D Keane Tyrell 7 (6fs), S O'Connor 2 (1tp), B O'Neill 2, C Scanlan, I Mannix 1 each	Report	Gls: E Browne, E Healy, C Sweeney 1 each Pts: D Lynch 7 (1tpf, 1tp), A Carey 3 (1f), D Keane 3, K O'Connor 1 (1'45), E Healy, P Walsh, JJ Grimes, S Tarrant 1 each	Referee: P Dowling (Ballylongford)

=== Final ===
22 November 2026
14:30 WET (UTC+0)
Final

Report

Duagh	1–09 (12) – (24) 1–21	Listowel Emmets
(HT: 0–04 - 0–08)
Gls: M Wren 1 Pts: C Dillon 3 (1tp, 1f), T Moloney, J Maher, K Lucey, N O'Connor, M Wren, C Buckley 1 each		Gls: A Kennelly 1 Pts: S Tarrant 8 (1tpf, 1tp, 1f), E Healy 4 (1tp), J McElligott 2 (1tp), D Lynch 2 (1f), D Keane 1 (1f), K O'Connor 1 (1'45), P Walsh, JJ Grimes, A Carey 1 each

O'Rahilly Park, Ballylongford
Referee: S Mulvihill (St. Senan's)

Source: Kerry GAA Fixtures/Results/Tables

== Roll of honour ==
=== By club ===
#	Team	Titles	Runners-Up	Winning years	Losing years
1	Listowel Emmets	19	11	1926, 1931, 1933, 1957, 1965, 1972, 1976, 1991, 1997, 1998, 2004, 2008, 2009, 2013, 2015, 2022, 2024, 2025, 2026	1927, 1928, 1946, 1962, 1985, 1992, 1995, 2005, 2006, 2010, 2014
2	Moyvane	18	14	1925, 1927, 1928, 1930, 1932, 1936, 1937, 1938, 1939, 1958, 1961, 1963, 1964, 1966, 1983, 1995, 1999, 2003	1926, 1940, 1941, 1942, 1960, 1971, 1978, 1979, 1981, 1984, 1987, 1989, 1990, 1996
3	Ballylongford	13	14	1940, 1941, 1943, 1947, 1953, 1968, 1970, 1971, 1974, 1975, 1986, 1993, 2000	1933, 1934, 1936, 1937, 1939, 1950, 1965, 1966, 1967, 1969, 1973, 1977, 1982, 1983
4	Ballydonoghue	10	7	1945, 1946, 1949, 1950, 1952, 1959, 1992, 2016, 2017, 2023	1944, 1951, 1953, 1961, 1994, 2018, 2020
5	Beale	8	4	1977, 1978, 1979, 1981, 1982, 1984, 1989, 2014	1988, 1997, 2011, 2012
6	Tarbert	7	13	1942, 1948, 1969, 1973, 1985, 1990, 2010	1930, 1931, 1932, 1938, 1954, 1958, 1959, 1964, 1970, 1974, 1975, 1976, 1999
7	Castleisland Desmonds	6	7	1980, 1988, 2002, 2007, 2020, 2021	1986, 1991, 2001, 2003, 2013, 2022, 2024
7	Duagh	6	6	1951, 1955, 1956, 1960, 1962, 2012	1947, 1949, 1952, 2002, 2008, 2026
9	Finuge	5	6	1967, 1987, 1996, 2001, 2011	1945, 1972, 1998, 2004, 2007, 2009
10	Ballyduff	3	6	1994, 2005, 2006	1948, 1963, 1968, 1993, 2017, 2021
11	St. Senan's	2	4	2018, 2019	1980, 2000, 2016, 2023
12	Clounmacon	1	2	1954	1955, 1957
12	Craughdarrig	1	0	1934	—
12	An tArm	1	0	1944	—
15	Brosna	0	2	—	2015, 2019
15	Faha	0	1	—	1925
15	Knocknagoshel	0	1	—	2025

== List of finals ==
Year	Winners		Runners-up		Venue
Year	Club	Score	Club	Score	Venue
2026	Listowel Emmets	1-21	Duagh	1-09	Ballylongford
2025	Listowel Emmets	(3-09) 2-18 (R)	Knocknagoshel	(1-15) 2-07 (R)	(Brosna), Ballylongford (R)
2024	Listowel Emmets	1-11	Castleisland Desmonds	0-08	Moyvane
2023	Ballydonoghue	2-06	St. Senan's	1-06	Ballyduff
2022	Listowel Emmets	0-13	Castleisland Desmonds	0-07	Ballylongford
2021	Castleisland Desmonds	(1-11) 3-14 (R)	Ballyduff	(1-11) 1-05 (R)	(Moyvane), Listowel (R)
2020	Castleisland Desmonds	1-14	Ballydonoghue	1-07	Brosna
2019	St. Senan's	2-06	Brosna	0-06	Ballylongford
2018	St. Senan's	1-12	Ballydonoghue	1-06	Moyvane
2017	Ballydonoghue	1-13	Ballyduff	1-04	Listowel
2016	Ballydonoghue	5-09	St. Senan's	0-08	Listowel
2015	Listowel Emmets	(0-09) 0-09 (R)	Brosna	(1-06) 0-06 (R)	(Moyvane), Ballybunion (R)
2014	Beale	0-11	Listowel Emmets	0-10	Ballylongford
2013	Listowel Emmets	1-08	Castleisland Desmonds	0-10	Tarbert
2012	Duagh	(0-07) 0-09 (R)	Beale	(1-04) 0-06 (R)	Listowel
2011	Finuge	1-09	Beale	0-11	Ballylongford
2010	Tarbert	(2-04) 2-12 (R)	Listowel Emmets	(1-07) 1-14 (R)	(Ballybunion), Moyvane (R)
2009	Listowel Emmets	0-12	Finuge	0-11	Ballybunion
2008	Listowel Emmets	0-10	Duagh	0-07	Moyvane
2007	Castleisland Desmonds	1-13	Finuge	1-06	Ballylongford
2006	Ballyduff	1-12	Listowel Emmets	0-14	Moyvane
2005	Ballyduff	2-06	Listowel Emmets	0-07	Moyvane
2004	Listowel Emmets	0-12	Finuge	0-05	Ballybunion
2003	Moyvane	0-10	Castleisland Desmonds	0-08	Ballylongford
2002	Castleisland Desmonds	0-10	Duagh	0-06	Ballybunion
2001	Finuge	1-09	Castleisland Desmonds	1-07	
2000	Ballylongford	4-09	St. Senan's	1-09	Tarbert
1999	Moyvane	0-10	Tarbert	0-06	Ballybunion
1998	Listowel Emmets	3-12	Finuge	2-08	Tarbert
1997	Listowel Emmets	1-09	Beale	0-09	Ballylongford
1996	Finuge	1-07 (R)	Moyvane	0-04 (R)	Listowel (R)
1995	Moyvane	1-11	Listowel Emmets	0-06	Finuge
1994	Ballyduff	0-05	Ballydonoghue	1-01	Ballybunion
1993	Ballylongford	1-08	Ballyduff	1-04	Ballybunion
1992	Ballydonoghue	0-08	Listowel Emmets	0-03	Ballybunion
1991	Listowel Emmets	0-09	Castleisland Desmonds	0-04	Ballybunion
1990	Tarbert	3-04	Moyvane	1-07	Finuge
1989	Beale	(2-03) 0-06 (R)	Moyvane	(1-06) 0-05 (R)	Ballylongford (R)
1988	Castleisland Desmonds	(1-07) 1-05 (R)	Beale	(1-07) 0-05 (R)	Listowel (R)
1987	Finuge	1-07	Moyvane	1-06	Ballybunion
1986	Ballylongford	0-09	Castleisland Desmonds	2-02	Listowel
1985	Tarbert	1-04	Listowel Emmets	0-04	Moyvane
1984	Beale	2-10	Moyvane	2-08	Tarbert
1983	Moyvane	0-08	Ballylongford	0-04	Ballybunion
1982	Beale	0-09	Ballylongford	1-05	Listowel
1981	Beale	2-11	Moyvane	2-10	Listowel
1980	Castleisland Desmonds	3-10	St. Senan's	1-04	Finuge
1979	Beale	4-08	Moyvane	2-03	Ballylongford
1978	Beale	1-09	Moyvane	0-07	Finuge
1977	Beale	1-11	Ballylongford	0-07	Ballylongford
1976	Listowel Emmets	2-09	Tarbert	0-09	Ballylongford
1975	Ballylongford	1-08	Tarbert	1-05	Listowel
1974	Ballylongford	2-05	Tarbert	1-07	Ballylongford
1973	Tarbert	3-07	Ballylongford	2-03	Ballylongford
1972	Listowel Emmets	1-07	Finuge	1-05	Ballylongford
1971	Ballylongford	0-13	Moyvane	2-01	Ballylongford
1970	Ballylongford	3-16	Tarbert	3-05	Moyvane
1969	Tarbert	1-07	Ballylongford	0-08	Listowel
1968	Ballylongford	2-12	Ballyduff	0-03	Listowel
1967	Finuge	1-08	Ballylongford	0-08	Listowel
1966	Moyvane	3-06	Ballylongford	1-05	Ballybunion
1965	Listowel Emmets	0-12	Ballylongford	1-08	Ballybunion
1964	Moyvane	1-10	Tarbert	0-05	Listowel
1963	Moyvane		Ballyduff		Listowel
1962	Duagh	0-07	Listowel Emmets	1-00	Listowel
1961	Moyvane		Ballydonoghue		Listowel
1960	Duagh	4-07	Moyvane	1-04	Ballybunion
1959	Ballydonoghue	3-06	Tarbert	1-02	Ballylongford
1958	Moyvane	2-03	Tarbert	0-06	Ballylongford
1957	Listowel Emmets	2-03	Clounmacon	0-06	Listowel
1956	Duagh^{1}	No final played			
1955	Duagh		Clounmacon		Ballybunion
1954	Clounmacon		Tarbert		Ballybunion
1953	Ballylongford	2-09	Ballydonoghue	0-02	
1952	Ballydonoghue^{2}	2-01	Duagh	0-07	
1951	Duagh	3-01	Ballydonoghue	0-01	Ballybunion
1950	Ballydonoghue	3-04	Ballylongford	2-05	Moyvane
1949	Ballydonoghue	2-05	Duagh	0-03	
1948	Tarbert	4-02	Ballyduff	1-04	
1947	Ballylongford	2-00	Duagh	1-02	Listowel
1946	Ballydonoghue	0-09	Listowel Emmets	1-05	Ballylongford
1945	Ballydonoghue	1-08	Finuge	0-02	Listowel
1944	An tArm (Fort Shannon)	1-06	Ballydonoghue	1-01	Ballylongford
1943	Ballylongford^{3}	Championship unfinished			
1942	Tarbert	5-03	Moyvane	1-03	Ballylongford
1941	Ballylongford	2-05	Moyvane	0-05	
1940	Ballylongford	0-03	Moyvane	0-02	
1939	Moyvane	2-05	Ballylongford	0-04	
1938	Moyvane	3-05	Tarbert	0-08	
1937	Moyvane		Ballylongford		
1936	Moyvane	3-04	Ballylongford	1-03	
1935	No Final played				
1934	Craughdarrig		Ballylongford		
1933	Listowel Emmets	2-08	Ballylongford	1-05	
1932	Moyvane (Newtownsandes)	2-08	Tarbert	0-03	
1931	Listowel Emmets	2-04	Tarbert	1-03	Moyvane
1930	Moyvane (Newtownsandes)	5-04	Tarbert	3-03	
1929	No Championship held				
1928	Moyvane (Newtownsandes)^{4}	2-03	Listowel Emmets	0-01	Moyvane
1927	Moyvane (Newtownsandes)	1-08	Listowel Emmets	1-01	
1926	Listowel Emmets	2-05	Moyvane (Newtownsandes)	0-03	
1925	Moyvane (Newtownsandes)	2-05	Faha	1-02	Listowel

=== Notes ===
^{1} Duagh awarded title as the only team to reach the final. The second semi-final was abandoned and never replayed.
^{2} Ballydonoghue awarded title without replay being played.
^{3} Championship unfinished, Ballylongford awarded title.
^{4} Match was semi-final but the last match to be played in Championship so Moyvane were awarded title.

== Records ==
=== Most titles (Team) ===
- 19 – Listowel Emmets

=== Most titles (Individual) ===
- 9 – Ger McCarthy (Listowel Emmets)

=== Most Consecutive titles ===
- 4 – Moyvane (1936-39)
- 3 – Moyvane (1927-30), Beale (1977-79), Listowel Emmets (2024-26)

=== Most Final appearances ===
- 32 – Moyvane
- 30 – Listowel Emmets
- 27 – Ballylongford

=== Biggest final winning margin ===
- 16 pts – Ballydonoghue v. St. Senan's, 2016

=== Longest gaps between titles ===
- 50 years – Duagh (1962 - 2012)
- 33 years – Ballydonoghue (1959 - 1992)
- 25 years – Beale (1989 - 2014)
- 24 years – Listowel Emmets (1933 - 1957), Ballydonoghue (1992 - 2016)
- 21 years – Tarbert (1948 - 1969)
- 20 years – Finuge (1967 - 1987), Tarbert (1990 - 2010)

=== Longest time since last title (Current Championship teams) ===
- 26 years – Ballylongford (last title in 2000)
- 23 years – Moyvane (last title in 2003)
- 20 years – Ballyduff (last title in 2006)

== See also ==
- Kerry Senior Football Championship
- Divisional Championships:
  - East Kerry Senior Football Championship
  - Mid Kerry Senior Football Championship
  - West Kerry Senior Football Championship
- North Kerry GAA
