= 1989 Kerry Senior Football Championship =

Gaelic football competition

- Dates: 24 June - 24 September 1989
- Teams: 19
- Sponsor: Allied Irish Bank
- Champions: Laune Rangers (7th title); Peter Lyons (captain); Noel O'Mahony (manager)
- Runners-up: John Mitchels; John Joe Sheehy (captain); Denis Fitzgerald (manager)

Tournament statistics
- Matches played: 19
- Goals scored: 38 (2 per match)
- Points scored: 332 (17.47 per match)
- Top scorer(s): Martin Dennehy (0-22)

The 1989 Kerry Senior Football Championship was the 89th staging of the Kerry Senior Football Championship since its establishment by the Kerry County Board in 1889. The championship ran from 24 June to 24 September 1989. It was the first championship to be sponsored after Allied Irish Bank took over the role.

Kenmare entered the championship as the defending champions, however, they were beaten by Laune Rangers in the quarter-finals.

The final was played on 24 September 1989 at FitzGerald Stadium in Killarney, between Laune Rangers and John Mitchels, in what was their first ever meeting in the final. Laune Rangers won the match by 2-13 to 1-06 to claim their seventh championship title overall and a first title in 78 years. They also became the first holders of the newly-commissioned Bishop Moynihan Cup.

Martin Dennehy was the championship's top scorer with 0-22.

== Results ==
=== Preliminary round ===
25 June 1989 Preliminary round	East Kerry	1-06 - 0-10	Shannon Rangers	Kilcummin Grounds
	D O'Leary 1-0, B O'Donoghue 0-2, J Cahillane 0-2, M O'Shea 0-1, D O'Connor 0-1.		Sullivan 0-4, S Stack 0-2, J Doolan 0-1, J Holmes 0-1, K Culhane 0-1, A Doyle 0-1.

25 June 1989 Preliminary round	Castleisland Desmonds	0-10 - 3-07	Dr. Crokes	Castleisland Grounds
	C Kearney 0-5, D Murphy 0-2, M Downey 0-2, W O'Connor 0-1.		P O'Shea 1-1, T O'Shea 1-0, L Hartnett 1-0, A O'Shea 0-3, G O'Shea 0-1, M Buckley 0-1, M Burns 0-1.

2 July 1989 Preliminary round	Kerins O'Rahilly's	3-08 - 0-09	Mid Kerry	Strand Road
	M Clifford 1-4, N O'Sullivan 1-1, N O'Mahony 1-0, D Burke 0-1, M Nix 0-1, D Keane 0-1.		W Maher 0-5, T Evans 0-2, E O'Shea 0-1, G O'Connor 0-1.

=== First round ===
24 June 1989 First round	Valentia	2-04 - 3-10	Beale	Con Keating Park
	G O'Driscoll 1-2, MA O'Connell 1-0, F Murphy 0-1, M O'Donoghue 0-1.		E Liston 1-3, P Guerin 1-1, D Moran 0-4, D Dowling 1-0, T Murphy 0-1, S Liston 0-1.

25 June 1989 First round	Laune Rangers	0-12 - 0-07	Killarney	J. P. O'Sullivan
	T Fleming 0-5, G Murphy 0-5, P Griffin 0-2.		M McAuliffe 0-3, F Doherty 0-1, D Kennedy 0-1, J Griffin 0-1, M Cronin 0-1.

25 June 1989 First round	Kenmare	2-12 - 0-04	St. Brendan's	Fr. Breen Park
	K Rice 1-3, P Spillane 1-1, S O'Shea 0-2, E McCarthy 0-2, A O'Connor 0-2, P McCarthy 0-2.		S Murphy 0-4.

25 June 1989 First round	St. Kieran's	1-07 - 0-09	South Kerry	Currow Grounds
	S McElligott 1-3, T Brosnan 0-3, F Casey 0-1.		M Fitzgerald 0-4, F Sullivan 0-1, S Fitzgerald 0-1, D Clifford 0-1, R O'Dwyer 0-1, G O'Sullivan 0-1.

25 June 1989 First round	Feale Rangers	1-06 - 1-12	John Mitchels	Moyvane Grounds
	D Walsh 1-0, D McElligott 0-2, J Horgan 0-2, JP O'Connell 0-1, S Carrig 0-1.		M Dennehy 0-7, J Hegarty 1-1, J O'Dowd 0-1, K Kelliher 0-1, D McEvoy 0-1, N Kelliher 0-1.

8 July 1989 First round	Shannon Rangers	0-09 - 0-13	West Kerry	Ballylongford Grounds
	J O'Sullivan 0-3, J Stack 0-2, S Stack 0-1, K Culhane 0-1, J Kennedy 0-1, J Dowling 0-1.		J Hannafin 0-6, S Geaney 0-3, T O'Connor 0-2, M Moriarty 0-1, F Ashe 0-1.

8 July 1989 First round	Austin Stacks	0-08 - 0-06	Kerins O'Rahilly's	Austin Stack Park
	E Moynihan 0-3, JL McElligott 0-2, J Fitzmaurice 0-1, D Aherne 0-1, K Browne 0-1.		M Nix 0-3, N O'Sullivan 0-1, M Clifford 0-1, M Keane 0-1.

8 July 1989 First round	Dr Crokes	1-11 - 2-08	Gneeveguilla	FitzGerald Stadium
	A O'Shea 0-5, P O'Shea 1-0, G O'Shea 0-3, N O'Leary 0-1, C Murphy 0-1, C Galvin 0-1.		G Looney 1-1, P Cremin 1-0, J Brosnan 0-2, A Looney 0-2, A O'Donovan 0-2, J Murphy 0-1.

30 July 1989 First round replay	Gneeveguilla	0-12 - 0-07	Dr Crokes	Gneeveguilla Grounds
	M Finnegan 0-5, A Looney 0-2, J Murphy 0-2, S Óg O'Leary 0-1, P O'Sullivan 0-1, A O'Donovan 0-1.		G O'Shea 0-2, C Murphy 0-2, T O'Shea 0-1, C Galvin 0-1, A O'Shea 0-1.

=== Quarter-finals ===
29 July 1989 Quarter-final	Kenmare	1-07 - 1-08	John Mitchels	Fr. Breen Park
	E McCarthy 1-1, P Spillane 0-3, T Spillane 0-1, T Harrington 0-1, A O'Connor 0-1.		M Dennehy 0-7, JJ Sheehy 1-1.

30 July 1989 Quarter-final	West Kerry	0-12 - 4-09	Austin Stacks	Páirc an Aghasaigh
	J Hannafin 0-7, M Moriarty 0-2, G Casey 0-1, D Farrell 0-1, S Geaney 0-1.		E Moynihan 1-4, D Aherne 1-2, R O'Lehan 1-0, G Power 1-0, JL McElligott 0-2, L Kearns 0-1.

30 July 1989 Quarter-final	St. Kieran's	1-04 - 0-13	Laune Rangers	Currow Grounds
	S McElligott 1-1, T Hickey 0-2, M Galwey 0-1.		T Fleming 0-5, G Murphy 0-3, B O'Sullivan 0-2, J O'Shea 0-1, P Griffin 0-1, J Sheehan 0-1.

5 August 1989 Quarter-final	Beale	4-10 - 2-05	Gneeveguilla	Ballybunion Grounds
	E Liston 1-4, G Costello 1-1, L Guerin 1-1, P Guerin 1-1, O Moran 0-2, T Murphy 0-1.		A O'Donovan 1-2, J Murphy 1-0, A Looney 0-2, P Crimmin 0-1.

=== Semi-finals ===
26 August 1989 Semi-final	John Mitchels	0-12 - 1-07	Beale	Austin Stack Park
	M Dennehy 0-8, D McEvoy 0-2, J O'Dowd 0-1, R O'Dowd 0-1.		O Moran 0-5, L Guerin 1-0, E Liston 0-1, K Boyle 0-1.

27 August 1989 Semi-final	Laune Rangers	1-09 - 0-10	Austin Stacks	Austin Stack Park
	B O'Sullivan 1-1, T Fleming 0-3, G Murphy 0-2, J O'Shea 0-2, P Prendeville 0-1.		JL McElligott 0-4, E Moynihan 0-2, D Aherne 0-2, G Power 0-1, L Liddy 0-1.

=== Final ===
24 September 1989 Final	Laune Rangers	2-13 - 1-06	John Mitchels	FitzGerald Stadium
	P McKenna 1-2, G Murphy 0-5, T Fleming 0-4, B O'Sullivan 1-0, P Griffin 0-2.		N Kelliher 1-1, J Sheehy 0-4, J Hegarty 0-1.	Referee: D Moynihan (Killarney Legion)

== Championship statistics ==
=== Top scorers ===
Overall

Rank	Player	Club	Tally	Total	Matches	Average
1	Martin Dennehy	John Mitchels	0-22	22	4	5.50
2	Timmy Fleming	Laune Rangers	0-17	17	4	4.25
3	Gerard Murphy	Laune Rangers	0-15	15	4	3.75
4	Eoin Liston	Beale	2-08	14	3	4.66
5	James Hannafin	West Kerry	0-13	13	2	6.50
6	Eoin Moynihan	Austin Stacks	1-09	12	3	4.00
7	Ogie Moran	Beale	0-11	11	3	3.66
8	Seán McElligott	St. Kieran's	2-04	10	2	5.00
9	Billy O'Sullivan	Laune Rangers	2-03	9	4	2.25
10	Aidan O'Shea	Dr. Crokes	0-09	9	3	3.00

In a single game

Rank	Player	Club	Tally	Total	Opposition
1	Martin Dennehy	John Mitchels	0-08	8	Beale
2	Eoin Moynihan	Austin Stacks	1-04	7	West Kerry
2	Eoin Liston	Beale	1-04	7	Gneeveguilla
2	Michael Clifford	Kerins O'Rahilly's	1-04	7	Mid Kerry
2	Martin Dennehy	John Mitchels	0-07	7	Feale Rangers
2	Martin Dennehy	John Mitchels	0-07	7	Kenmare
2	James Hannafin	West Kerry	0-07	7	Austin Stacks
8	Eoin Liston	Beale	1-03	6	Valentia
8	Kevin Rice	Kenmare	1-03	6	St. Brendan's
8	Seán McElligott	St. Kieran's	1-03	6	South Kerry
8	James Hannafin	West Kerry	0-06	6	Shannon Rangers

=== Miscellaneous ===
- Laune Rangers won the title for the first time in 78 years.
- Laune Rangers qualified for the final for the first time since 1911.
- John Mitchels qualified for the final for the first time since 1966.
- Laune Rangers were the first winners of the newly-commissioned Bishop Moynihan Cup.
- Laune Rangers 78-year gap between titles remains the longest gap between successive championship titles.
