= Tarbert GAA =

Gaelic games club in County Kerry, Ireland

- Tairbeart
- Founded: 1899
- County: Kerry
- Colours: Red and black
- Grounds: Shannon Park, Tarbert, County Kerry
- Coordinates: 52°34′17″N 9°22′23″W

Playing kits
Standard colours

Tarbert GAA is a Gaelic Athletic Association club in Tarbert, County Kerry, Ireland. The club fields Gaelic football teams in the Kerry Junior Championship, Div 2 County League and Div 1 North Kerry Championship.

== History ==
The club was founded in July 1899. Since its foundation, Tarbert had a rivalry with Ballylongford GAA, extending into the twentieth century. The history of the club, including its record in under age competitions, is recorded in a book titled Tarbert G.A.A. A Century of the Red and Black which was compiled by Tarbert Bord Na nÓg. The club won the 2010 North Kerry Senior Football Championship in a replay against Listowel Emmets. In 2025, after losing back-to-back finals in 2023 and 2024, the club finally secured a further Kerry Junior Football Championship with a 1 point victory over Beale.

== Notable players ==
- Shane Enright - All-Ireland Under 21 & Senior winning. 2015 All-Star winner

== Roll of honour ==
- North Kerry Senior Football Championship: (7) 1942, 1948, 1969, 1973, 1985, 1990, 2010
- Kerry Intermediate Football Championship: (1) 1977
- Kerry Junior Football Championship: (3) 1930, 1995, 2025
