= Clounmacon GAA =

Gaelic football team in County Kerry, Ireland

Clounmacon
- Cluain Meacan
- Founded: 1898
- County: Kerry
- Colours: Black & Amber
- Grounds: Pairc na nGael coordinates = 52°28′55.21″N 9°25′26.25″W

Playing kits
Standard colours

Clounmacon are a Gaelic football team in north County Kerry in Ireland. They play in Division 5 of the county league. Clounmacon players also participate in the Kerry Senior Football Championship with the divisional side Feale Rangers.

== History ==
The club was founded in 1898. Clounmacon played Ballylongford on 29 October in their first game. The final score was Clounmacon 0–6, Ballylongford 1–2. The club won its only North Kerry Senior Football Championship in 1954 when they beat Tarbert in the final, they made the finals in 1955 and 1957 but lost to Duagh and Listowel Emmets.

== Honours ==
- North Kerry Senior Football Championship 1: 1954
