= Seán Burke (Gaelic footballer) =

Irish Gaelic football player

Personal information
- Native name: Seán de Búrca (Irish)
- Born: 1969 (age 56–57) Milltown, County Kerry

Sport
- Sport: Gaelic football
- Position: Right wing-back
Club
- Years: Club
- 1980s–2000s: Milltown/Castlemaine
Club titles
- Kerry titles: 1
Inter-county
Years	County	Apps (scores)
1990–1997	Kerry	17
Inter-county titles
- Munster titles: 2
- All-Irelands: 0
- NFL: 0
- All Stars: 0

Seán Burke (born 1969) is an Irish former sportsperson. He played Gaelic football with his local club Milltown/Castlemaine and Cork side Bishopstown and was a member of the Kerry senior inter-county team between 1990 and 1997.

== Club ==
At club level he played with Milltown/Castlemaine and Mid Kerry, while also later playing with Bishopstown in Cork.

With Milltown/Castlemaine he won a Kerry Junior Football Championship in 1990, two Kerry Intermediate Football Championship titles in 1991 and 1994.

With Mid Kerry he won a Kerry Senior Football Championship in 1992.

== Underage ==
Burke played with the Kerry Under 21 team in 1990. He was full back in all of Kerry's games as they overcame Cork to win the Munster title and Tyrone to win the All-Ireland title.

== Junior ==
In 1990 he also lined out with the Kerry junior team. However, he had little success at this grade.

== Senior ==
He first joined the Kerry senior team during the 1989/90 National Football League, playing in all seven of his side's games. His only championship appearance was the Munster final loss to Cork The Kingdom losing out 2-23 to 1-11, in one of Kerry's biggest ever championship losses.

For the 1990/91 National League he again played in every game as Kerry lost out to Kildare in the quarter-final in Croke Park. He was a regular in the championship as wins over Clare, Cork and Limerick seen a first Munster title for Kerry since 1986, and a first for Burke. Burke and Kerry's season came to an end after losing out to Down in the All-Ireland semi-final.

He only played in three of Kerry's 1991/92 National League games. He was back as a regular come championship time. Wins over Cork and Limerick seen Kerry back in the Munster final where they faced Clare. In one of the all-time great championship shocks, Clare won a first Munster title since 1917.

Burke was now one of Kerry's man players. He lined out at centre back for all nine of Kerry's National League games in 1992/93 as Kerry lost out to Dublin in the semi-final. Kerry's championship was short-lived as they lost out to Cork in the Munster semi-final, this being the sides only championship game of the season.

Burke missed the start of the 1993/94 National League but plays in the final six games as Kerry lost out to Down in the knockout stages. Despite overcoming Limerick, Kerry again lost out to Cork in the Munster semi final.

He again played in all of Kerry's League games in the 1994/95 season. Again falling short in the knockout stages, this time to Tyrone. He missed out on the Munster first-round win over Limerick, but was back in the team for the semi-final win over Tipperary. This set up a Munster final with Cork. However, for the third year in a row, Cork had the upper hand and took the title.

He played in all of Kerry's League games once more in the 1995/96 season. Kerry again losing out in the knockout stages, this time to Cork. He played in the Munster championship win over Tipperary, but missed the semi-final win over Waterford. He was back in the team at centre back for the Munster final clash with Cork. Having lost to their great foes for the three seasons before, Kerry finally got over the line to win a first Munster title since 1991 and a second medal for Burke. He played in the All-Ireland semi-final, and despite scoring a goal, loss to Mayo in Croke Park latter in the summer.

He played no part in the 1996/97 League, nor did he play during the successful Munster campaign. He did, however, play Right Corner Back in the semi-final win over Cavan, to pick up his first and only championship win in Croke Park.

He was part of the panel that won Kerry's first All Ireland title in 11 years after overcoming Mayo in the final, he did not play in the final, however.

He played in five of Kerry's 1997/98 League but not in the championship, there were to be his last games at senior level with Kerry.

Sporting positions
Preceded by Connie Murphy	Kerry Senior Football Captain; 1993	Succeeded by Timmy Fleming
