= Paddy Kelly (Kerry footballer) =

Irish Gaelic footballer

Personal information
- Born: County Kerry

Sport
- Sport: Gaelic football
- Position: Midfeald
Club
- Years: Club
- 2000's: Ballylongford John Mitchels Listowel Emmets
Inter-county
Years	County	Apps (scores)
2004-2005	Kerry	5 (0-01)
Inter-county titles
- Munster titles: 2
- All-Irelands: 1
- NFL: 0
- All Stars: 0

Paddy Kelly is a footballer from County Kerry. He won an All-Ireland Medal with Kerry in 2004, and also won a Munster Minor Championship in 2001. He played club football with a number of different clubs, specifically Ballylongford, John Mitchels and Listowel Emmets.

== Underage ==
Kelly first played with Kerry at minor level in 2001. Wins over Waterford and Cork allowed Kelly to pick up a Munster medal. Kerry later lost to Dublin in the All-Ireland semi-final.

He later linked up with the Kerry Under 21 team. In 2002 he was Right Half Forward as Kerry overcame Clare in the Munster final. They later lost to Galway in the All-Ireland semi-final.

He was a regular again in 2003. Wins over Limerick and Tipperary saw Kelly line out in a second Munster final with Waterford. Kerry were expected to win a second title in a row, however Waterford socked Kelly and co on a 2–08 to 1–09 scoreline.

He lined out with the Under 21 team for a third and final year in 2004. Wins over Clare and Waterford saw Kelly line out in his third Munster final in row. However Kerry came up short against Cork in his last game in the grade.

== Senior ==
Kelly was a surprise choose for Kerry's 2004 All-Ireland Senior Football Championship quarter-final with Dublin at Midfield. He appeared as a sub and scored a point in the semi-final win over Derry. He again appeared as Kerry overcame Mayo to take the All-Ireland title on a 1–20 to 2–09 scoreline.
