= Shane Enright =

Kerry Gaelic footballer

Personal information
- Native name: Seán Mac Ionnrachtaigh (Irish)
- Born: 12 June 1988 (age 38) Tralee, Ireland
- Occupation: Bank Official
- Height: 1.83 m (6 ft 0 in)

Sport
- Sport: Gaelic football
- Position: Left Corner Back
Club
- Years: Club
- 2005–: Tarbert
Inter-county
Years	County	Apps (scores)
2011–2020	Kerry	95 (0–6)
Inter-county titles
- Munster titles: 8
- All-Irelands: 1
- NFL: 2
- All Stars: 1

Shane Enright (born 12 June 1988 in Tralee) is an Irish Gaelic footballer who plays for his local club Tarbert and, formerly, for the Kerry county team from 2011 to 2020.

He played for the Kerry minor team in 2005 and 2006. In 2006, he won a Munster Minor Championship before losing to Roscommon in the All-Ireland Minor final after a replay. He then moved to the Under 21 team from 2007 to 2009. He had little success in 2007, Kerry being beaten by Clare in the first round. In 2008, Kerry won their first Munster Championship since 2002 and beat Kildare to win their first All Ireland Under 21 title since 1998. In 2009, Kerry suffered a heavy loss to Cork in the first round of the Munster Championship. He played centre back for the Tarbert team that won the 2010 North Kerry Championship. He first played senior inter-county in 2011, helping Kerry to the Munster Championship.

He works for the Bank of Ireland.
