= Brendan Lane (Gaelic footballer) =

Kerry Gaelic football goalkeeper

Personal information
- Born: County Kerry, Ireland

Sport
- Sport: Gaelic football
- Position: Goalkeeper
Club
- Years: Club
- 198?-: Brosna
Club titles
- Kerry titles: 1
- Munster titles: 0
- All-Ireland Titles: 0
Inter-county
Years	County	Apps (scores)
1994	Kerry	1 (0–0)
Inter-county titles
- Munster titles: 0
- All-Irelands: 0
- All Stars: 0

Brendan Lane was a Gaelic football goalkeeper from County Kerry, Ireland. He played with his local Brosna club and at senior level for the Kerry county team. He played one game for the Kerry senior team in the first round of the 1994 Munster Championship.

At club level with St Kieran's he won a Kerry Senior Football Championship in 1988. He also won a Novice Football Championship with Brosna in 1984 and was still a player-manager when they made the final in 2009 and was still part of the team that won the title in 2011. He also won a County Junior Championship in 1989.
