= Ballybunion Golf Club =

Golf club in County Kerry, Ireland

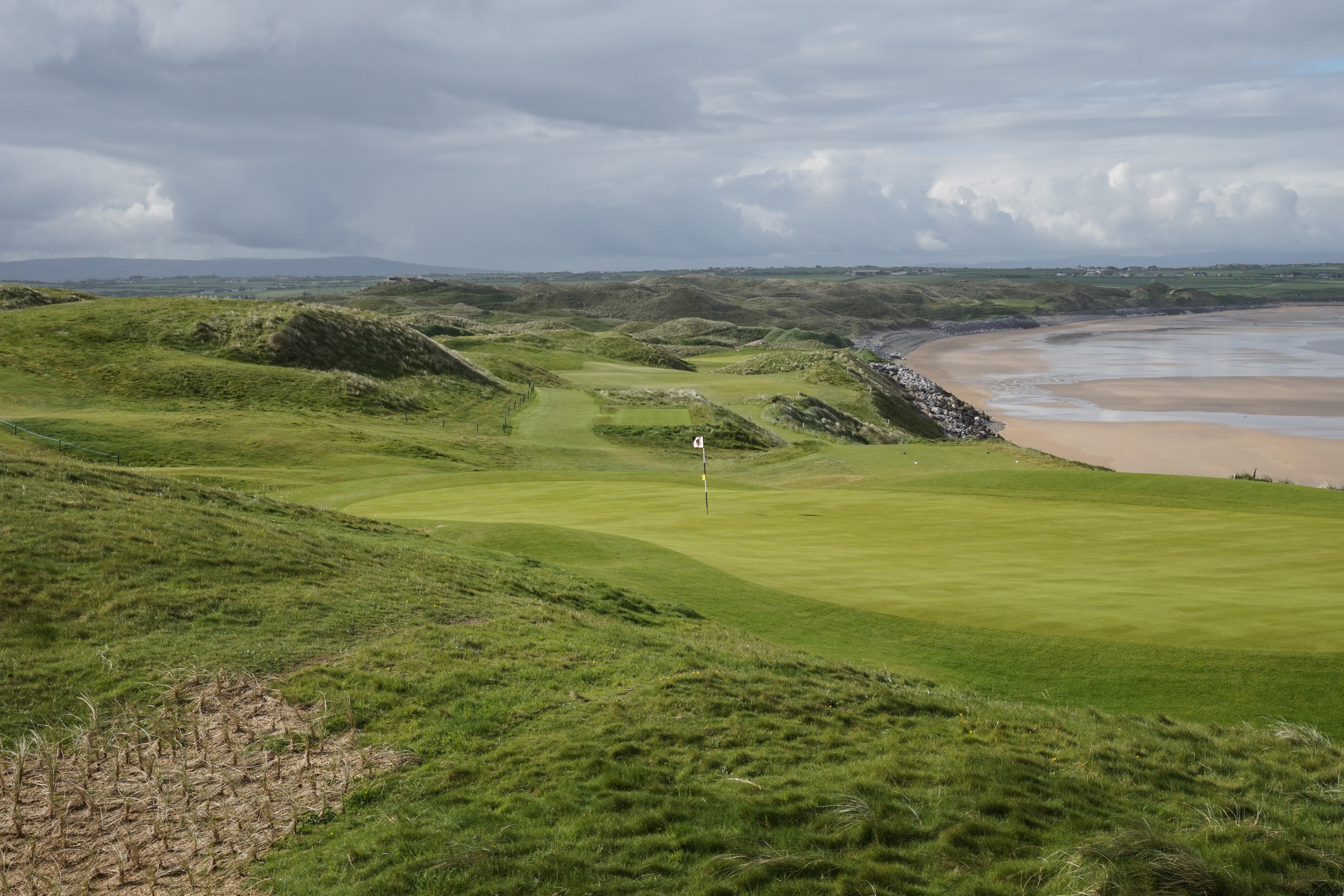
- 10th hole of the Old Course

- Location in southwest Ireland
- 52.495°N 9.676°W

Club information
- Location: Ballybunion, County Kerry, Ireland
- Established: 1893, 133 years ago
- Type: Private
- Tota holes: 36
- Tournaments: Irish Open (2000) Palmer Cup (2004)
- Website: ballybuniongolfclub.ie/

Old Course
- Designed by: Lionel Hewson (1893), Tom Simpson and Molly Gourlay (1930)
- Par: 71
- Length: 6,802 yards (6,220 m) Longest hole is #5, 560 yards (512 m)
- Course rating: 72

Cashen Course
- Designed by: Robert Trent Jones, Sr.
- Par: 72
- Length: 6,318 yards (5,777 m) Longest hole is #8, 605 yards (553 m)
- Course rating: 73

Ballybunion Golf Club is a golf club in County Kerry, Ireland. The club is located south of Ballybunion, on Sandhill Road. Comprising two links courses, Ballybunion was previously ranked at number seven in Golf Digest's "100 Best Courses Outside the USA". While, due to its remote location, the course has not been selected for many top championship events, the club's "Old Course" hosted the Irish Open on the European Tour in 2000.

== History ==
Founded in 1893, the club had barely opened its doors before experiencing financial problems. An investment in the early 20th century saved the club and nine new holes were laid out. By 1927, the course had been expanded to 18 holes.

A number of the world's top players have played at the course, including Tom Watson who first visited Ballybunion in 1981. In 1995, Watson remodeled Ballybunion into the course that exists today.

During his second term, U.S. President Bill Clinton played the course in September 1998. A statue of him with a golf club in the town of Ballybunion commemorates the visit. After leaving office, he returned in May 2001.

The club hosted the Murphy's Irish Open in 2000 and the Palmer Cup in 2004.

== Courses ==
Ballybunion has two courses: The Old Course and The Cashen Course;

- The Old Course has a length of 6,802 yards (6,220 m) (Blue Tees) and 6,350 yards (White Tees). Ladies Tees are 5,459 yards. Par: 71 Men / 74 Ladies.
- The Cashen Course has a length of 6,306 yards (5,766 m) yards (Blue Tees) and 5,997 (White Tees); Ladies Tees are 5,031 yards. Par: 72 Men & Ladies. Course Designer: Robert Trent Jones, Sr. in 1984.
