= Brosna GAA (Kerry) =

North Kerry Gaelic football team in County Kerry, Ireland

- CLG Brosnach
- Founded: 1970s
- County: Kerry
- Colours
- Grounds: Páirc na Féile
- Coordinates: 52°18′40″N 9°15′38″W

Playing kits
First kit	Second kit

Brosna GAA is a Gaelic football club based in the village of Brosna in the Sliabh Luachra region of County Kerry. The club fields teams at all age levels and also both men's and women's senior teams. The club is affiliated to the North Kerry Football Board and is a member club of the St. Kieran's divisional team that competes annually in the Kerry Senior Football Championship.

The club also competes in the North Kerry Senior Football Championship and since 2016 in the Kerry Premier Junior Football Championship.

== History ==
Although a GAA club was formed in Brosna in 1888, it wasn't until the 1970s that the current club was formed. They joined the North Kerry Football Board in 1975 and won their first title in 1977 (North Kerry Junior Championship). In 1985 the club won the Kerry Novice Football Championship and four Brosna players were part of the St. Kieran's team that won the 1988 Kerry Senior Football Championship. Further success followed in 1989 when the club won the Kerry Junior Football Championship defeating neighbours Knocknagoshel in the final.

In 1996 the then GAA President elect Joe McDonagh officially opened the club's new facility - Páirc na Féile (Feale Park). The club's first North Kerry League title was won in 2010 and the following year they won their second Kerry Novice title and added the Munster Novice title by defeating Blackrock of Cork in the final. A second Kerry Junior title was won in 2014 with the club also winning the Munster Junior Club title and then adding the All-Ireland Junior Club title the following spring. Before the year's end Brosna reached their first ever North Kerry Senior Football Championship final, but lost to Listowel Emmets after a replay. They reached the final again in 2019 but were defeated again.

== Honours ==
- All-Ireland Junior Club Football Championship (1): 2015
- Munster Junior Club Football Championship (1): 2014
- Kerry Junior Football Championship (2): 1989, 2014
- Munster Novice Club Football Championship (1): 2011
- Kerry Novice Football Championship (2): 1985, 2011
- North Kerry League (1): 2010

== Notable players ==
- Brendan Lane
