= St Senan's GAA (Kerry) =

Gaelic Athletic Association Gaelic football club in County Kerry, Ireland

St Senan's
- Naomh Seanáin
- Founded: 1934
- County: Kerry
- Colours: Blue and yellow
- Grounds: Jackie Finnerty Park
- Coordinates: 52°23′47.81″N 9°30′52.86″W

Playing kits
Standard colours

St Senan's are a Gaelic Athletic Association Gaelic football club from just outside Listowel in north County Kerry, Ireland. They play North Kerry Division 1, County League Division 3 and Premier Junior Championship Football. They won the Kerry Junior Football Championship in 1985 and 1996. St Senan's won the North Kerry Senior Football Championship for the first time in 2018 and retained the title in 2019.

== History ==
St Senan's won the North Kerry Senior Football Championship for the first time in the club's history after defeating the reigning champions Ballydonoghue in Con Brosnan Park, Moyvane on 9 December 2018. The club successfully prevented Ballydonoghue from winning three consecutive titles, a feat not achieved in over 40 years within the district. Not only did St Senan's win the championship, but they also won Division 1 of the North Kerry League beating Brosna after extra time.

== Achievements ==
- Kerry Junior Football Championship (2): 1985, 1996 Runner-up 1994
- Kerry Premier Junior Football Championship Runner-up 2019, 2025
- Kerry Novice Football Championship (2): 1984, 2015
- North Kerry Senior Football Championship (2): 2018, 2019 (runners-up in 1980, 2000, 2016)
