= Pa Laide =

Kerry Gaelic footballer

Personal information
- Born: 1971 or 1972 (age 54–55) Tralee, County Kerry
- Height: 5 ft 11 in (180 cm)

Sport
- Sport: Gaelic football
- Position: Half Forward
Club
- Years: Club
- 1980s–2000s: Austin Stacks
Club titles
- Kerry titles: 1
- Munster titles: 0
- All-Ireland Titles: 0
Inter-county
Years	County	Apps (scores)
1990–1998	Kerry	14 (2–14)
Inter-county titles
- Munster titles: 3
- All-Irelands: 1
- NFL: 1
- All Stars: 1

Pa Laide (born 1971/1972) is a former Gaelic footballer who played for the Austin Stacks club and at senior level for the Kerry county team in the late 1980s till the late 1990s.

== Personal life ==
Laide is from Tralee in County Kerry, Ireland.

He has served as CEO of Cara Credit Union, a role he had as of 2017. He previously worked with Allied Irish Banks.

His father Mick played with Galway in the 1959 All-Ireland Senior Football Championship Final loss to his native Kerry.

== Club ==
Laide lined out at club level with the Austin Stacks club in Tralee. His biggest success was a Kerry Senior Football Championship in 1994. He again lined out in a Kerry Senior Football Championship final but was on the losing side in 2001. He also won a Kerry County Football League – Division 1 title in 1990 and a Kerry Club Football Championship title in 2003.

== Underage ==
Minor

Laide played with the Kerry minor team in 1988. He was at Left Half Forward in wins over Limerick scoring 0-03, Waterford scoring 0-04 and the final against Cork scoring 1-01 as he pick up a Munster Minor Football Championship title. He went on to score 0-02 in the All-Ireland semi-final win over Tyrone. He score 0-01 in a low scoring final win over Dublin to give him an All-Ireland Minor Football Championship title.

He was underage again in 1989 but only played in the Munster semi-final win over Waterford.

Under 21

He joined the Kerry Under 21 team in 1990. He was at Left Half Forward in wins over Limerick scoring 0-02, Clare scoring 0-03 and the final against Cork he picked up a Munster Under-21 Football Championship title. He went on to score 0-01 in the All-Ireland semi-final win over Galway. Laide scored a goal in a 5-12 to 2-11 win over Tyrone. This seen him pick up an All-Ireland Under-21 Football Championship title.

He was again part of the Under 21 team in 1991. His first appearance being in the Munster final against Cork. He scored 0-01 as picked up a second Under 21 title. His 0-02 in the All-Ireland semi-final against Meath proved to be key as Kerry won out 2-07 to 1-06. Kerry faced Tyrone in a repeat of the 1990 final. However things didn't go to plan as the Kerrymen lost out on a 4-16 to 1-05 scoreline.

He was underage for a third season in 1992. Wins over Limerick, Waterford and Cork seen Laide win his third Munster Under 21 title. For the third year in a row Laide faced Tyrone, this time in the All-Ireland semi-final. Despite his best efforts, scoring 0-03, Kerry ended up on the losing side on a 1-13 to 1-08 scoreline.

== Junior ==
Having struggled to hold down a place in the senior team, for a number of reasons, he lined out with the Kerry Junior team. His single appearance being as a sub in a Munster Quarter Final win over Tipperary.

== Senior ==
His first appearances at senior level came during the second half of the 1989–90 National Football League when he lined out against Dublin, Cavan and Cork.

He made his championship debut against Clare later that summer. He lined out in his first Munster Senior Football Championship final against Cork. However it was a day to forget as Kerry suffered one of the biggest championship losses, going down on a 2-23 to 1-11 scoreline.

He made three appearances during the 1990–91 National Football League against Armagh. Roscommon and Kildare. He played no part in the subsequent championship.

He played in all six of Kerry's 1991–92 National Football League. He returned to championship football lining out in wins over Cork and Limerick. He was dropped for the Munster final with Clare. Despite being overwhelming favorites to take the title Clare caused one of the all time shocks as they took the title on a 2-10 to 0-12 scoreline.

He missed the whole 1992–93 National Football League and the subsequent championship.

He returned during the 1993–94 National Football League playing in seven games. He marked his return to championship football with 1-02 in a 2-19 to 0-08 win over Limerick in the Munster quarterfinal . He lined out in Munster semi-final when Kerry faced Cork. Laide was on the losing side as Kerry failed for the second season in a row to qualify for the Munster final.

He played in two games during the 1994–95 National Football League. He would after this enter into the wildness for the next number of years.

After a few season away Laide returned to the side during the 1996–97 National Football League. He played in all bar one game, including the final win over Cork. He made his first Munster Championship appearance since 1994 when he lined out in a semi-final was over Tipperary seen Kerry qualify for the final where they faced Clare. Laide had lined out in the 1992 Munster final when Clare socked his side, however this time there was no such surprise as Laide put in a Man of the Match display with 1-02 and picked up his first Munster Senior Football Championship title after a 1-17 to 1-10 scoreline. A win over Cavan in the All-Ireland semi-final seen Kerry qualify for a first All-Ireland final since 1986 in what was his first All-Ireland championship game in Croke Park. In the final Laide lined out at Left Half Forward against Mayo. A masterclass from Maurice Fitzgerald seen Kerry take the title on a 0-13 to 1-07 scoreline. Laide helped himself to 0-02 on the way to picking up his first All-Ireland senior medal. To cap off an already successful season he was awarded with an All-Star at the end of the year.

After an indifferent 1997–98 National Football League Laide and co qualified for another Munster final after a semi-final win over Cork. In the final Kerry faced Tipperary with 0-02 from Laide helping his side and him to another second Munster title in a row after a 0-17 to 1-10 win. In the All-Ireland semi-final Kerry faced surprise Linster champions Kildare. Kildare had already seen off two of the last three All-Ireland winners on route to the semi-final and despite being underdogs the Kerrymen fell to a 0-13 to 1-09 loss. It would be Laides final championship appearance.

He appeared in the first two rounds of the 1998–99 National Football League against Roscommon and Louth. Despite being still in his late 20s those would be his last games with Kerry.

== Honours ==
Austin Stacks

- Kerry Senior Football Championship (1) 1994
- Kerry Club Football Championship (1) 2003
- Kerry County Football League – Division 1 (1) 1990

Kerry

- Munster Minor Football Championship (1) 1988
- All-Ireland Minor Football Championship (1) 1988
- Munster Under-21 Football Championship (3) 1990, 1991, 1992
- All-Ireland Under-21 Football Championship (1) 1990
- Munster Senior Football Championship (2) 1997, 1998
- All-Ireland Senior Football Championship (1) 1997
- National Football League (1) 1996/97
