= Ballybunion =

Seaside resort in County Kerry, Ireland

Ballybunion Baile an Bhuinneánaigh (Irish)
- Town
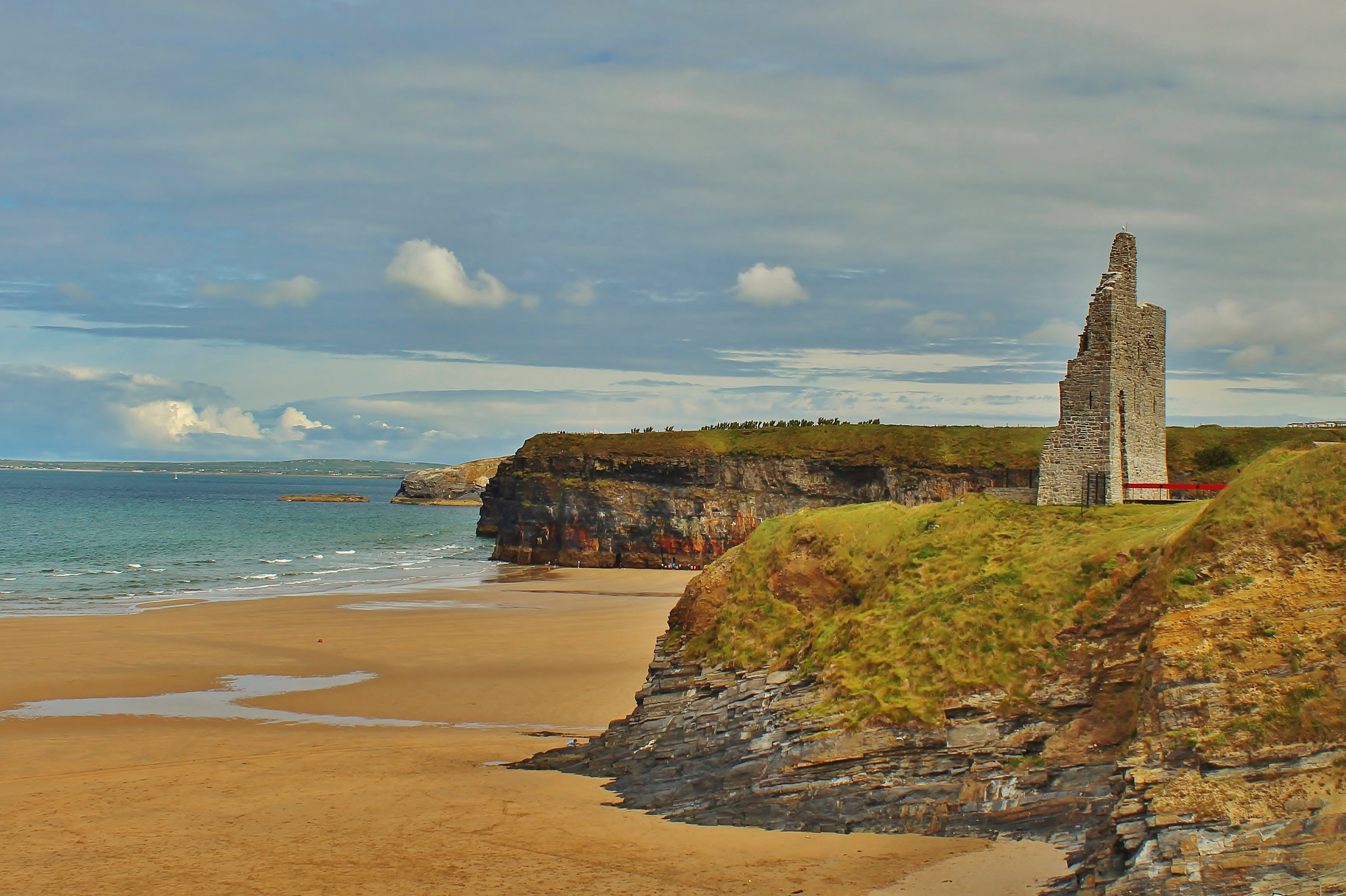
- Ballybunion Castle and coastline

- Location in Ireland
- Coordinates: 52.510°N 9.672°W
- Country: Ireland
- Province: Munster
- County: County Kerry
- Elevation: 30 m (98 ft)

Population (2022)
  - Total: 1,618
- Irish Grid Reference: Q862415

Ballybunion or Ballybunnion (Irish: Baile an Bhuinneánaigh) is a coastal town and seaside resort in County Kerry, Ireland, on the Wild Atlantic Way, 15 km (9 mi) from the town of Listowel. As of the 2022 census, Ballybunion had a population of 1,618.

== Name ==
The Placenames Database of Ireland associates the town's Irish language name, Baile an Bhuinneánaigh or the 'town(land) of An Buinneánach', with the Anglo-Norman surname "Bunyan". The Bunyan (Bonzon) family were historically associated with Ballybunion Castle.

== History ==
Evidence of ancient settlement in the area includes promontory fort and ring fort sites in the townlands of Ballybunion and Doon West.

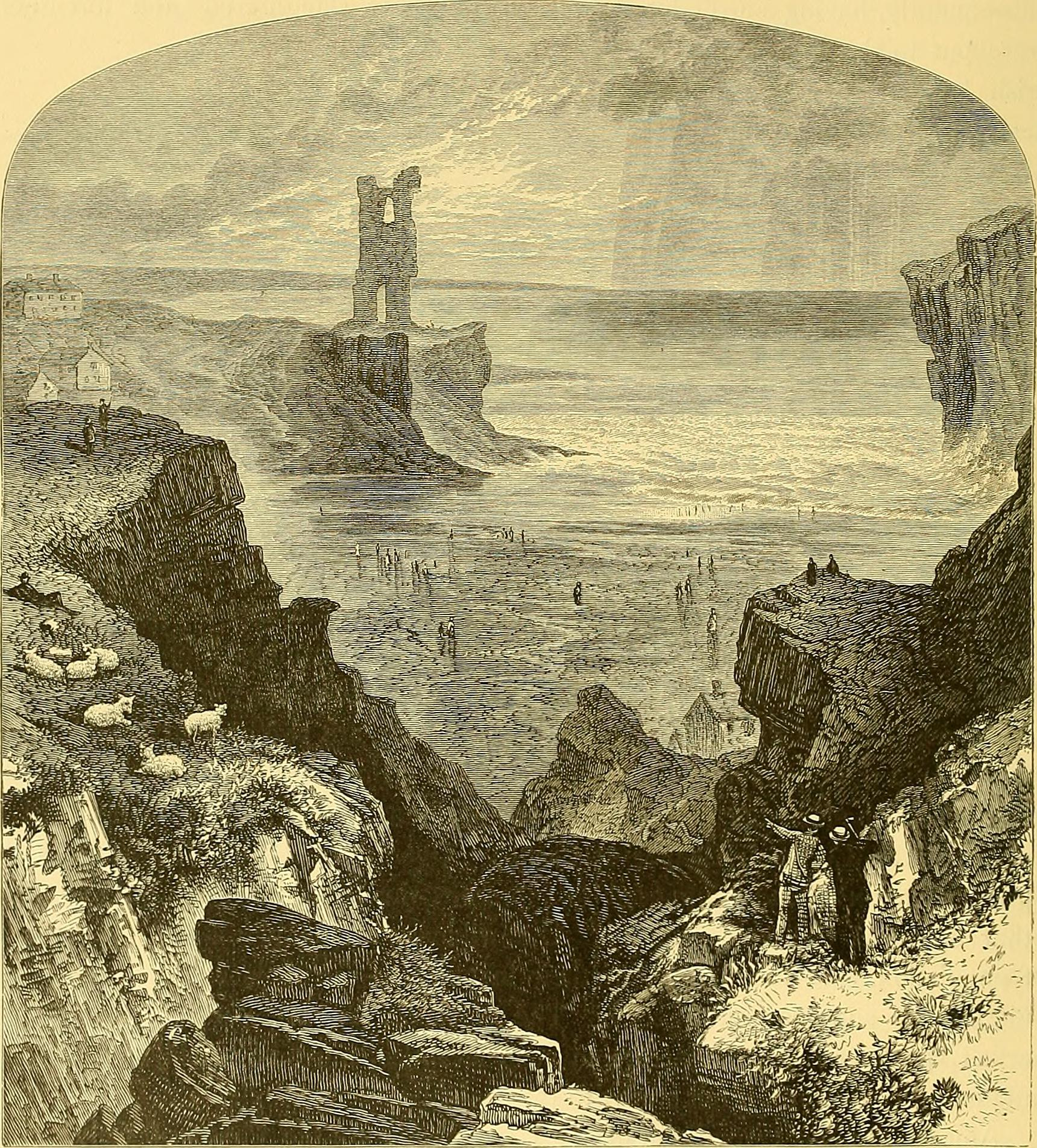
Ballybunnion Castle

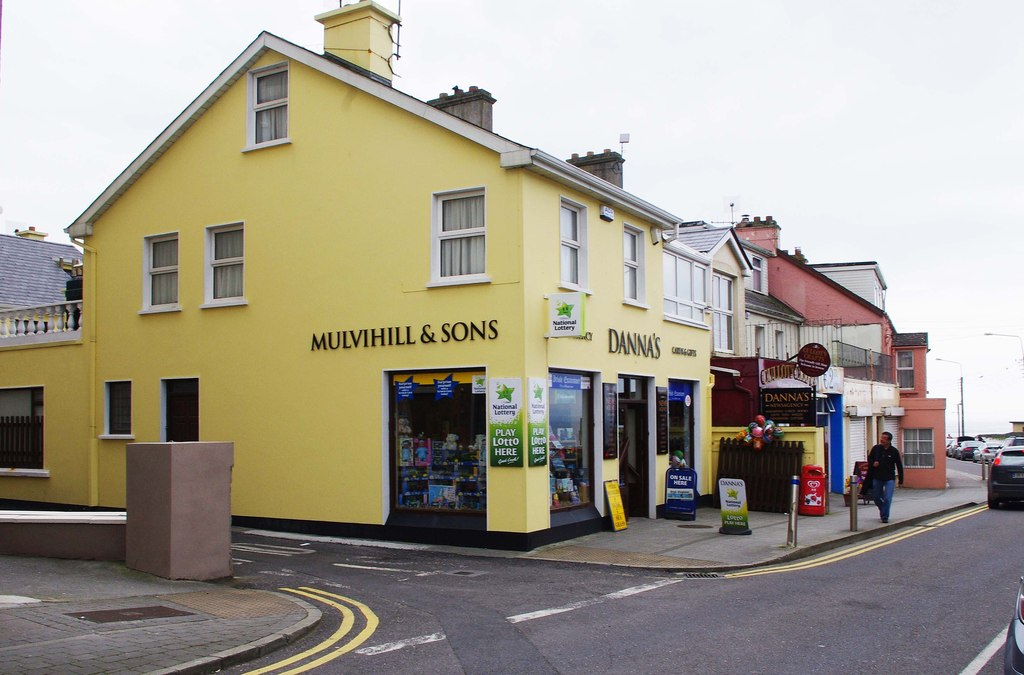
Ballybunnion's main street

Ballybunion Castle was built in the early 16th century, on the site of an earlier promontory fort, by the (Geraldine) Fitzmaurice family. It was destroyed by Lord Kerry in 1582. The castle was associated with the Bunyan family until the late 16th century, when William Óg Bunyan's lands were confiscated following the Desmond Rebellion. The castle has been a protected national monument since the 1920s. A number of buildings within the town itself date to the 19th century, with the former Church of Ireland church (now a public library) and the Roman Catholic church dating to 1879 and 1897 respectively.

== Tourism ==
Ballybunion has two main beaches, divided by the ruins of Ballybunion Castle on the cliff top overlooking the sandy beaches. The one on the north is the Ladies Beach, and the one on the south is the Men's Beach, names arising from the fact that both sexes previously swam on separate beaches. Further south of the Men's Beach lies the Long Strand, a 3.2 km stretch of sand, overlooked by the sand dunes of Ballybunion Golf Club.

In the summer, Ballybunion attracts tourists, and the beaches near Ballybunion are a common surfing site, with a dedicated surf school on the Men's Beach. Other traditions include seaweed baths, featuring sea water with serrated wrack. The town itself has a number of restaurants, pubs and cafes, and schools.

== Sport ==
=== Golf ===
Ballybunion Golf Club was founded in 1893 and was previously ranked at number seven in Golf Digest's "100 Best Courses Outside the USA". There are 2 courses, the Old Course and the Cashen Course, both situated beside the beach. The club hosted the Murphy's Irish Open in 2000 and the Palmer Cup in 2004. Located on Sandhill Road, the club has the largest, most formidable sand dunes in Ireland. Notable holes on the Old Course include the par-3 7th hole known as "Watson's", named after Tom Watson, who played the course during the 1981 Irish Open. Other notable professional golfers who have played the Old Course include Tiger Woods, Rory McIlroy and Ian Baker-Finch. There have been other notable guests that have played there including in 2001 the late astronaut Neil Armstrong. A statue in the town commemorates a golfing visit, in 1998, by then US President Bill Clinton.

=== Gaelic football ===
The local Gaelic football team, Beale GAA club, is named after a small townland a couple of miles up the coast from Ballybunion. Founded in 1972, the club's colours are green and red. It fields teams in competitions organised by the North Kerry Football Board.

The club's grounds, at Stack Park, are situated off Sandhill Road. This floodlit pitch provides training and matches for several divisions of players (incl under 8s, 10s, junior, and senior) as well as ladies football.

=== Health and leisure ===
Ballybunion Health & Leisure Centre opened in 2007 and is situated on Kit Ahern Road.

== Notable people ==
- Patrick Joseph James Keane (1872–1928), Bishop of the Roman Catholic Diocese of Sacramento in California
- Denis "Ogie" Moran (b. 1956), Gaelic footballer
- Eoin Liston (b. 1957), Gaelic footballer
- Richard Wall (b. 1976 or 1977) film and TV actor

== Gallery ==
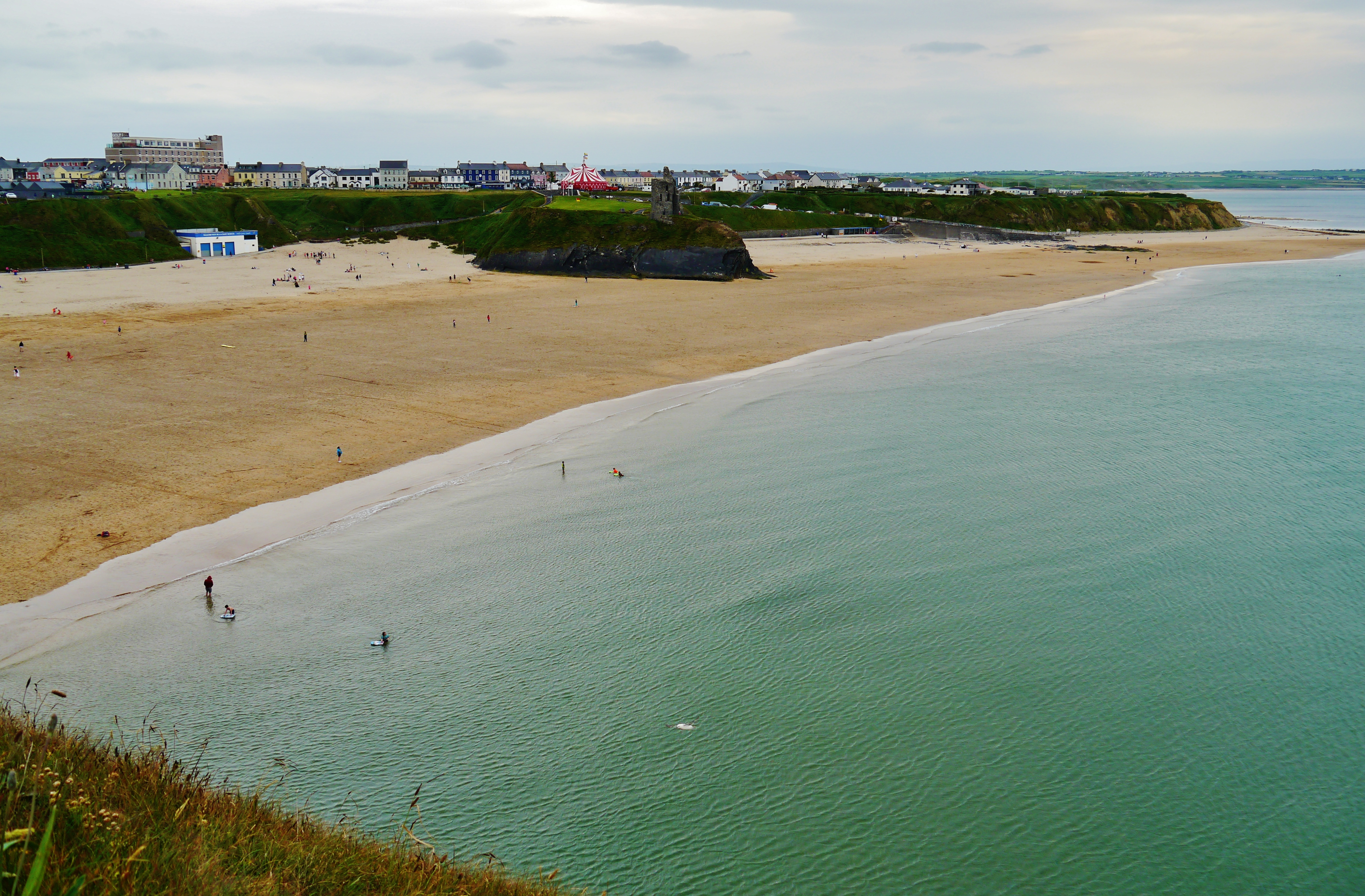
Ladies and Mens Beach

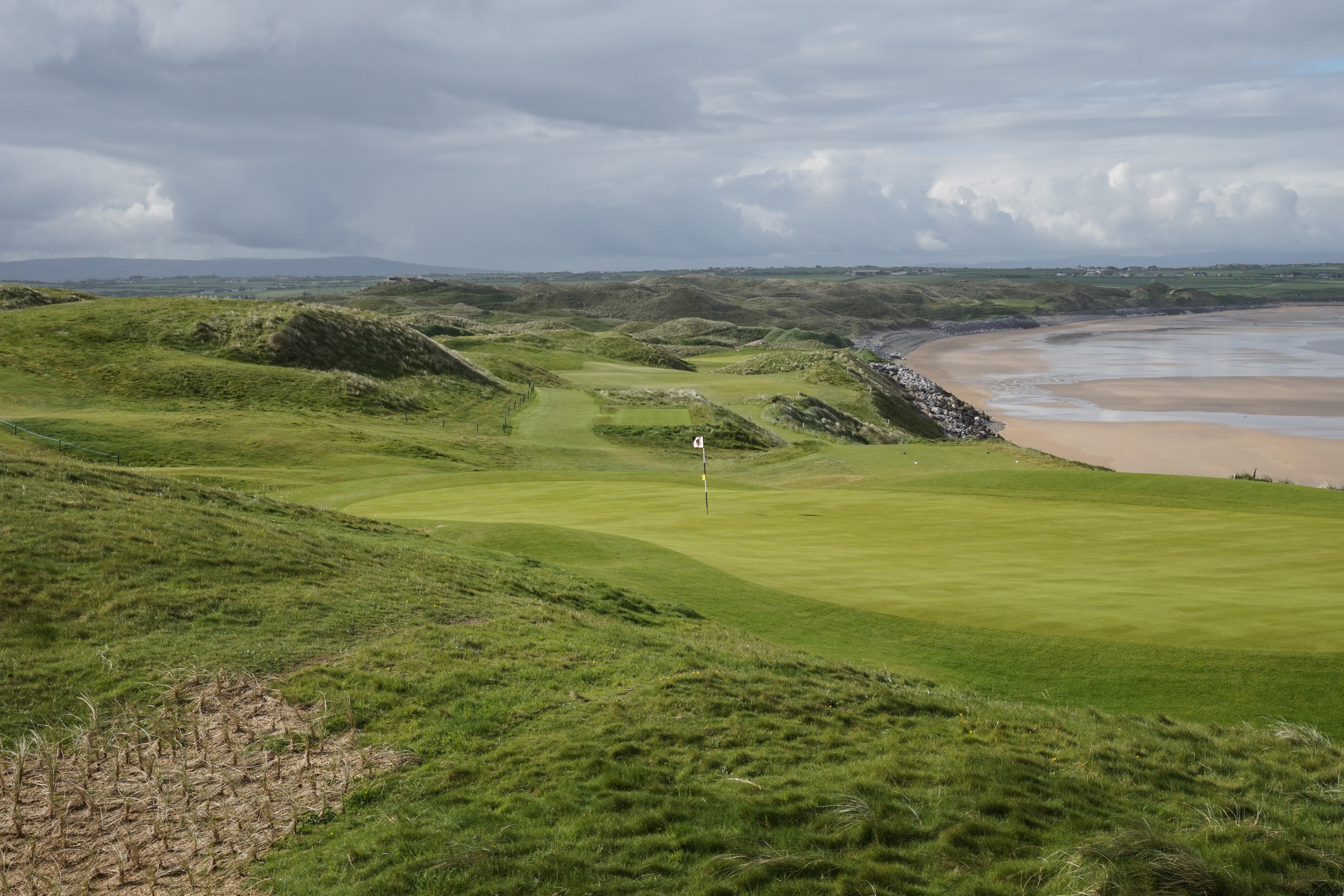
Ballybunion Golf Club

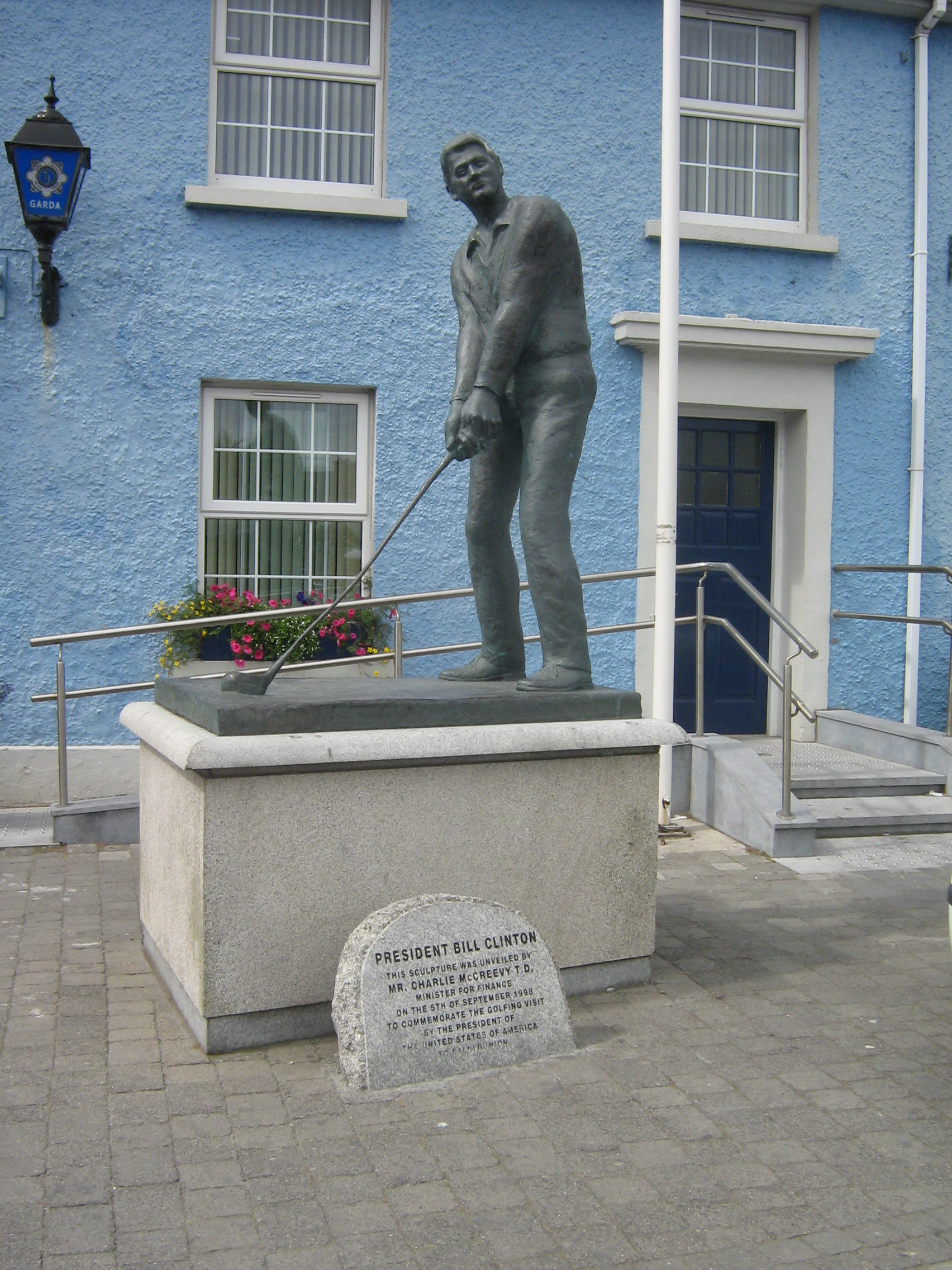
Bill Clinton statue

St. John's Church

Statue of Mary Young

St John's Cemetery

== See also ==
- List of towns and villages in Ireland
- Surfing in Ireland
