= Brosna, County Kerry =

Village in County Kerry, Ireland

Brosna Brosnach
- Village
- Location in Ireland
- Coordinates: 52°18′43″N 9°16′01″W
- Country: Ireland
- Province: Munster
- County: County Kerry

Population (2022)
  - Total: 174
- Time zone: UTC+0 (WET)
  - Summer (DST): UTC-1 (IST (WEST))
- Irish Grid Reference: R746888

Brosna (Irish: Brosnach) is a village and parish situated in the Sliabh Luachra area of County Kerry, Ireland. It lies 16 km (9.9 mi) from the town of Castleisland. The civil parish of Brosna consists of the village and a number of townlands. It is a mainly agricultural area, supporting two churches, two schools, a post office, and five public houses.

== Geography ==
Brosna is a village in north east County Kerry. A number of Munster rivers have their sources in the parish, including the Clydagh, the Braonach, and the Munster Blackwater. The highest point is Mount Eagle. It is in the barony of Trughanacmy. Crochaun Mountain is 1,400 feet (430 m) above sea level.

Brosna lies close to the Cork/Kerry and Kerry/Limerick borders, and neighbouring towns include Castleisland and Knocknagoshel in Kerry, Abbeyfeale and Mountcollins in Limerick, and Ballydesmond and Rockchapel in Cork.

== History ==
In Samuel Lewis's 1837 Topographical Dictionary of Ireland, Brosna was recorded as having 2168 inhabitants in 18,013 statute acres. The same entry notes that a "large portion of the land consisted of coarse mountain pasture and bog, the greater part of which might be reclaimed". As of the first half of the 19th century, there were 2 private schools in the area, in which approximately 120 children were educated. Lewis also records that the Whiteboys (an agrarian organisation involved in "disturbances" in support of tenant farmer rights) were active in the area in the 1820s.

The placename of Brosna or Brosnach may translate from the Irish for dried wood or fire wood.

== Church and well ==
A thatched church was built about 1800 in the grounds of the graveyard near the present church.

The present church of "St Moling & St Carthage" was built in 1868 to designs by architect George Ashlin. This church is in Gothic Revival style, and built with sandstone rubble walls and limestone ashlar dressings. The church is dedicated to Saint Moling, and was reputedly built from stone quarried from the lands in Knopoge, with local farmers bringing the stone to the site by horse and cart. Many of the stained glass windows were donated by parishioners. The design of the marble altar is attributed to Augustus Pugin. The marble altar rails are newer, and were donated by Denis Guiney in 1946, in memory of his parents Cornelius and Julia Guiney. Denis Guiney (1893–1967) was a native of Brosna, and had been a long-term operator of the Guineys and Clerys stores in Dublin. The church's stone presbytery was also built in the late 1860s. The presbytery was restored in 1998, and a restoration on the church itself was completed in 2010.

Also close to Brosna, in the foothills of Sliabh Luachra, is a holy well associated with Saint Moling. The well is reputedly close to the spot where Saint Moling (c.614–697) was born. The well has been a place of pilgrimage over the years, with visits to the well traditionally occurring every Saturday in May.

== Sport ==
The local Gaelic Athletic Association (GAA) club, Brosna GAA, is primarily a Gaelic football club. Established in 1888, the club participates in the North Kerry Senior Football Championship. The club won the 2014–15 All-Ireland Junior Club Football Championship.

== Notable people ==
- Sr Consilio Fitzgerald (born 1937), Irish nun who set up Cuan Mhuire
- Eddie Lenihan (born 1950), folklorist

== See also ==
- List of towns and villages in Ireland
- Brosnan
