= Seán Geaney =

Personal information
- Born: County Kerry, Ireland

Sport
- Sport: Gaelic football
- Position: Forward
Club
- Years: Club
- 1990s – 2000s: An Daingean
Inter-county
Years	County	Apps (scores)
1990–1996	Kerry	8 (3–04)
Inter-county titles
- Munster titles: 2
Club management
- Years: Club
- 2018–: Dingle
		1	0
Inter-county management
- Years: Team
- 2004–2005 2008–2009: Kerry Minor; Kerry U21
Inter-county titles as manager
County	League	Province	All-Ireland
Kerry	1	1	1

Seán Geaney is a Gaelic football coach and selector. In the 2008 season, he was a selector with the Kerry senior football team and managed the Kerry team which won the All-Ireland Under-21 Football Championship.

He played senior football for Kerry in the 1990s and was a star player with Dingle GAA and West Kerry. Geaney was manager of the Kerry Minor Football team in 2004 and 2005. Under new manager Pat O'Shea, Geaney became a Kerry selector for 2007 and 2008. In 2008, Geaney was also appointed as the Kerry U21 manager. The team won the Munster championship and subsequently reached the All-Ireland final, in which they overcame Kildare.
