= Timmy Fleming =

Irish former sportsman

Personal information
- Native name: Tadhg Pléimeann (Irish)
- Born: 1969 (age 56–57) Killorglin, County Kerry
- Height: 5 ft 11 in (180 cm)

Sport
- Sport: Gaelic football
- Position: Left corner-forward
Club
- Years: Club
- 1980s-2000s: Laune Rangers
Club titles
- Kerry titles: 4
- Munster titles: 1
- All-Ireland Titles: 1
Inter-county
| Years | County | Apps (scores) |
| 1989-1994 | Kerry | 12 (1-10) |
Inter-county titles
- Munster titles: 1

Timmy Fleming (born 1969 in Killorglin, County Kerry) is an Irish former sportsman. He played Gaelic football with his local club Laune Rangers and was a member of the Kerry senior inter-county team between 1989 and 1994.

Sporting positions
| Preceded by Seán Burke | Kerry Senior Football Captain; 1994 | Succeeded by Darren Aherne |
