= Ballylongford GAA =

Gaelic games club in County Kerry, Ireland

Ballylongford
- Béal Átha Longfoirt
- County: Kerry
- Colours: Blue & White
- Grounds: O'Rahilly Park, Ballylongford
- Coordinates: 52°32′37″N 9°28′25″W

Playing kits
Standard colours

Ballylongford GAA is a Gaelic Athletic Association club from the village of Ballylongford in County Kerry, Ireland. They have won 13 North Kerry Senior Football Championships.

== Honours ==
- North Kerry Senior Football Championship: 13
  - 1940, 1941, 1943, 1947, 1953, 1968, 1970, 1971, 1974, 1975, 1986, 1993, 2000
- Kerry Intermediate Football Championship: 3
  - 1971,1972, 1976,

== Notable players ==
- Paddy Kelly All-Ireland Senior Football Championship winner.
- John Kennedy Three time All-Ireland Senior Football Championship winner.
- Éamonn O'Donoghue Two time All-Ireland Senior Football Championship winner. Five time National Football League winner.
- Paudie O'Donoghue Two time All-Ireland Senior Football Championship winner. Five time National Football League winner.
- Johnny Walsh five time All-Ireland Senior Football Championship winner.
