= Beale GAA =

Gaelic football club in County Kerry, Ireland

Beale
- Beal CLG
- Founded: 1972
- County: Kerry
- Colours: Green, red and black
- Grounds: Stack Park
- Coordinates: 52°30′20″N 9°40′18″W

Playing kits
Standard colours

Beale GAA (Irish: Cumann Lúthchleas Gael Biaille) is a Gaelic football club based in the town of Ballybunion, County Kerry, Ireland. Founded in 1972, the club fields teams in competitions organised by the North Kerry Football Board. Beale won the North Kerry Senior Football Championship in 2014. Sand in our Boots, a book published in October 2016 and recording the history of Beale GAA club, won the GAA's 2016 MacNamee Award for 'best GAA club publication'.

== Honours ==
- North Kerry Senior Football Championship (8): 1977, 1978, 1979, 1981, 1982, 1984, 1989, 2014
- Kerry Intermediate Football Championship (1): 1984
- Kerry Novice Football Championship (2): 1977, 2005

== Notable players ==
Former or current inter-county players who have played for the Beale senior team include:

- Eoin 'Bomber' Liston Seven time All-Ireland Senior Football Championship winner. Four time All-Star winner.
- Denis 'Ogie' Moran Eight time All-Ireland Senior Football Championship winner. 1978 All-Ireland Senior Football Championship winning captain.
