= 1998 Kerry Senior Football Championship =

Gaelic football competition

- Teams: 17
- Sponsor: Allied Irish Bank
- Champions: East Kerry (6th title); John Crowley (captain)
- Runners-up: St. Kieran's; Seán O'Connor (captain)

Tournament statistics
- Matches played: 17
- Goals scored: 29 (1.71 per match)
- Points scored: 389 (22.88 per match)
- Top scorer(s): Seán McElligott (1-33)

The 1998 Kerry Senior Football Championship was the 98th staging of the Kerry Senior Football Championship since its establishment by the Kerry County Board in 1889. The draw for the opening round fixtures took place on 24 February 1998.

East Kerry entered the championship as the defending champions.

The final was played on 4 October 1998 at Austin Stack Park in Tralee, between East Kerry and St. Kieran's, in what was their first ever meeting in the final. East Kerry won the match by 2-13 to 1-10 to claim their sixth championship title overall and a second title in succession.

Seán McElligott was the championship's top scorer with 1-33.

== Results ==
=== Preliminary round ===
14 June 1998 Preliminary round	Kerins O'Rahilly's	0-11 - 2-17	St. Kieran's	Austin Stack Park
	V Murphy 0-7, J Morrissey 0-1, G O'Brien 0-1, M Fitzgerald 0-1, S McCarthy 0-1.		S McElligott 0-7, J Dennehy 1-1, J McGlynn 0-4, G O'Keeffe 1-0, L Brosnan 0-3, K Scanlon 0-1, D Dennehy 0-1.

=== Round 1 ===
13 June 1998 Round 1	Laune Rangers	0-15 - 1-11	Kenmare	J. P. O'Sullivan Park
	MF Russell 0-7, P O'Sullivan 0-3, P Griffin 0-2, L Hassett 0-1, B Gannon 0-1, S O'Sullivan 0-1.		B O'Neill 1-4, K Moriarty 0-2, F O'Sullivan 0-2, S O'Shea 0-1, L Lynch 0-1, J O'Sullivan 0-1.

14 June 1998 Round 1	Dr. Crokes	1-14 - 1-13	Mid Kerry	Páirc de Búrca
	R Neher 0-7, C Murphy 1-1, N O'Leary 0-3, E Brosnan 0-2, P O'Shea 0-1.		I Twiss 0-5, J Daly 1-0, K Foley 0-3, W Harmon 0-2, G McGrath 0-2, K O'Connor 0-1.

14 June 1998 Round 1	Austin Stacks	1-06 - 0-11	Killarney Legion	Austin Stack Park
	D Ahern 0-6, D McEvoy 1-0.		C O'Grady 0-3, S Culloty 0-2, B McCullough 0-2, D Culloty 0-2, D O'Donoghue 0-1, D O'Mahony 0-1.

20 June 1998 Round 1	St. Brendan's	1-15 - 0-05	John Mitchels	Ardfert Grounds
	T O'Connell 0-7, G Hussey 0-6, B Clifford 1-0, S Flaherty 0-1, A Murphy 0-1.		B Dennehy 0-3, A Moynihan 0-1, C O'Brien 0-1.

10 July 1998 Round 1	Castleisland Desmonds	1-08 - 0-13	Feale Rangers	Castleisland Grounds
	J Brennan 0-4, WD O'Connor 1-0, K Lynch 0-2, T Burke 0-1, K Dillon 0-1.		N Kennelly 0-8, E Galvin 0-2, T Kennelly 0-1, E Breen 0-1, G Stack 0-1.

11 July 1998 Round 1	Shannon Rangers	1-05 - 0-13	St. Kieran's	O'Rahilly Park
	G O'Brien 1-0, D O'Connor 0-1, J O'Connell 0-1, O Horgan 0-1, E Hennessy 0-1, B Bambury 0-1.		S McElligott 0-6, J McGlynn 0-2, K Scanlon 0-1, L McEnery 0-1, J Dennehy 0-1, G O'Keeffe 0-1, T O'Connor 0-1.

11 July 1998 Round 1	Kilcummin	1-07 - 1-08	South Kerry	Kilcummin Grounds
	M O'Connor 1-0, S O'Leary 0-2, P McCarthy 0-2, W Maher 0-1, C O'Donoghue 0-1, R Cronin 0-1.		J O'Shea 1-2, JD O'Shea 0-4, S O'Shea 0-1, B Hussey 0-1.

12 July 1998 Round 1	East Kerry	2-13 - 1-14	West Kerry	FitzGerald Stadium
	P O'Donoghue 1-7, J Crowley 1-1, J Murphy 0-3, S Moynihan 0-1, MD Cahill 0-1.		riarty 1-5, S Geaney 0-3, JJ Corduff 0-2, B Hannafin 0-1, J Ferriter 0-1.

=== Quarter-finals ===
7 August 1998 Quarter-final	East Kerry	1-17 - 1-08	Dr. Crokes	FitzGerald Stadium
	P O'Donoghue 1-4, J Crowley 0-4, J Murphy 0-4, L Murphy 0-3, D O'Sullivan 0-1, S Óg O'Leary 0-1.		P O'Shea 0-6, P O'Brien 1-0, N O'Leary 0-1, R Neher 0-1.

8 August 1999 Quarter-final	South Kerry	1-09 - 1-09	St. Kieran's	FitzGerald Stadium
	J Quirke 1-0, M Fitzgerald 0-3, J O'Shea 0-2, S Hussey 0-2, S O'Sullivan 0-1, J O'Shea 0-1.		S McElligott 1-5, J McGlynn 0-2, J Dennehy 0-1, G O'Keeffe 0-1.

9 August 1998 Quarter-final	Killarney Legion	1-13 - 2-08	Feale Rangers	Fitzgerald Stadium
	C O'Grady 1-7, D Culloty 0-3, S Culloty 0-2, WC O'Sullivan 0-1.		E Fitzmaurice 1-1, T Kennelly 1-1, N Kennelly 0-2, J Corridan 0-2, C Galvin 0-1, S Stack 0-1.

9 August 1998 Quarter-final	Laune Rangers	0-19 - 1-09	St. Brendan's	Austin Stack Park
	MF Russell 0-6, P O'Sullivan 0-6, G Murphy 0-3, M Hassett 0-2, L Hassett 0-1, B Gannon 0-1.		T O'Connell 0-4, S O'Flaherty 1-0, E Sayers 0-2, E O'Connor 0-1, J Enright 0-1, G Hussey 0-1.

5 September 1999 Quarter-final replay	St. Kieran's	0-14 - 0-07	South Kerry	FitzGerald Stadium
	S McElligott 0-5, DD O'Rahilly 0-3, T O'Connor 0-2, G O'Keeffe 0-1, L Brosnan 0-1, D Dennehy 0-1, J McGlynn 0-1.		M Fitzgerald 0-3, J O'Shea 0-2, JD O'Shea 0-1, J Cronin 0-1.

=== Semi-finals ===
20 September 1998 Semi-final	East Kerry	2-17 - 0-12	Killarney Legion	FitzGerald Stadium
	J Murphy 0-6, J Crowley 1-2, S Flynn 1-0, S Óg O'Leary 0-3, L Murphy 0-2, MD Cahill 0-2, D Daly 0-1, S Moynihan 0-1.		C O'Grady 0-6, B McCullagh 0-2, D O'Donoghue 0-2, S Culloty 0-1, D Culloty 0-1.

20 September 1998 Semi-final	St Kieran's	1-14 - 1-11	Laune Rangers	FitzGerald Stadium
	S McElligott 0-5, K Scanlon 1-0, D Dennehy 0-3, J McGlynn 0-3, J Dennehy 0-2, T O'Mahony 0-1.		B Gannon 1-1, MF Russell 0-4, P O'Sullivan 0-3, M Hassett 0-1, G Murphy 0-1, P McKenna 0-1.

=== Final ===
5 October 1998 Final	East Kerry	2-13 - 1-10	St. Kieran's	Austin Stack Park
	J Crowley 1-1, L Murphy 1-1, J Murphy 0-4, S Óg O'Leary 0-3, C McCarthy 0-1, D Moynihan 0-1, S Flynn 0-1, P O'Donoghue 0-1.		S McElligott 0-5, J Dennehy 1-1, J McGlynn 0-3, S O'Connor 0-1.

== Championship statistics ==
=== Top scorers ===
Overall

Rank	Player	Club	Tally	Total	Matches	Average
1	Seán McElligott	St. Kieran's	1-33	36	6	6.00
2	Cathal O'Grady	Killarney Legion	1-16	19	3	6.33
3	Paud O'Donoghue	East Kerry	2-12	18	4	4.50
4	John Crowley	East Kerry	3-08	17	4	4.25
4	Mike Frank Russell	Laune Rangers	0-17	17	3	5.66
4	Jerry Murphy	East Kerry	0-17	17	4	4.25
7	John McGlynn	St. Kieran's	0-15	15	6	2.50
8	Jack Dennehy	St. Kieran's	2-06	12	6	2.00
8	Pa O'Sullivan	Laune Rangers	0-12	12	3	4.00
10	Tom O'Connell	St. Brendan's	0-11	11	2	5.50

In a single game

Rank	Player	Club	Tally	Total	Opposition
1	Paud O'Donoghue	East Kerry	1-07	10	West Kerry
1	Cathal O'Grady	Killarney Legion	1-07	10	Feale Rangers
3	Murt Moriarty	East Kerry	1-05	8	West Kerry
3	Seán McElligott	St. Kieran's	1-05	8	South Kerry
3	Noel Kennelly	Feale Rangers	0-08	8	Desmonds
6	Brendan O'Neill	Kenmare	1-04	7	Laune Rangers
6	Paud O'Donoghue	East Kerry	1-04	7	Dr. Crokes
6	Vinnie Murphy	Kerins O'Rahilly's	0-07	7	St Kieran's
6	Seán McElligott	St. Kieran's	0-07	7	Kerins O'Rahilly's
6	Mike Frank Russell	Laune Rangers	0-07	7	Kenmare
6	Roland Neher	Dr. Crokes	0-07	7	Mid Kerry
6	Tom O'Connell	St. Brendan's	0-07	7	John Mitchels

=== Miscellaneous ===
- St. Kieran's qualified for the final for the first time since 1988.
