= 1992 Kerry Senior Football Championship =

Gaelic football competition

- Dates: 27 June - 27 September 1992
- Teams: 18
- Sponsor: Allied Irish Bank
- Champions: Mid Kerry (3rd title); Seán Burke (captain); John P. O'Sullivan (manager)
- Runners-up: St. Brendan's; Christy Walsh (captain); Maurice Leahy (manager)

Tournament statistics
- Matches played: 17
- Goals scored: 34 (2 per match)
- Points scored: 323 (19 per match)
- Top scorer(s): Séamus Murphy (1-23)

The 1992 Kerry Senior Football Championship was the 92nd staging of the Kerry Senior Football Championship since its establishment by the Kerry County Board in 1889. The championship ran from 27 June to 27 September 1992.

Dr. Crokes entered the championship as the defending champions, however, they were beaten by St. Brendan's in the semi-finals.

The final was played on 27 September 1992 at Austin Stack Park in Tralee, between Mid Kerry and St. Brendan's, in what was their first ever meeting in the final. Mid Kerry won the match by 3–9 to 1–10 to claim their third championship title overall and a first title in 21 years.

Séamus Murphy was the championship's top scorer with 1-23.

== Results ==
=== Preliminary round ===
27 June 1992 Preliminary round	Castleisland Desmonds	0-12 - 0-06	John Mitchels	Castleisland Grounds
	M Downey 0-3, D Murphy 0-2, D Browne 0-2, T Roche 0-1, D Hanifin 0-1, J Lordan 0-1, C Kearney 0-1, T Sullivan 0-1.		F O'Brien 0-3, J Roche 0-1, J Dowd 0-1, JJ Sheehy 0-1.

28 June 1992 Preliminary round	Austin Stacks	1-10 - 1-02	Kenmare	Austin Stack Park
	L Kearns 1-0, D Aherne 0-3, E Moynihan 0-2, P Laide 0-1, J Smith 0-1, J Barry 0-1, J Walsh 0-1, D McEvoy 0-1.		L Lynch 1-0, T Clifford 0-1, M Crowley 0-1.

=== Round 1 ===
27 June 1992 Round 1	Gneeveguilla	1-07 - 0-09	Shannon Rangers	Gneeveguilla Grounds
	M Finnegan 1-3, G Looney 0-1, M Doyle 0-1, A O'Donovan 0-1, N O'Donovan 0-1.		J Kennedy 0-7, J Foley 0-1, TJ O'Connor 0-1.

28 June 1992 Round 1	Dr. Crokes	2-12 - 1-11	St. Kieran's	FitzGerald Stadium
	D Cooper 1-3, P O'Shea 0-5, C Doherty 1-1, C Murphy 0-2, G O'Shea 0-1.		T Brosnan 1-4, S McElligott 0-3, DD O'Rahilly 0-2, K Scanlon 0-1, F Casey 0-1.

28 June 1992 Round 1	South Kerry	1-07 - 2-11	Mid Kerry	Con Keating Park
	K Burns 1-0, P Keane 0-2, P Curran 0-2, S O'Sullivan 0-1, M Galvin 0-1, M Fitzgerald 0-1.		W Maher 1-2, G McGrath 1-0, S Burke 0-2, B O'Sullivan 0-2, T Evans 0-2, L Kelliher 0-1, M Dennehy 0-1, J Courtney 0-1.

28 June 1992 Round 1	West Kerry	0-11 - 0-10	Kerins O'Rahilly's	Austin Stack Park
	S Geaney 0-5, W Lynch 0-3, J Doyle 0-2, C Geaney 0-1.		M O'Carroll 0-5, T Kennedy 0-2, M Nix 0-1, S McCarthy 0-1, N O'Mahony 0-1.

4 July 1992 Round 1	Killarney	0-11 - 0-15	Castleisland Desmonds	FitzGerald Stadium
	C O'Grady 0-3, S Culloty 0-2, D O'Donoghue 0-2, D Culloty 0-2, J Keane 0-1, M McAuliffe 0-1.		C Kearney 0-6, J Lordan 0-2, M Downey 0-2, D Hanifin 0-1, D Browne 0-1, D Murphy 0-1, T Roche 0-1, WD O'Connor 0-1.

4 July 1992 Round 1	Beale	1-07 - 1-11	St. Brendan's	Ballybunion Grounds
	F Stack 0-5, G Costelloe 1-0, M Purtill 0-1, P Guerin 0-1.		S Murphy 0-6, J Hegarty 1-2, B Clifford 0-1, C Walshe 0-1, E Ryle 0-1.

5 July 1992 Round 1	East Kerry	1-10 - 1-06	Austin Stacks	Kilcummin Grounds
	Paud O'Donoghue 1-5, D Guerin 0-1, E Bowler 0-1, S Moynihan 0-1, D Moynihan 0-1, Pat O'Donoghue 0-1.		B O'Sullivan 1-1, D Aherne 0-2, L Kearns 0-1, J Barry 0-1, C Kennedy 0-1.

5 July 1992 Round 1	Feale Rangers	1-07 - 0-06	Laune Rangers	Moyvan Grounds
	E Bowler 1-0, T O'Connell 0-3, M Kennelly 0-3, G Stack 0-1.		T Fleming 0-2, P Griffin 0-1, P McKenna 0-1, B O'Shea 0-1, B O'Sullivan 0-1.

=== Quarter-finals ===
25 July 1992 Quarter-final	St. Brendan's	2-11 - 1-06	Castleisland Desmonds	Austin Stack Park
	S Murphy 1-7, P O'Driscoll 1-0, J Hegarty 0-1, T O'Connell 0-1, C Walsh 0-1, B Clifford 0-1.		D Hannafin 1-0, M Downey 0-3, J Lordan 0-1, C Kearney 0-1, WD O'Connor 0-1.

26 July 1992 Quarter-final	Mid Kerry	2-09 - 0-12	Gneeveguilla	FitzGerald Stadium
	T Evans 2-0, B O'Sullivan 0-2, W Maher 0-2, K O'Sullivan 0-2, L Kelleher 0-1, G Doyle 0-1, S Counihan 0-1.		M Finnegan 0-4, A O'Donovan 0-3, A Looney 0-3, M Doyle 0-1, G Looney 0-1.

26 July 1992 Quarter-final	East Kerry	2-09 - 0-10	Feale Rangers	Austin Stack Park
	P O'Donoghue 1-5, J O'Sullivan 1-1, K O'Sullivan 0-1, D Guerin 0-1, E Bowler 0-1.		J O'Connell 0-2, M Kennelly 0-2, E Bowler 0-2, J Stack 0-1, S Stack 0-1, M Kennelly (Moyvane) 0-1, S Carrig 0-1.

26 July 1992 Quarter-final	Dr. Crokes	2-09 - 0-12	West Kerry	Austin Stack Park
	P O'Shea 0-5, R Neher 1-0, G O'Shea 0-2, N O'Leary 0-1, V Casey 0-1.		S Geaney 0-3, F Ashe 0-2, W Lynch 0-2, C Geaney 0-2, T Doyle 0-1, M Moriarty 0-1, G Farrell 0-1.

=== Semi-finals ===
22 August 1992 Semi-final	Mid Kerry	3-10 - 1-07	East Kerry	Austin Stack Park
	S Burke 2-1, G O'Connor 1-0, W Maher 0-3, L Kelliher 0-2, B O'Sullivan 0-1, T Evans 0-1, K O'Sullivan 0-1, Daly 0-1.		P O'Donoghue 1-2, S Moynihan 0-2, J Crowley 0-1, E Bowler 0-1, J O'Sullivan 0-1.

23 August 1982 Semi-final	St. Brendan's	1-11 - 2-07	Dr. Crokes	Austin Stack Park
	C Walsh 1-1, S Murphy 0-4, J Hegarty 0-3, C Kearney 0-1, B Clifford 0-1, T O'Connell 0-1.		P O'Shea 1-1, V Casey 1-1, R Neher 0-2, G O'Shea 0-2, D Cooper 0-1.

=== Final ===
27 September 1992 Final	Mid Kerry	3-09 - 1-10	St. Brendan's	Austin Stack Park
	W Maher 0-5, G McGrath 1-0, C O'Sullivan 1-0, B Breen 1-0, B O'Sullivan 0-2, L Kelliher 0-1, J Daly 0-1.		S Murphy 0-6, T O'Connell 1-1, P O'Driscoll 0-1, B McElligott 0-1, C Walsh 0-1.	Referee: R Williams (Dingle)

== Championship statistics ==
=== Top scorers ===
Overall

Rank	Player	Club	Tally	Total	Matches	Average
1	Séamus Murphy	St. Brendan's	1-23	26	4	6.50
2	Paud O'Donoghue	East Kerry	3-12	21	3	7.00
3	Willie Maher	East Kerry	1-12	15	4	3.75
4	Pat O'Shea	East Kerry	1-11	14	4	3.50
5	Mike Finnegan	Gneeveguilla	1-07	10	2	5.00
6	Seán Burke	Mid Kerry	2-03	9	4	2.25
6	Tommy Evans	Mid Kerry	2-03	9	4	2.25
6	John Hegarty	St. Brendan's	1-06	9	4	2.25
9	Seán Geaney	West Kerry	0-08	8	2	4.00
9	Christy Kearney	Desmonds	0-08	8	3	2.66
9	Martin Downey	Desmonds	0-08	8	3	2.66

In a single game

Rank	Player	Club	Tally	Total	Opposition
1	Séamus Murphy	St. Brendan's	1-07	10	Desmonds
2	Paud O'Donoghue	East Kerry	1-05	8	Austin Stacks
2	Paud O'Donoghue	East Kerry	1-05	8	Feale Rangers
4	Seán Burke	Mid Kerry	2-01	7	East Kerry
4	Timmy Brosnan	St. Kieran's	1-04	7	Dr. Crokes
4	John Kennedy	Shannon Rangers	0-07	7	Gneeveguilla
6	Tommy Evans	Mid Kerry	2-00	6	Gneeveguilla
6	Mike Finnegan	Gneeveguilla	1-03	6	Shannon Rangers
6	Danny Cooper	Dr. Crokes	1-03	6	St. Kieran's
6	Christy Kearney	Desmonds	0-06	6	Killarney
6	Séamus Murphy	St. Brendan's	0-06	6	Beale
6	Séamus Murphy	St. Brendan's	0-06	6	Mid Kerry

=== Miscellaneous ===
- Mid Kerry won the title for the first time in 21 years.
- St. Brendan's qualified for the final for the first time.
