= 1991 Kerry Senior Football Championship =

Gaelic football competition

- Dates: 29 June - 22 September 1991
- Teams: 18
- Sponsor: Allied Irish Bank
- Champions: Dr. Crokes (5th title); Seánie O'Shea (captain); Eddie O'Sullivan (manager)
- Runners-up: Castleisland Desmonds; Eugene Leonard (captain); Donal O'Connor (manager)

Tournament statistics
- Matches played: 19
- Goals scored: 34 (1.79 per match)
- Points scored: 354 (18.63 per match)
- Top scorer(s): Ger O'Shea (0-22)

The 1991 Kerry Senior Football Championship was the 91st staging of the Kerry Senior Football Championship since its establishment by the Kerry County Board in 1889. The championship ran from 29 June to 22 September 1991.

West Kerry entered the championship as the defending champions, however, they were beaten by Dr. Crokes in a first round replay.

The final was played on 22 September 1991 at Austin Stack Park in Tralee, between Dr. Crokes and Castleisland Desmonds, in what was their first ever meeting in the final. Dr. Crokes won the match by 2-10 to 1-10 to claim their fifth championship title overall and a first title in 77 years.

Ger O'Shea was the championship's top scorer with 0-22.

== Results ==
=== Prelininary round ===
30 June 1991 Preliminary round	Gneeveguilla	1-06 - 1-12	Laune Rangers	Gneeveguilla Grounds
	D Brosnan 1-0, S O'Leary 0-3, A O'Donovan 0-1, N O'Donovan 0-1, J O'Donovan 0-1.		J Shannon 0-6, T Fleming 1-0, T Corkery 0-3, P Griffin 0-2, T Byrne 0-1.

30 June 1991 Preliminary round	Kerins O'Rahilly's	1-12 - 1-04	Feale Rangers	Strand Road
	R Cullen 1-1, R Fahey 0-3, P Hoare 0-2, N O'Mahony 0-2, K Savage 0-1, C Sheehy 0-1, T Nix 0-1, T Kennedy 0-1.		B Kiely 1-0, S Carrig 0-2, J O'Connell 0-2.

=== First round ===
29 June 1991 First round	St. Brendan's	1-05 - 0-08	Castleisland Desmonds	Ardfert Grounds
	S Murphy 1-2, B McElligott 0-2, K Kearney 0-1.		T Brosnan 0-4, M Downey 0-2, C Kearney 0-1, T Roche 0-1.

29 June 1991 First round	East Kerry	2-08 - 1-04	Beale	Bishop Moynihan/Tim Lenihan Park
	P O'Donoghue 0-4, J Burke 1-0, E Bowler 1-0, T Brosnan 0-3, D MOynihan 0-1.		E Walsh 0-3, S Linnane 1-0, E Liston 0-1.

30 June 1991 First round	John Mitchels	1-09 - 0-06	Kenmare	Boherbee Grounds
	T O'Dowd 1-0, D McEvoy 0-3, K Kelliher 0-2, R O'Dowd 0-1, J O'Dowd 0-1, B Murphy 0-1, G Kilgallen 0-1.		E McCarthy 0-3, S O'Sullivan 0-1, J Moriarty 0-1, T Spillane 0-1.

7 July 1991 First round replay	Castleisland Desmonds	1-09 - 0-10	St. Brendan's	Castleisland Grounds
	D Buckley 1-1, M Downey 0-4, T Brosnan 0-3, D Lyne 0-1.		S Murphy 0-5, J Clifford 0-2, T O'Connell 0-2, C Ryle 0-1.

7 July 1991 First round	Austin Stacks	0-11 - 0-10	Killarney	Connolly Park
	D Staunton 0-5, E Moynihan 0-3, J Walsh 0-1, L Kerins 0-1, G O'Keeffe 0-1.		D Culloty 0-6, M McAuliffe 0-2, L O'Connor 0-2.

7 July 1991 First round	St. Kieran's	1-07 - 0-06	Laune Rangers	Scartaglin Grounds
	J O'Regan 1-1, S McElligott 0-2, B Walsh 0-1, K Scanlon 0-1, T O'Donoghue 0-1, P Dennehy 0-1.		T Fleming 0-2, T Corkery 0-2, P Prendeville 0-1, J Shannon 0-1.

7 July 1991 First round	Mid Kerry	1-13 - 0-11	Shannon Rangers	Frank Sheehy Park
	W Maher 1-6, D O'Sullivan 0-6, G Doyle 0-1.		J Kennedy 0-5, J Mulvihill 0-3, J Hartnett 0-1, T Mulvihill 0-1, S Stack 0-1.

13 July 1991 First round	West Kerry	0-13 - 2-07	Dr. Crokes	Páirc an Aghasaigh
	M Moriarty 0-5, S Geaney 0-4, D Farrell 0-2, B Driscoll 0-1, F Ashe 0-1.		P O'Shea 1-2, R Neher 1-1, G O'Shea 0-3, C Murphy 0-1.

13 July 1991 First round	Kerins O'Rahilly's	1-08 - 0-12	South Kerry	Austin Stack Park
	R Cullen 1-2, R Fahy 0-3, T Kennedy 0-1, P Hoare 0-1, C Sheehy 0-1.		M Fitzgerald 0-4, T Dennehy 0-3, P O'Connor 0-2, J Cronin 0-1, R O'Dwyer 0-1, P Keane 0-1.

23 July 1991 First round replay	Dr. Crokes	1-14 - 1-08	West Kerry	FitzGerald Stadium
	G O'Shea 0-6, L Hartnett 1-0, C Doherty 0-3, V Casey 0-1, R Neher 0-1, C O'Shea 0-1, N O'Leary 0-1, P O'Shea 0-1.		F Ashe 1-0, D Farrell 0-2, M Moriarty 0-2, T Connor 0-1, G Farrell 0-1, P McCarthy 0-1, B Driscoll 0-1.

=== Quarter-finals ===
28 July 1991 Quarter-final	South Kerry	0-11 - 2-09	Castleisland Desmonds	Con Keating Park
	M Fitzgerald 0-7, P Keane 0-2, P O'Connor 0-2.		T Brosnan 1-2, C Kearney 1-1, D Hanifin 0-2, D Murphy 0-2, S Curtin 0-1, M Downey 0-1.

28 July 1991 Quarter-final	St. Kieran's	1-10 - 0-11	Mid Kerry	Páirc de Búrca
	S McEligott 0-4, S Lambe 1-0, T Brosnan 0-3, M Moriarty 0-2, P Dennehy 0-1.		B O'Sullivan 0-4, P O'Grady 0-2, T Evans 0-2, B Breen 0-1, J Doyle 0-1, W Maher 0-1.

9 August 1991 Quarter-final	John Mitchels	2-07 - 1-09	Austin Stacks	Austin Stack Park
	J Hegarty 1-1, T O'Dowd 1-0, J O'Dowd 0-2, D McEvoy 0-1, A Gleeson 0-1, K Kelliher 0-1, C Kennedy 0-1.		E Moynihan 1-4, D Aherne 0-2, D Staunton 0-1, J Barry 0-1.

16 August 1991 Quarter-final	Dr. Crokes	2-14 - 2-10	East Kerry	FitzGerald Stadium
	G O'Shea 0-7, M Buckley 1-3, L Hartnett 1-0, P O'Shea 0-2, D Cooper 0-1, S O'Shea 0-1.		J Burke 1-2, S Moynihan 1-0, P O'Donoghue 0-3, D Dineen 0-2, D O'Donoghue 0-1, D Moynihan 0-1, E Bowler 0-1.

=== Semi-finals ===
24 August 1991 Semi-final	Dr. Crokes	0-16 - 0-11	John Mitchels	Austin Stack Park
	G O'Shea 0-6, P O'Shea 0-5, N O'Leary 0-2, S O'Shea 0-2, C Doherty 0-1.		J Hegarty 0-5, T O'Dowd 0-2, J Roche 0-1, A Gleeson 0-1, G Kilgallon 0-1, C Kennedy 0-1.

25 August 1991 Semi-final	Castleisland Desmonds	2-07 - 2-06	St. Kieran's	Austin Stack Park
	D Hannafin 1-1, D Murphy 1-1, T Brosnan 0-2, WD O'Connor 0-1, S Curtin 0-1, D Lucey 0-1.		T Brosnan 1-1, S Lambe 1-0, S McElligott 0-3, K Scanlon 0-1, J O'Regan 0-1.

=== Final ===
22 September 1991 Final	Dr. Crokes	2-10 - 1-10	Castleisland Desmonds	Austin Stack Park
	P O'Shea 0-5, R Neher 1-0, C Hartnett 1-0, C Doherty 0-2, V Casey 0-2, C Murphy 0-1.		D Hannafin 1-0, T Brosnan 0-3, M Downey 0-3, S Curtin 0-2, D Lyne 0-1, WD O'Connor 0-1.	Referee: M O'Sullivan (Ballyheigue)

== Championship statistics ==
=== Top scorers ===
Overall

Rank	Player	Club	Tally	Total	Matches	Average
1	Ger O'Shea	Dr. Crokes	0-22	22	5	4.40
2	Pat O'Shea	Dr. Crokes	1-15	18	5	3.60
3	Tom Brosnan	Castleisland Desmonds	1-14	17	5	3.40
4	Maurice Fitzgerald	South Kerry	0-11	11	2	5.50
5	Willie Maher	Mid Kerry	1-07	10	2	5.00
5	Eoin Moynihan	Austin Stacks	1-07	10	2	5.00
5	Séamus Murphy	St. Brendan's	1-07	10	2	5.00
5	Brian O'Sullivan	Mid Kerry	0-10	10	2	5.00
5	Martin Downey	Castleisland Desmonds	0-10	10	5	2.00

In a single game

Rank	Player	Club	Tally	Total	Opposition
1	Willie Maher	Mid Kerry	1-06	9	Shannon Rangers
2	Eoin Moynihan	Austin Stacks	1-04	7	John Mitchels
2	Maurice Fitzgerald	South Kerry	0-07	7	John Mitchels
2	Ger O'Shea	Dr. Crokes	0-07	7	East Kerry
5	Mike Buckley	Dr. Crokes	1-03	6	East Kerry
5	Joe Shannon	Laune Rangers	0-06	6	Gneeveguilla
5	Donal Culloty	Killarney	0-06	6	Austin Stacks
5	Brian O'Sullivan	Mid Kerry	0-06	6	Shannon Rangers
5	Ger O'Shea	Dr. Crokes	0-06	6	West Kerry
5	Ger O'Shea	Dr. Crokes	0-06	6	John Mitchels

=== Miscellaneous ===
- Dr. Crokes won the title for the first time in 77 years.
- Castleisland Desmonds qualified for the final for the first time.
