= 1980 Kerry Senior Football Championship =

Gaelic football competition

- Dates: 21 June - 28 September 1980
- Teams: 16
- Champions: Feale Rangers (2nd title); Tom O'Connell (captain)
- Runners-up: Austin Stacks; Mikey Sheehy (captain)

Tournament statistics
- Matches played: 15
- Goals scored: 43 (2.87 per match)
- Points scored: 253 (16.87 per match)
- Top scorer(s): Mikey Sheehy (3-16)

The 1980 Kerry Senior Football Championship was the 80th staging of the Kerry Senior Football Championship since its establishment by the Kerry County Board in 1889. The championship ran from 21 June to 28 September 1980.

AUstin Stacks entered the championship as the defending champions.

The final was played on 28 September 1980 at Austin Stack Park in Tralee, between Feale Rangers and Austin Stacks, in what was their first ever meeting in the final. Feale Rangers won the match by 1-10 to 1–07 to claim their second championship title overall and a first title in two years.

Mikey Sheehy was the championship's top scorer with 3-16.

== Results ==
=== First round ===
21 June 1980 First round	Killarney	3-10 - 2-05	Na Fianna	Listry Grounds
	J O'Donoghue 1-3, D O'Donoghue 1-2, D Murphy 1-0, D Lyne 0-2, M O'Grady 0-1, N Brosnan 0-1, C Galvin 0-1.		S Kelly 1-0, J Cahillane 1-0, J Kennedy 0-3, C Coakley 0-2.

21 June 1980 First round	South Kerry	1-09 - 2-04	Laune Rangers	Con Keating Park
	P Landers 0-5, P O'Mahony 1-0, P O'Connor 0-3, J Egan 0-1.		J Sheehan 2-0, J Shannon 0-2, MF O'Shea 0-1, P O'Riordan 0-1.

22 June 1980 First round	Spa	1-10 - 0-11	John Mitchels	Austin Stack Park
	T Regan 1-1, C Dowling 0-4, S Kelleher 0-2, S Cronin 0-1, P O'Mahony 0-1, P Casey 0-1.		J Dowd 0-4, T Dowd 0-2, M O'Donnell 0-2, D Fitzgerald 0-1, J Kerins 0-1, R Flahive 0-1.

22 June 1980 First round	Eoin Rua	2-11 - 2-09	Kenmare	Glenflesk Grounds
	M O'Riordan 0-5, H Moynihan 1-1, N O'Donovan 1-1, S O'Leary 0-2, J Kelly 0-1, D Murphy 0-1.		T Spillane 1-2, D Dwyer 1-1, M O'Sullivan 0-2, PJ McIntyre 0-1, D Finnegan 0-1, P Spillane 0-1, M Maybury 0-1.

22 June 1980 First round	Mid Kerry	3-11 - 1-07	Kerins O'Rahilly's	J. P. O'Sullivan Park
	D Hartnett 2-0, P Foley 1-0, M Grady 0-3, B Coffey 0-2, P O'Sullivan 0-2, D Coffey 0-2, J Coffey 0-2.		S Walsh 1-0, S Kissane 0-3, J Collins 0-2, G O'Connell 0-1, S Rogers 0-1.

=== Second round ===
13 July 1980 Second round	Mid Kerry	3-03 - 0-10	St. Brendan's	Austin Stack Park
	P Foley 2-1, M Moriarty 1-0, B Coffey 0-1, J Coffey 0-1.		M Ferris 0-4, J Carroll 0-2, E O'Sullivan 0-1, P McCarthy 0-1, G Mahony 0-1, M Leahy 0-1.

13 July 1980 Second round	Killarney	1-06 - 0-08	South Kerry	J. P. O'Sullivan Park
	N Brosnan 1-1, D O'Donoghue 0-3, J O'Donoghue 0-1, D Lyne 0-1.		P O'Mahony 0-2, G O'Driscoll 0-2, P O'Connor 0-1, JP Curran 0-1, P Landers 0-1, T O'Connell 0-1.

13 July 1980 Second round	Eoin Rua	2-12 - 2-07	Spa	FitzGerald Stadium
	S O'Leary 1-4, A O'Donovan 1-3, M O'Donovan 0-2, D Twomey 0-1, D Moynihan 0-1, H Moynihan 0-1.		P O'Mahony 2-0, S Doolin 0-3, S Kelliher 0-2, N Doherty 0-1, C Cronin 0-1.

=== Quarter-finals ===
26 July 1980 Quarter-final	Feale Rangers	2-16 - 2-02	Eoin Rua	Moyvane Grounds
	J Mulvihill 1-5, J Sheehy 1-2, R Bunyan 0-3, E Sweeney 0-2, T Kennelly 0-2, P O'Connell 0-1, T O'Sullivan 0-1.		JD O'Keeffe 1-0, D Cahill 1-0, H Moynihan 0-1, S O'Leary 0-1.	Referee: T Keane (Caherciveen)

27 July 1980 Quarter-final	Mid Kerry	1-06 - 0-05	Castleisland Desmonds	J. P. O'Sullivan Park
	M Moriarty 1-1, B Lynch 0-3, J Coffey 0-1, P O'Sullivan 0-1.		PJ Kerins 0-2, M Kerins 0-1, B Lyons 0-1, E Walsh 0-1.

27 July 1980 Quarter-final	Austin Stacks	2-11 - 1-04	West Kerry	Austin Stack Park
	M Sheehy 2-7, B O'Sullivan 0-2, JL McElligott 0-2.		J Doyle 1-0, P Ó Sé 0-2, D Higgins 0-1, G Casey 0-1.	Referee: J Conway

27 July 1980 Quarter-final	Shannon Rangers	1-11 - 1-06	Killarney	Ballylongford Grounds
	B Walsh 1-3, E Liston 0-3, J Walsh 0-2, J King 0-1, P Liston 0-1, E O'Donoghue 0-1.		P O'Donoghue 1-0, D Lyne 0-2, C Galvin 0-1, D O'Donoghue 0-1, N Brosnan 0-1, J O'Donoghue 0-1.

=== Semi-finals ===
31 August 1980 Semi-final	Austin Stacks	3-13 - 2-13	Shannon Rangers	Austin Stack Park
	J Power 2-3, M Sheehy 1-5, L Kerins 0-2, G Power 0-2, P Sugrue 0-1.		E Liston 2-1, J Walsh 0-5, B Walsh 0-5, S Liston 0-1, D Liston 0-1.	Referee: J Conway (Laune Rangers)

31 August 1980 Semi-final	Feale Rangers	0-11 - 1-05	Mid Kerry	Austin Stack Park
	J Mulvihill 0-6, G O'Sullivan 0-2, J Deenihan 0-1, R Bunyan 0-1, P O'Connell 0-1.		B Lynch 0-4, P Foley 1-0, J Sheehan 0-1.	Referee: T Brennan (Castleisland)

=== Final ===
28 September 1980 Final	Feale Rangers	1-10 - 1-07	Austin Stacks	Austin Stack Park
	J Mulvihill 1-4, P O'Connell 0-2, T O'Connell 0-1, S Walsh 0-1, G O'Sullivan 0-1, R Bunyan 0-1.		B O'Sullivan 1-2, M Sheehy 0-4, J O'Keeffe 0-1.	Referee: T Keane (Caherciveen)

== Championship statistics ==
=== Top scorers ===
Overall

Rank	Player	Club	Tally	Total	Matches	Average
1	Mikey Sheehy	Austin Stacks	3-16	25	3	8.33
2	Johnny Mulvihill	Feale Rangers	2-15	21	3	7.00
3	Pat Foley	Mid Kerry	4-01	13	4	3.25
4	Barry Walsh	Shannon Rangers	1-08	11	2	5.50
5	Eoin Liston	Shannon Rangers	2-04	10	2	5.00
5	Seánie O'Leary	Eoin Rua	1-07	10	3	3.33

In a single game

Rank	Player	Club	Tally	Total	Opposition
1	Mikey Sheehy	Austin Stacks	2-07	13	West Kerry
2	Jackie Power	Austin Stacks	2-03	9	Shannon Rangers
3	Johnny Mulvihill	Feale Rangers	1-05	8	Eoin Rua
3	Mikey Sheehy	Austin Stacks	1-05	8	Shannon Rangers
5	Pat Foley	Mid Kerry	2-01	7	St. Brendan's
5	Eoin Liston	Shannon Rangers	2-01	7	Austin Stacks
5	Seánie O'Leary	Eoin Rua	1-04	7	Spa
5	Johnny Mulvihill	Feale Rangers	1-04	7	Austin Stacks
9	James Sheehan	Laune Rangers	2-00	6	South Kerry
9	Donie Hartnett	Mid Kerry	2-00	6	Kerins O'Rahilly's
9	Paudie O'Mahony	Spa	2-00	6	Eoin Rua
9	Johnny O'Donoghue	Killarney	1-03	6	Na Fianna
9	Ambrose O'Donovan	Eoin Rua	1-03	6	Spa
9	Barry Walsh	Shannon Rangers	1-03	6	Killarney
9	Johnny Mulvihill	Feale Rangers	0-06	6	Mid Kerry
