= 1995 Kerry Senior Football Championship =

Gaelic football competition

- Dates: 10 June - 8 October 1995
- Teams: 18
- Sponsor: Allied Irish Bank
- Champions: Laune Rangers (9th title); Gerard Murphy (captain); John Evans (manager)
- Runners-up: East Kerry; Séamus Moynihan (captain); Tommy O'Regan (manager)

Tournament statistics
- Matches played: 18
- Goals scored: 38 (2.11 per match)
- Points scored: 349 (19.39 per match)
- Top scorer(s): Paud O'Donoghue (0-20)

The 1995 Kerry Senior Football Championship was the 95th staging of the Kerry Senior Football Championship since its establishment by the Kerry County Board in 1889. The championship ran from 10 June to 8 October 1995.

Austin Stacks entered the championship as the defending champions, however, they were beaten by Spa-Gneeveguilla in the second round.

The final was played on 8 October 1995 at Austin Stack Park in Tralee, between Laune Rangers and East Kerry, in what was their first ever meeting in the final. Laune Rangers won the match by 1-07 to 0-06 to claim their ninth championship title overall and a first title in two years.

East Kerry's Paud O'Donoghue was the championship's top scorer with 0-20.

== Results ==
=== Round 1 ===
10 June 1995 Round 1	Killarney Legion	0-10 - 0-07	Kerins O'Rahilly's	FitzGerald Stadium
	C O'Grady 0-5, S Culloty 0-2, D Culloty 0-1, S O'Dwyer 0-1, J Culloty 0-1.		C O'Brien 0-3, N O'Sullivan 0-2, I Mellerick 0-1, M Fitzgerald 0-1.

11 June 1995 Round 1	West Kerry	0-11 - 1-08	John Mitchels	Páirc an Aghasaigh
	S Geaney 0-4, M Moriarty 0-2, C O'Donnell 0-2, J Ferriter 0-1, M Griffin 0-1, D Ó Sé 0-1.		K Murphy 1-0, F O'Brien 0-3, A Moynihan 0-3, O Kelliher 0-1, JJ Sheehy 0-1.

4 July 1995 Round 1 replay	West Kerry	1-12 - 0-07	John Mitchels	Austin Stack Park
	D Ó Cinnéide 0-6, J Ferriter 1-0, C O'Donnell 0-2, S Geaney 0-2, M Ó Conchúir 0-1, C O'Dowd 0-1.		F O'Brien 0-4, M O'Connor 0-1, J Higgins 0-1, E Kelleher 0-1.

=== Round 2 ===
10 June 1995 Round 2	Kenmare	2-11 - 2-06	St. Kieran's	Fr. Breen Park
	M Price 1-3, J O'Sullivan 1-0, T Spillane 0-2, F O'Sullivan 0-2, P Spillane 0-2, T Clifford 0-1, T Óg O'Brien 0-1.		S Lambe 1-0, J McGlynn 1-0, S McElligott 0-3, K Scanlon 0-2, P Dennehy 0-1.

11 June 1995 Round 2	Mid Kerry	2-09 - 1-07	St. Brendan's	Páirc de Búrca
	M Burke 1-3, G Doyle 1-2, V O'Donoghue 0-2, G McGrath 0-1, B O'Sullivan 0-1.		S Wallace 1-1, S Murphy 0-2, K Boyle 0-1, B McElligott 0-1, J Enright 0-1, T O'Connell 0-1.

2 July 1995 Round 2	Killarney Legion	0-11 - 2-15	Annascaul	FitzGerald Stadium
	D Culloty 0-4, D O'Donoghue 0-2, S Culloty 0-2, S O'Dwyer 0-2, J McGillycuddy 0-1.		G Farrell 1-5, D Lynch 1-0, S Driscoll 0-3, B Driscoll 0-3, G Williams 0-2, M Moynihan 0-1, S Farrell 0-1.

7 July 1995 Round 2	Spa-Gneeveguilla	0-12 - 1-05	Austin Stacks	Gneeveguilla Grounds
	Murphy 0-5, S Óg O'Leary 0-3, A O'Donovan 0-3, C Gleeson 0-1.		D Aherne 1-2, O Moynihan 0-2, W Kirby 0-1.

7 July 1995 Round 2	Feale Rangers	0-10 - 2-07	Castleisland Desmonds	Páirc na nGael
	M Kennelly 0-3, B Scanlon 0-1, S Stack 0-1, B O'Brien 0-1, C Galvin 0-1, A O'Brien 0-1, T Dillon 0-1.		J Brennan 0-2, M Downey 0-3, N Greaney 0-1, D Buckley 0-1.

9 July 1995 Round 2	West Kerry	1-11 - 1-12	Dr. Crokes	Páirc an Aghasaigh
	D Ó Cinnéide 1-4, J Ferriter 0-2, D Ó Sé 0-1, C O'Dowd 0-1, F Ó Sé 0-1, C O'Donnell 0-1, J Dorgan 0-1.		G O'Shea 1-2, P O'Shea 0-4, R Neher 0-2, N O'Leary 0-1, D Cooper 0-1, B Clarke 0-1, J Fleming 0-1.

9 July 1995 Round 2	East Kerry	2-15 - 3-11	South Kerry	FitzGerald Stadium
	P O'Donoghue 0-6, J Crowley 1-2, S Moynihan 1-2, D Fitzgerald 0-2, D Dineen 0-1, C Long 0-1, D Moynihan 0-1.		J O'Shea 1-2, M Fitzgerald 0-5, R Quigley 1-0, J Quirke 1-0, K O'Dwyer 0-2, K Burns 0-1, SP O'Sullivan 0-1.

10 July 1995 Round 2	Laune Rangers	1-10 - 0-11	Shannon Rangers	J. P. O'Sullivan Park
	C Kearney 1-1, T Fleming 0-4, B O'Shea 0-2, L Hassett 0-2, P Griffin 0-1.		J Kennedy 0-5, L Flaherty 0-2, L Weir 0-2, J O'Connell 0-1, E Hennessy 0-1.

=== Quarter-finals ===
28 July 1995 Quarter-final	Laune Rangers	2-10 - 1-03	Spa-Gneeveguilla	Austin Stack Park
	T Fleming 0-5, C Kearney 1-0, B O'Sullivan 1-0, L Hassett 0-1, J Shannon 0-1, J O'Shea 0-1, P Griffin 0-1, B O'Shea 0-1.		Mossie Cronin 1-0, A O'Donovan 0-1, Maurice Cronin 0-1, S Óg O'Leary 0-1.

29 July 1995 Quarter-final	Kenmare	0-13 - 1-08	Castleisland Desmonds	FitzGerald Stadium
	F O'Sullivan 0-3, L Lynch 0-3, P Spillane 0-2, T Óg O'Brien 0-2, J O'Sullivan 0-1, S McIntyre 0-1, J Moriarty 0-1.		N Greaney 1-0, D Browne 0-3, J Brennan 0-2, D Hanafin 0-1, M Lyons 0-1.

29 July 1995 Quarter-final	East Kerry	0-16 - 0-09	Dr. Crokes	FitzGerald Stadium
	P O'Donoghue 0-9, D Dineen 0-2, J Crowley 0-2, D O'Donoghue 0-1, S Moynihan 0-1, B Fitzgerald 0-1.		P O'Shea 0-2, C Murphy 0-2, G O'Shea 0-2, D Cooper 0-1, V Casey 0-1, R Neher 0-1.

30 July 1995 Quarter-final	Annascaul	1-13 - 1-07	Mid Kerry	Austin Stack Park
	W Lynch 1-1, G Farrell 0-3, B Driscoll 0-2, M Moynihan 0-2, T Falvey 0-2, S O'Driscoll 0-2, G Williams 0-1.		M Burke 1-0, G McGrath 0-2, B O'Sullivan 0-2, G Doyle 0-1, F Kelliher 0-1, J Daly 0-1.

=== Semi-finals ===
24 September 1995 Semi-final	Laune Rangers	3-12 - 2-04	Kenmare	Austin Stack Park
	L Hassett 2-0, T Fleming 0-6, G Murphy 1-1, P Griffin 0-3, C Kearney 0-1, B O'Shea 0-1.		L Lynch 1-0, F O'Sullivan 1-0, P Spillane 0-2, T Spillane 0-1, J O'Sullivan 0-1.

24 September 1995 Semi-final	East Kerry	2-12 - 2-11	Annascaul	Austin Stack Park
	D O'Donoghue 2-1, J Crowley 0-4, P O'Donoghue 0-3, S Moynihan 0-2, J O'Sullivan 0-1, S O'Leary 0-1.		G Farrell 1-3, W Lynch 1-1, B O'Driscoll 0-2, S Farrell 0-2, S O'Driscoll 0-1, K O'Driscoll 0-1, M Moynihan 0-1.

=== Final ===
8 October 1995 Final	Laune Rangers	1-07 - 0-06	East Kerry	Austin Stack Park
	G Murphy 1-0, T Fleming 0-2, B O'Shea 0-2, L Hassett 0-1, J Shannon 0-1, J O'Shea 0-1.		P O'Donoghue 0-2, J Crowley 0-2, S Moynihan 0-1, D Fitzgerald 0-1.

== Championship statistics ==
=== Top scorers ===
Overall

Rank	Player	Club	Tally	Total	Matches	Average
1	Paud O'Donoghue	East Kerry	0-20	20	4	5.00
2	Gene Farrell	Annascaul	2-11	17	3	5.66
2	Timmy Fleming	Laune Rangers	0-17	17	4	4.25
4	Dara Ó Cinnéide	West Kerry	1-10	13	2	6.50
4	John Crowley	East Kerry	1-10	13	4	3.25
6	Dermot Lynch	Annascaul	3-02	11	3	3.66
7	David O'Donoghue	East Kerry	2-04	10	4	2.50
7	Liam Hassett	Laune Rangers	2-04	10	4	2.50
9	Martin Burke	Mid Kerry	2-03	9	2	4.50
9	Séamus Moynihan	East Kerry	2-03	9	4	2.25

In a single game

Rank	Player	Club	Tally	Total	Opposition
1	Paud O'Donoghue	East Kerry	0-09	9	Dr. Crokes
2	Gene Farrell	Annascaul	1-05	8	Killarney Legion
3	David O'Donoghue	East Kerry	2-01	7	Annascaul
3	Dara Ó Cinnéide	West Kerry	1-04	7	Dr. Crokes
5	Liam Hassett	Laune Rangers	2-00	6	Kenmare
5	Michael Price	Kenmare	1-03	6	St. Kieran's
5	Martin Burke	Mid Kerry	1-03	6	St. Brendan's
5	Gene Farrell	Annascaul	1-03	6	East Kerry
5	Timmy Fleming	Laune Rangers	0-06	6	Kenmare
5	Dara Ó Cinnéide	West Kerry	0-06	6	John Mitchels
5	Paud O'Donoghue	East Kerry	0-06	6	South Kerry
