= 1981 Kerry Senior Football Championship =

Gaelic football competition

- Dates: 13 June - 27 September 1981
- Teams: 16
- Champions: South Kerry (4th title); Paudie Sheahan (captain)
- Runners-up: Austin Stacks; Teddy Brick (captain)

Tournament statistics
- Matches played: 16
- Goals scored: 28 (1.75 per match)
- Points scored: 237 (14.81 per match)

The 1981 Kerry Senior Football Championship was the 81st staging of the Kerry Senior Football Championship since its establishment by the Kerry County Board in 1889. The championship ran from 13 June to 27 September 1981.

Feale Rangers entered the championship as the defending champions, however, they were beaten by Austin Stacks in the semi-finals.

The final was played on 27 September 1981 at Austin Stack Park in Tralee, between South Kerry and Austin Stacks, in what was their first ever meeting in the final. South Kerry won the match by 1-12 to 0-11 to claim their fourth championship title overall and a first title in 23 years.

== Results ==
=== First round ===
13 June 1981 First round	Spa-Glenflesk	0-08 - 0-03	Na Fianna	Spa Grounds

14 June 1981 First round	Castleisland Desmonds	2-09 - 0-05	Kenmare	Currow Grounds

14 June 1981 First round	Laune Rangers	2-08 - 0-04	Eoin Rua	FitzGerald Stadium

14 June 1981 First round	Kerins O'Rahilly's	1-07 - 1-03	Killarney	FitzGerald Stadium

21 June 1981 First round	St. Brendan's	1-04 - 0-06	John Mitchels	Austin Stack Park

=== Second round ===
5 July 1981 Second round	Kerins O'Rahilly's	1-09 - 1-07	Spa-Glenflesk	J. P. O'Sullivan Park
	S Walsh 0-4, N Kelter 1-0, D Keane 0-2, N O'Sullivan 0-1, S Kissane 0-1, M Griffin 0-1.		S Cronin 1-0, P Cronin 0-3, T Regan 0-1, J O'Donoghue 0-1, S Kelleher 0-1, J McCarthy 0-1.

5 July 1981 Second round	Castleisland Desmonds	2-03 - 0-09	West Kerry	Austin Stack Park
	M O'Connor 2-1, E O'Connor 0-1, D O'Connor 0-1.		T Doyle 0-7, D Higgins 0-2.

15 August 1981 Second round	Laune Rangers	3-05 - 1-09	St. Brendan's	Austin Stack Park
	J Griffin 1-1, J O'Dwyer 1-0, MF O'Shea 0-1, A Shannon 0-1, P Prendeville 0-1, F Russell 0-1.		M Ferris 1-1, P Crowley 0-2, P Flaherty 0-1, P Dowling 0-1, T Mahony 0-1, B Courtney 0-1, P McCarthy 0-1, J Connell 0-1.

16 August 1981 Second round replay	Castleisland Desmonds	3-06 - 0-08	West Kerry	Austin Stack Park
	M O'Connor 2-2, P Horan 1-2, D Buckley 0-1, D O'Connor 0-1.		J Doyle 0-3, T Sheehy 0-1, J Healy 0-1, T Doyle 0-1, P O'Shea 0-1, V O'Connor 0-1.

=== Quarter-finals ===
15 August 1981 Quarter-final	Austin Stacks	1-06 - 1-04	Feale Rangers	Finuge Grounds
	M Sheehy 0-4, J Power 1-0, JL McElligott 0-1, L Kerins 0-1.		R Bunyan 1-4.

16 August 1981 Quarter-final	Shannon Rangers	1-15 - 1-08	Mid Kerry	Stack Park
	L Horgan 1-1, E Liston 0-4, J Costello 0-3, J Walsh 0-3, J Kennedy 0-1, D Moran 0-1, T Dee 0-1, S Liston 0-1.		M O'Shea 0-4, D O'Sullivan 1-0, P Lynch 0-2, P Sheehan 0-2.

22 August 1981 Quarter-final	South Kerry	1-09 - 0-09	Castleisland Desmonds	Con Keating Park
	S Fitzgerald 0-5, F Courtney 1-0, P O'Mahony 0-2, P O'Connor 0-1, JP Curran 0-1.		D O'Connor 0-5, W O'Connor 0-2, M O'Connor 0-2.

23 August 1981 Quarter-final	Laune Rangers	0-10 - 0-07	Kerins O'Rahilly's	J. P. O'Sullivan Park
	J Evans 0-4, MF O'Shea 0-4, F Russell 0-1, J Shannon 0-1.		J Collins 0-2, S Kissane 0-2, N O'Sullivan 0-1, M Griffin 0-1, S Walsh 0-1.

=== Semi-finals ===
30 August 1981 Semi-final	South Kerry	1-12 - 1-06	Laune Rangers	Austin Stack Park
	S Fitzgerald 0-4, S Clifford 1-0. P O'Mahony 0-2, G Lynch 0-2, G O'Driscoll 0-1, P Sheehan 0-1, J Egan 0-1, J O'Shea 0-1.		J O'Dwyer 1-0, MF O'Shea 0-2, J Shannon 0-1, J Griffin 0-1, F Russell 0-1, A Shannon 0-1.	Referee: B O'Grady (John Mitchels)

30 August 1981 Semi-final	Austin Stacks	1-09 - 1-06	Shannon Rangers	Austin Stack Park
	N Power 1-1, M Sheehy 0-3, L O'Connell 0-2, D Sugrue 0-1, L Kerins 0-1, JL McElligott 0-1.		L Lynch 1-1, J Walsh 0-2, B Walsh 0-2, J Costello 0-1.	Referee: M Hayes (Kilcummin)

=== Final ===
27 September 1981 Final	South Kerry	1-12 - 0-11	Austin Stacks	Austin Stack Park
	J O'Shea 1-0, S Fitzgerald 0-3, J O'Sullivan 0-3, G O'Driscoll 0-2, P O'Mahony 0-2, JP Curran 0-1, P O'Connor 0-1.		M Sheehy 0-6, N Power 0-1, L Kerins 0-1, JL McElligott 0-1, G Power 0-1, L O'Connell 0-1.	Referee: T Brennan (Castleisland)

== Championship statistics ==
=== Miscellaneous ===
- South Kerry win their first title since 1958.
- South Kerry qualify for the final for the first time since 1958.
