= 1997 Kerry Senior Football Championship =

Gaelic football competition

- Dates: 24 July - 2 November 1997
- Teams: 16
- Sponsor: Allied Irish Bank
- Champions: East Kerry (5th title); John Crowley (captain)
- Runners-up: Laune Rangers; Tommy Byrne (captain)

Tournament statistics
- Matches played: 20
- Goals scored: 27 (1.35 per match)
- Points scored: 420 (21 per match)
- Top scorer(s): Paud O'Donoghue (1-32)

The 1997 Kerry Senior Football Championship was the 97th staging of the Kerry Senior Football Championship since its establishment by the Kerry County Board in 1889. The draw for the opening round fixtures took place on 27 February 1997. The championship ran from 24 July to 2 November 1997.

Laune Rangers entered the championship as the defending champions.

The final was played on 2 November 1997 at Austin Stack Park in Tralee, between East Kerry and Laune Rangers, in what was their first ever meeting in the final. East Kerry won the match by 1-11 to 0-08 to claim their fifth championship title overall and a first title in 27 years.

East Kerry's Paud O'Donoghue was the championship's top scorer with 1-32.

== Results ==
=== Round 1 ===
24 July 1997 Round 1	St. Kieran's	0-12 - 0-10	John Mitchels	Austin Stack Park
	S McElligott 0-3, D Dennehy 0-2, R O'Rahilly 0-2, G O'Keeffe 0-2, J McGlynn 0-1, P Dennehy 0-1, S O'Connor 0-1.		A Moynihan 0-3, F O'Brien 0-3, G Dennehy 0-2, N Healy 0-1, J Fitzgerald 0-1.

25 July 1997 Round 1	Kerins O'Rahilly's	1-08 - 0-11	South Kerry	Austin Stack Park
	M Fitzgerald 1-1, S Wallace 0-2, V Murphy 0-2, T McCarthy 0-1, P O'Connor 0-1, G O'Brien 0-1.		J O'Shea 0-4, M Fitzgerald 0-3, B O'Connor 0-1, K Dwyer 0-1, J Quirke 0-1, D Lynch 0-1.

25 July 1997 Round 1	Austin Stacks	0-16 - 0-06	Feale Rangers	Austin Stack Park
	D Aherne 0-7, E Moynihan 0-5, D McEvoy 0-2, P Laide 0-1, K Kelleher 0-1.		E Fitzmaurice 0-3, E Galvin 0-1, A O'Brien 0-1, M Kelleher 0-1.

26 July 1997 Round 1	East Kerry	1-11 - 2-08	St. Brendan's	FitzGerald Stadium
	J Murphy 1-2, P O'Donoghue 0-4, J Crowley 0-2, S Óg O'Leary 0-1, M O'Donoghue 0-1, D Daly 0-1.		T O'Connell 0-5, P Healy 1-0, B Clifford 1-0, E Ferris 0-1, L Harty 0-1, J Murphy 0-1.

26 July 1997 Round 1	Shannon Rangers	1-10 - 0-13	Killarney Legion	FitzGerald Stadium
	J Kennedy 1-5, M O'Connor 0-2, E Hennessy 0-1, S McGinley 0-1, T Foley 0-1.		C O'Grady 0-6, J McGillycuddy 0-2, D Culloty 0-2, D O'Donoghue 0-1, B McCullagh 0-1, S Culloty 0-1.

27 July 1997 Round 1	Kenmare	1-11 - 2-15	Laune Rangers	Kenmare Grounds
	K Moriarty 0-5, C McSwiney 1-1, B O'Neill 0-4, T Harrington 0-1.		P O'Sullivan 0-7, B O'Shea 1-1, T Byrne 1-0, G Murphy 0-3, P Griffin 0-2, B Gannon 0-1, L Hassett 0-1.

27 July 1997 Round 1	Dr. Crokes	1-07 - 2-09	Mid Kerry	FitzGerald Stadium
	P O'Brien 1-0, R Neher 0-3, D Cooper 0-2, P O'Shea 0-2.		G McGrath 2-0, I Twiss 0-6, Martin Burke 0-2, Mike Burke 0-1.

27 July 1997 Round 1	Castleisland Desmonds	0-08 - 1-11	West Kerry	Castleisland Grounds
	K Lynch 0-4, J Brennan 0-3, S Curtin 0-1.		D Ó Cinnéide 0-6, A Mac Gearailt 1-2, C Geaney 0-1, S Geaney 0-1, M Moynihan 0-1.

1 August 1997 Round 1 replay	East Kerry	0-15 - 0-09	St. Brendan's	Austin Stack Park
	Donoghue 0-10, D Daly 0-1, S Óg O'Leary 0-1, J Crowley 0-1, S Moynihan 0-1, T O'Sullivan 0-1.		T O'Connell 0-5, L Harty 0-1, A Murphy 0-1, E Ferris 0-1, B Clifford 0-1.

1 August 1997 Round 1 replay	Shannon Rangers	1-14 - 0-07	Killarney Legion	Stack Park
	T Foley 1-2, J Kennedy 0-5, L Weir 0-4, O Horgan 0-1, D O'Connor 0-1, K Boyle 0-1.		C O'Grady 0-3, S Culloty 0-2, D Culloty 0-1, J Cronin 0-1.

1 August 1997 Round 1 replay	South Kerry	0-08 - 1-09	Kerins O'Rahilly's	Con Keating Park
	M Fitzgerald 0-4, K O'Dwyer 0-2, D Dwyer 0-1, J O'Shea 0-1.		O Molloy 1-1, M Fitzgerald 0-3, V Murphy 0-3, M O'Shea 0-1, C Sheehy 0-1.

=== Quarter-finals ===
30 August 1997 Quarter-final	Laune Rangers	1-17 - 2-12	St. Kieran's	FitzGerald Stadium
	P O'Sullivan 0-7, MF Russell 1-1, T Fleming 0-3, B O'Shea 0-2, L Hassett 0-2, B Gannon 0-1, J Sheehan 0-1,		L Brosnan 1-2, S McElligott 0-4, R O'Rahilly 0-4, P Dennehy 1-0, G O'Keeffe 0-2.

31 August 1997 Quarter-final	West Kerry	1-08 - 0-11	Mid Kerry	FitzGerald Stadium
	S Geaney 1-2, D Ó Cinnéide 0-3, A Mac Gearailt 0-1, JJ Corduff 0-1, B O'Driscoll 0-1.		I Twiss 0-6, K Foley 0-2, G McGrath 0-2, G O'Connor 0-1.

31 August 1997 Quarter-final	East Kerry	0-13 - 1-03	Shannon Rangers	Austin Stack Park
	P O'Donoghue 0-4, MD Cahill 0-3, J Murphy 0-2, J Crowley 0-2, S Moynihan 0-1, D Daly 0-1.		J O'Connell 1-1, T Foley 0-1, K Boyle 0-1.

7 September 1997 Quarter-final	Austin Stacks	0-15 - 2-05	Kerisn O'Rahilly's	Austin Stack Park
	D McEvoy 0-4, D Aherne 0-3, E Moynihan 0-3, P Laide 0-2, C Kennedy 0-2, W Kirby 0-1.		V Murphy 1-2, S Wallace 1-1, G O'Brien 0-2.

7 September 1997 Quarter-final replay	West Kerry	2-11 - 0-08	Mid Kerry	FitzGerald Stadium
	D Ó Cinnéide 1-2, R Mac Gearailt 1-0, B O'Driscoll 0-3, JJ Corduff 0-3, A Mac Gearailt 0-2, F Ashe 0-1.		I Twiss 0-2, G McGrath 0-2, Martin Burke 0-1, Mike Burke 0-1, C O'Shea 0-1, J Daly 0-1.

=== Semi-finals ===
5 October 1997 Semi-final	Laune Rangers	0-17 - 2-09	West Kerry	FitzGerald Stadium
	P O'Sullivan 0-6, G Murphy 0-4, T Fleming 0-3, S O'Sullivan 0-1, P Prendeville 0-1, P Griffin 0-1, M O'Connor 0-1.		S Geaney 2-0, D Ó Cinnéide 0-4, A Mac Gearailt 0-1, JJ Corduff 0-1, D Ó Sé 0-1, G O'Driscoll 0-1, R Mac Gearailt 0-1.

5 October 1997 Semi-final	East Kerry	0-12 - 0-11	Austin Stacks	FitzGerald Stadium
	MD Cahill 0-4, P O'Donoghue 0-4, J O'Sullivan 0-1, C O'Connor 0-1, M O'Donoghue 0-1, S Moynihan 0-1,.		E Moynihan 0-7, D Aherne 0-2, P Laide 0-1, C Kennedy 0-1.

=== Final ===
12 October 1997 Final	East Kerry	0-12 - 1-09	Laune Rangers	Austin Stack Park
	P O'Donoghue 0-6, D Daly 0-2, MD Cahill 0-1, C O'Connor 0-1, J Crowley 0-1, D Moynihan 0-1.		L Hassett 1-2, P O'Sullivan 0-3, T Fleming 0-2, M Hassett 0-1, MF Russell 0-1.

2 November 1997 Final replay	East Kerry	1-11 - 0-08	Laune Rangers	Austin Stack Park
	P O'Donoghue 1-4, J Murphy 0-4, D Moynihan 0-1, MD Cahill 0-1, J Crowley 0-1.		P O'Sullivan 0-3, MF Russell 0-2, P Griffin 0-1, A Hassett 0-1, M O'Connor 0-1.

== Championship statistics ==
=== Top scorers ===
Overall

Rank	Player	Club	Tally	Total	Matches	Average
1	Paud O'Donoghue	East Kerry	1-32	35	6	5.83
2	Pa O'Sullivan	Laune Rangers	0-26	26	5	5.20
3	Dara Ó Cinnéide	West Kerry	1-15	18	4	4.50
4	Eoin Moynihan	Austin Stacks	0-15	15	3	5.00
5	Ian Twiss	Mid Kerry	0-14	14	3	4.66
6	John Kennedy	Shannon Rangers	1-10	13	3	4.33
7	Seán Geaney	West Kerry	3-03	12	4	3.00
7	Darren Aherne	Austin Stacks	0-12	12	3	4.00
9	Jerry Murphy	East Kerry	1-08	11	6	1.83
10	Gary McGrath	Mid Kerry	2-04	10	3	3.33
10	Tom O'Connell	Mid Kerry	0-10	10	2	5.00

In a single game

Rank	Player	Club	Tally	Total	Opposition
1	Paud O'Donoghue	East Kerry	0-10	10	St. Brendan's
2	John Kennedy	Shannon Rangers	1-05	8	Killarney Legion
3	Paud O'Donoghue	East Kerry	1-04	7	Laune Rangers
3	Eoin Moynihan	Austin Stacks	0-07	7	East Kerry
3	Darren Aherne	Austin Stacks	0-07	7	Feale Rangers
3	Pa O'Sullivan	Laune Rangers	0-07	7	Kenmare
3	Pa O'Sullivan	Laune Rangers	0-07	7	St. Kieran's
8	Gary McGrath	Mid Kerry	2-00	6	Dr. Crokes
8	Seán Geaney	West Kerry	2-00	6	Laune Rangers
8	Cathal O'Grady	Killarney Legion	0-06	6	Shannon Rangers
8	Ian Twiss	Mid Kerry	0-06	6	Dr. Crokes
8	Dara Ó Cinnéide	West Kerry	0-06	6	Castleisland Desmonds
8	Ian Twiss	Mid Kerry	0-06	6	West Kerry
8	Pa O'Sullivan	Laune Rangers	0-06	6	West Kerry
8	Paud O'Donoghue	East Kerry	0-06	6	Laune Rangers

=== Miscellaneous ===
- East Kerry win the title for the first time in 27 years.
- The final goes to a replay for the first time since 1994.
