= 1968 Kerry Senior Football Championship =

Gaelic football competition

- Teams: 12
- Champions: East Kerry (2nd title); Weeshie Fogarty (captain)
- Runners-up: Waterville

The 1968 Kerry Senior Football Championship was the 68th staging of the Kerry Senior Football Championship since its establishment by the Kerry County Board in 1889.

Mid Kerry entered the championship as the defending champions, however, they were beaten by East Kerry in the semi-finals.

The final was played on 1 November 1968 at Austin Stack Park in Tralee, between East Kerry and Waterville, in what was their first ever meeting in the final. East Kerry won the match by 6-08 to 1-09 to claim their second championship title overall and a first title in three years.

== Results ==
=== Final ===
1 November 1968 Final	East Kerry	6-08 - 1-09	Waterville	Austin Stack Park
	T Long 4-0, J Culloty 0-4, M Lyne 1-0, DJ Crowley 1-0, J Saunders 0-3, P Moynihan 0-1.		M O'Dwyer 0-5, D Courtney 1-0, M O'Connell 0-1, K Donnelly 0-1, G Cronin 0-1.

== Championship statistics ==
=== Miscellaneous ===
- Waterville qualify for the final for the first time.
