= 1976 Kerry Senior Football Championship =

Gaelic football competition

- Dates: 27 June - 3 October 1976
- Teams: 17
- Champions: Austin Stacks (8th title); John O'Keeffe (captain)
- Runners-up: Kenmare; Mickey Ned O'Sullivan (captain)

Tournament statistics
- Matches played: 18
- Goals scored: 53 (2.94 per match)
- Points scored: 314 (17.44 per match)

The 1976 Kerry Senior Football Championship was the 76th staging of the Kerry Senior Football Championship since its establishment by the Kerry County Board in 1889. The championship ran from 27 June to 3 October 1976.

Austin Stacks entered the championship as the defending champions.

The final was played on 3 October 1976 at FitzGerald Stadium in Killarney, between Austin Stacks and Kenmare, in what was their first ever meeting in the final. Austin Stacks won the match by 1-14 to 0-07 to claim their eighth championship title overall and a second successive title.

== Teams ==
17 teams participated in the championship. Austin Stacks, Feale Rangers, Shannon Rangers, Kenmare and Mid Kerry were seeded at received byes to the quarter-finals. The other 12 teams played off in the early rounds.

== Results ==
=== Round 1 ===
27 June 1976 Round 1	South Kerry	1-09 - 2-04	Laune Rangers	Con Keating Park
			T Doyle 1-0, D Falvey 1-0, F Russell 0-2, B Harmond 0-1, J Clifford 0-1.

27 June 1976 Round 1	Dingle	3-11 - 1-09	Castlegregory	Páirc an Aghasaigh
	O Phair 2-1, G Dillon 0-4, JM Graham 1-0, J O'Sullivan 0-3, V O'Connor 0-2, M O'Connor 0-1.		J Courtney 0-7, J O'Flaherty 1-0, G Murphy 0-1, T Moriarty 0-1.

27 June 1976 Round 1	West Kerry	0-12 - 0-07	John Mitchels	Páirc an Aghasaigh
	G Walsh 0-4, L Higgins 0-3, T Doyle 0-2, T Sayers 0-2, P Ó Sé 0-1.		J Prendergast 0-2, J O'Dowd 0-2, P Kerins 0-1, D O'Shea 0-1, J O'Shea 0-1.

27 June 1976 Round 1	Kerins O'Rahilly's	2-08 - 1-08	Waterville	Austin Stack Park
	S Kissane 1-2, J McMahon 1-1, C O'Connor 0-4, F Slattery 0-1.		D Moran 1-0, F Courtney 0-3, D Courtney 0-2, J Galvin 0-2, J O'Shea 0-1.

27 June 1976 Round 1	Eoghan Ruadh	1-10 - 1-09	Spa	FitzGerald Stadium
	J Saunders 1-2, H Moynihan 0-3, J Kerins 0-2, J Cahill 0-1, S Cooper 0-1, J Cahill 0-1.		S Kelleher 1-3, P Cronin 0-2, T Regan 0-2, M Gleeson 0-1, C Doolan 0-1.

27 June 1976 Round 1	Castleisland Desmonds	6-07 - 3-10	East Kerry	Castleisland Grounds
	P Horan 4-1, E O'Connor 1-4, P O'Connor 1-0, D McCarthy 0-1, T Lynch 0-1.		F Bartlett 2-4, N Brosnan 1-1, T Lyne 0-1, S Kennedy 0-1, T Looney 0-1, P O'Connor 0-1, M Lyne 0-1.

=== Round 2 ===
13 July 1976 Round 2	South Kerry	0-12 - 1-09	West Kerry	Páirc de Burca
	J Egan 0-6, P O'Mahony 0-2, G O'Driscoll 0-2, J O'Mahony 0-1, JJ Byrne 0-1.		P Ó Sé 0-5, T Fitzgerald 1-0, L Higgins 0-1, J Ashe 0-1, T Sayers 0-1, S Fitgerald 0-1.

13 July 1976 Round 2	Kerins O'Rahilly's	1-08 - 0-08	Castelisland Desmonds	FitzGerald Stadium
	P Kissane 1-2, F Slattery 0-2, S Walsh 0-2, S Hoare 0-1, A O'Sullivan 0-1.		E O'Connor 0-3, M O'Connor 0-2, T Murphy 0-1, P Horan 0-1, J Lyons 0-1.

13 July 1976 Round 2	Eoghan Ruadh	3-05 - 3-02	Dingle	Austin Stack Park
	J Cahill 2-0, J McCarthy 1-2, D Moynihan 0-1, D Murphy 0-1, J O'Sullivan 0-1.		G Dillon 2-0, M O'Connor 1-0, V O'Connor 0-1, B O'Sullivan 0-1.

30 July 1976 Round 2 replay	South Kerry	4-08 - 0-10	West Kerry	Páirc de Burca
	P Egan 1-1, J O'Mahony 1-0, D O'Dwyer 1-0, T Lyne 1-0, J Egan 0-3, J O'Connor 0-2, J O'Shea 0-1, G O'Driscoll 0-1.		T Doyle 0-5, P Ó Sé 0-2, G Casey 0-1, L Higgins 0-1, S Fitzgerald 0-1.

=== Quarter-finals ===
20 August 1976 Quarter-final	Shannon Rangers	1-11 - 0-10	Mid Kerry	Austin Stack Park
	J Walsh 0-5, O Moran 1-0, B Walsh 0-3, E Liston 0-2, G Griffin 0-1.		B Lynch 0-6, M O'Grady 0-2, P Lynch 0-1, D O'Sullivan 0-1.

21 August 1976 Quarter-final	Austin Stacks	2-10 - 1-03	Eoghan Ruadh	FitzGerald Stadium
	M Sheehy 2-5, B Curtin 0-2, D Long 0-1, JL McElligott 0-1, J O'Keeffe 0-1.		J Kelly 1-0, H Moynihan 0-2, J McCarthy 0-1.

21 August 1976 Quarter-final	Kenmare	0-08 - 0-08 (abandoned)	Feale Rangers	FitzGerald Stadium

22 August 1976 Quarter-final	South Kerry	3-06 - 2-09	Kerins O'Rahilly's	J. P. O'Sullivan Park
	J Egan 2-2, C O'Connell 1-0, J O'Shea 0-2, P Egan 0-1, D O'Dwyer 0-1.		A O'Sullivan 1-3, S Kissane 1-2, C O'Connor 0-2, D Spring 0-2.

29 August 1976 Quarter-final replay	South Kerry	2-10 - 2-06	Kerins O'Rahilly's	J. P. O'Sullivan Park
	J Egan 0-6, D O'Dwyer 1-0, T Lyne 1-0, C O'Connell 0-2, P Egan 0-1, J O'Shea 0-1.		J McMahon 1-0, S Walsh 1-0, A O'Sullivan 0-3, S Kissane 0-2, P Kissane 0-1.

29 August 1976 Quarter-final replay	Kenmare	0-10 - 0-07	Feale Rangers	FitzGerald Stadium
	M Spillane 0-3, P Finnegan 0-3, P Spillane 0-2, P O'Neill 0-1, D O'Sullivan 0-1.		P Mulvihill 0-4, P O'Connell 0-1, E Fitzmaurice 0-1, T O'Sullivan 0-1.

=== Semi-finals ===
28 August 1976 Semi-final	Austin Stacks	3-13 - 1-06	Shannon Rangers	Austin Stack Park
	M Sheehy 1-5, D Long 1-2, B Curtin 1-1, JL McElligott 0-2, T Sheehan 0-1, J O'Keeffe 0-1, P McCarthy 0-1.		E Liston 1-2, J Walsh 0-2, E O'Donoghue 0-1, O Moran 0-1.

5 September 1976 Semi-final	Kenmare	1-15 - 1-11	South Kerry	FitzGerald Stadium
	P Finnegan 1-7, P Spillane 0-4, D O'Sullivan 0-1, M Murphy 0-1, PJ McIntyre 0-1, D O'Connor 0-1.		G Egan 0-6, G O'Driscoll 1-1, M O'Connell 0-3, P O'Mahony 0-1.

=== Final ===
3 October 1976 Final	Austin Stacks	1-14 - 0-07	Kenmare	FitzGerald Stadium
	M Sheehy 0-5, J Power 1-0, D Long 0-3, P McCarthy 0-2, T Sheehan 0-1, B Curtin 0-1, JL McElligott 0-1, J O'Keeffe 0-1.		P Finnegan 0-3, P Spillane 0-2, M Spillane 0-1, M O'Sullivan 0-1.

== Championship statistics ==
=== Miscellaneous ===
- The semi-final between Kenmare and Feale Rangers was abandoned by referee Buddy O'Grady, with nine minutes of actual playing time left. The decision was taken after a series of fracas between the players.
