= 1987 Kerry Senior Football Championship =

Gaelic football competition

- Champions: Kenmare (2nd title); Tom O'Sullivan (captain); P. J. McIntyre (manager)
- Runners-up: Dr. Crokes; John Clifford (captain); Eddie O'Sullivan (manager)

The 1987 Kerry Senior Football Championship was the 87th staging of the Kerry Senior Football Championship since its establishment by the Kerry County Board in 1889.

Austin Stacks entered the championship as the defending champions.

The final replay was played on 4 October 1987 at Austin Stack Park in Tralee, between Kenmare and Dr. Crokes, in what was their first ever meeting in the final. Kenmare won the match by 3-10 to 0-18 to claim their second championship title overall and a first title in 13 years.

== Results ==
=== Final ===
27 September 1987 Final	Kenmare	1-07 - 2-04	Dr. Crokes	Austin Stack Park

4 October 1987 Final replay	Kenmare	3-10 - 0-18	Dr. Crokes	Austin Stack Park

== Championship statistics ==
=== Miscellaneous ===
- Kenmare District win their first title since 1974
- Dr. Crokes quality for the final for the first time since 1914
