= 1975 Kerry Senior Football Championship =

Gaelic football competition

- Teams: 15
- Champions: Austin Stacks (7th title); Jo Jo Barrett (captain)
- Runners-up: Mid Kerry

The 1975 Kerry Senior Football Championship was the 75th staging of the Kerry Senior Football Championship since its establishment by the Kerry County Board in 1889.

Kenmare entered the championship as the defending champions.

The final was played on 16 November 1975 at FitzGerald Stadium in Killarney, between Austin Stacks and Mid Kerry, in what was their first ever meeting in the final. Austin Stacks won the match by 1–07 to 1–04 to claim their seventh championship title overall and a first title in two years.

== Results ==
=== Final ===
19 October 1975 Final	Austin Stacks	2-07 - 2-07	Mid Kerry	FitzGerald Stadium
	M Sheehy 2-4, J O'Keeffe 0-1, D Long 0-1, T Kennington 0-1.		M O'Grady 1-1, P Lynch 0-4, M Breen 1-0, T Prendergast 0-1, W Murphy 0-1.

16 November 1975 Final replay	Austin Stacks	1-07 - 1-04	Mid Kerry	FitzGerald Stadium
	G Power 1-1, T Kennington 0-2, M Sheehy 0-2, JJ Barrett 0-1, J Power 0-1.		B Lynch 1-2, P Lynch 0-1, K Griffin 0-1.
