= 1933 Kerry Senior Football Championship =

Gaelic football competition

- Dates: April - 5 November 1933
- Teams: 6
- Champions: Strand Street (1st title); Dan Joe Crowley (captain)
- Runners-up: Rock Street

The 1933 Kerry Senior Football Championship was the 35th staging of the Kerry Senior Football Championship since its establishment by the Kerry County Board in 1889.

Rock Street entered the championship as the defending champions in search of a fourth consecutive title.

The final was played on 5 November 1933 at Austin Stack Park in Tralee, between Strand Street and Rock Street, in what was their third meeting in the final and a first in three years. Strand Street won the match by 5–05 to 0–05 to claim their first ever championship title.

== Results ==
=== Final ===
5 November 1933 Final	Strand Street	5-05 - 0-05	Rock Street	Austin Stack Park

== Championship statistics ==
=== Miscellaneous ===
- Strand Street win the title for the first time.
- Rock Street become the first, and to date only, club to qualify for the final six years in a row.
