= 1984 Kerry Senior Football Championship =

Gaelic football competition

- Teams: 16
- Champions: West Kerry (1st title); Gabriel Casey (captain)
- Runners-up: South Kerry

The 1984 Kerry Senior Football Championship was the 84th staging of the Kerry Senior Football Championship since its establishment by the Kerry County Board in 1889.

Killarney entered the championship as the defending champions.

The final was played on 7 October 1984 at Austin Stack Park in Tralee, between West Kerry and South Kerry, in what was their first ever meeting in the final. West Kerry won the match by 1–07 to 1–06 to claim their first ever championship title.

== Results ==
=== Final ===
7 October 1984 Final	West Kerry	1-07 - 1-06	South Kerry	Austin Stack Park

== Championship statistics ==
=== Miscellaneous ===
- West Kerry qualify for the final for the first time since 1967.
- West Kerry win the title for the first time.
