= 1979 Kerry Senior Football Championship =

Gaelic football competition

- Teams: 17
- Champions: Austin Stacks (9th title); Ger Power (captain)
- Runners-up: Castleisland

The 1979 Kerry Senior Football Championship was the 79th staging of the Kerry Senior Football Championship since its establishment by the Kerry County Board in 1889.

Feale Rangers entered the championship as the defending champions.

The final was played on 23 September 1979 at Austin Stack Park in Tralee, between Austin Stacks and Castleisland, in what was their first ever meeting in the final. Austin Stacks won the match by 1-11 to 0-09 to claim their ninth championship title overall and a first title in three years.

== Results ==
=== Final ===
23 September 1979 Final	Austin Stacks	1-11 - 0-09	Castleisland	Austin Stack Park
