= 1916 Kerry Senior Football Championship =

Gaelic football competition

- Dates: October 1916 – 27 January 1917
- Teams: 10

The 1916 Kerry Senior Football Championship was the 23rd staging of the Kerry Senior Football Championship since its establishment by the Kerry County Board in 1889. The championship began in October 1916 but was suspended without a conclusion on 27 January 1917.

Dr Crokes entered the championship as the defending champions

== Suspension ==
The championship was curtailed when the Great Southern and Western Railway cancelled all train arrangements for matches due to be played on 19 November 1916. A number of matches had already been played, including a drawn encounter between Laune Rangers and Killarney Crokes. A County Board meeting decided to postpone some games, however, a subsequent meeting on 27 January 1917 carried a motion "that, in consequence of the suspension of Sunday railway facilities, we hereby discontinue the 1916 Co. Hurling and Football Championships".
