= 1977 Kerry Senior Football Championship =

Gaelic football competition

- Teams: 15
- Champions: Shannon Rangers (5th title); Jackie Walsh (captain)
- Runners-up: Feale Rangers; Johnny Mulvihill (captain)

The 1977 Kerry Senior Football Championship was the 77th staging of the Kerry Senior Football Championship since its establishment by the Kerry County Board in 1889.

Austin Stacks entered the championship as the defending champions.

The final was played on 9 October 1977 at Austin Stack Park in Tralee, between Shannon Rangers and Feale Rangers, in what was their first ever meeting in the final. Shannon Rangers won the match by 0-10 to 0-06 to claim their fifth championship title overall and a first title in five years.

== Results ==
=== Final ===
9 October 1977 Final	Shannon Rangers	0-10 - 0-06	Feale Rangers	Austin Stack Park
	D Moran 0-2, E Liston 0-2, B Walsh 0-2, P Liston 0-1, J Walsh 0-1, M Keane 0-1.		J Mulvihill 0-2, J Deenihan 0-1, T Bridgeman 0-1, G O'Sullivan 0-1, R Bunyan 0-1.
