= 1972 Kerry Senior Football Championship =

Gaelic football competition

1971 Kerry Senior Football Championship
- Teams: 15
- Champions: Shannon Rangers (4th title); Paud O'Donoghue (captain)
- Runners-up: Mid Kerry

The 1972 Kerry Senior Football Championship was the 72nd staging of the Kerry Senior Football Championship since its establishment by the Kerry County Board in 1889.

Mid Kerry entered the championship as the defending champions.

The final was played on 5 November 1972 at Austin Stack Park in Tralee, between Shannon Rangers and Mid Kerry, in what was their first ever meeting in the final. Shannon Rangers won the match by 2–08 to 1–07 to claim their fourth championship title overall and a first title in eight years.

== Results ==
=== Final ===
5 November 1972 Final	Shannon Rangers	2-08 - 1-07	Mid Kerry	Austin Stack Park
	J Walsh 1-1, E O'Donoghue 1-0, B McCarthy 0-3, J Bunyan 0-2, D Kissane 0-2.		B Lynch 0-6, W Murphy 1-0, P Lynch 0-1.
