= 1985 Kerry Senior Football Championship =

Gaelic football competition

- Teams: 16
- Champions: West Kerry (2nd title); Denis Higgins (captain)
- Runners-up: Feale Rangers; John Horgan (captain)

The 1985 Kerry Senior Football Championship was the 85th staging of the Kerry Senior Football Championship since its establishment by the Kerry County Board in 1889.

West Kerry entered the championship as the defending champions.

The final was played on 20 October 1985 at Austin Stack Park in Tralee, between West Kerry and Feale Rangers, in what was their first ever meeting in the final. West Kerry won the match by 0-11 to 1-05 to claim their second championship title overall and a second consecutive title.

== Results ==
=== Final ===
20 October 1985 Final	West Kerry	0-11 - 1-05	Feale Rangers	Austin Stack Park
