= 1966 Kerry Senior Football Championship =

Gaelic football competition

- Teams: 12
- Champions: John Mitchels (10th title); Séamus Roche (captain)
- Runners-up: East Kerry

The 1966 Kerry Senior Football Championship was the 66th staging of the Kerry Senior Football Championship since its establishment by the Kerry County Board in 1889.

East Kerry entered the championship as the defending champions.

The final was played on 2 November 1966 at Austin Stack Park in Tralee, between John Mitchels and East Kerry, in what was their first ever meeting in the final. John Mitchels won the match by 2–10 to 1–10 to claim their 10th championship title overall and a first title in three years. It remains their last championship title.

== Results ==
=== Final ===
2 November 1966 Final	John Mitchels	2-10 - 1-10	East Kerry	Austin Stack Park
