= 1969 Kerry Senior Football Championship =

Gaelic football competition

- Teams: 12
- Champions: East Kerry (3rd title)
- Runners-up: Waterville

The 1969 Kerry Senior Football Championship was the 69th staging of the Kerry Senior Football Championship since its establishment by the Kerry County Board in 1889.

East Kerry entered the championship as the defending champions.

The final was played on 7 December 1969 at Austin Stack Park in Tralee, between East Kerry and Waterville, in what was their second consecutive meeting in the final. East Kerry won the match by 2-07 to 1-08 to claim their third championship title overall and a second title in succession.

== Results ==
=== Final ===
7 December 1969 Final	East Kerry	2-07 - 1-08	Waterville	Austin Stack Park
