= 1988 Kerry Senior Football Championship =

Gaelic football competition

- Dates: 18 June - 2 October 1988
- Teams: 19
- Champions: St. Kieran's (1st title); Timmy Brosnan (captain); John McNally (manager)
- Runners-up: Dr. Crokes; Liam Hartnett (captain); Denis O'Leary (manager)

The 1988 Kerry Senior Football Championship was the 88th staging of the Kerry Senior Football Championship since its establishment by the Kerry County Board in 1889. The championship ran from 18 June to 2 October 1988.

Kenmare entered the championship as the defending champions.

The final was played on 2 October 1988 at Austin Stack Park in Tralee, between St. Kieran's and Dr. Crokes, in what was their first ever meeting in the final. St. Kieran's won the match by 0-10 to 0-03 to claim their first ever championship title.

== Results ==
=== Final ===
2 October 1988 Final	St. Kieran's	0-10 - 0-03	Dr. Crokes	Austin Stack Park
				Referee: T Sugrue (St. Pat's, Blennerville)

== Championship statistics ==
=== Miscellaneous ===
- St. Kieran's won their first ever title, having qualified for the final for the first time in their history.
