= 1983 Kerry Senior Football Championship =

Gaelic football competition

- Teams: 16
- Champions: Killarney (2nd title)
- Runners-up: Feale Rangers

The 1983 Kerry Senior Football Championship was the 83rd staging of the Kerry Senior Football Championship since its establishment by the Kerry County Board in 1889.

South Kerry entered the championship as the defending champions.

The final replay was played on 16 October 1983 at Austin Stack Park in Tralee, between Killarney and Feale Rangers, in what was their first ever meeting in the final. Killarney won the match by 0-10 to 1-04 to claim their second championship title overall and a first title in 34 years.

== Results ==
=== Final ===
2 October 1982 Final	Killarney	1-05 - 1-05	Feale Rangers	Austin Stack Park

16 October 1982 Final replay	Killarney	0-10 - 1-04	Feale Rangers	Austin Stack Park

== Championship statistics ==
=== Miscellaneous ===
- Killaney win their first title since 1949.
- Killaney qualify for the final for first time since 1950.
