= 1971 Kerry Senior Football Championship =

Gaelic football competition

- Teams: 14
- Champions: Mid Kerry (2nd title); Jim Foley (captain)
- Runners-up: Shannon Rangers

The 1971 Kerry Senior Football Championship was the 71st staging of the Kerry Senior Football Championship since its establishment by the Kerry County Board in 1889.

East Kerry entered the championship as the defending champions in search of a fourth successive title.

The final was played on 24 October 1971 at Austin Stack Park in Tralee, between Mid Kerry and Shannon Rangers, in what was their first ever meeting in the final. Mid Kerry won the match by 0–12 to 1–06 to claim their second championship title overall and a first title in four years.

== Results ==
=== Final ===
17 October 1971 Final	Mid Kerry	2-12 - 4-06	Shannon Rangers	Austin Stack Park
	B Lynch 0-7, P Griffin 1-1, M O'Grady 1-1, P Lynch 0-1, J Foley 0-1, D O'Shea 0-1.		J Walsh 1-5, M Walsh 1-0, S Hilliard 1-0, J Bunyan 1-0, B McCarthy 0-1.

24 October 1971 Final replay	Mid Kerry	0-12 - 1-06	Shannon Rangers	Austin Stack Park
	B Lynch 0-5, D O'Shea 0-3, K Griffin 0-2, T Kelleher 0-1, P Lynch 0-1.		J Walsh 0-3, P O'Connell 1-0, B McCarthy 0-2, R Bambury 0-1.
