= 1932 Kerry Senior Football Championship =

Gaelic football competition

- Teams: 6
- Champions: Rock Street (4th title); Joe Barrett (captain)
- Runners-up: North Kerry

The 1932 Kerry Senior Football Championship was the 34th staging of the Kerry Senior Football Championship since its establishment by the Kerry County Board in 1889.

Rock Street entered the championship as the defending champions.

The final was played on 9 October 1932 at Tralee Sportsfield, between Rock Street and North Kerry, in what was their first ever meeting in the final. Rock Street won the match by 2–03 to 1–05 to claim their fourth championship title overall and a third title in succession.

== Results ==
=== Final ===
9 October 1932 Final	Rock Street	2-03 - 1-05	North Kerry	Tralee Sportsfield

== Championship statistics ==
=== Miscellaneous ===
- Rock Street become the first club side to win three titles in a row since Dr Crokes between 1912 and 1914. They become the first since Tralee Division between 1925–27 to win three titles in a row.
- North Kerry qualify for the final for the first time.
