= 1962 Kerry Senior Football Championship =

Gaelic football competition

- Teams: 12
- Champions: John Mitchels (9th title); Teddy O'Dowd (captain)
- Runners-up: Shannon Rangers

The 1962 Kerry Senior Football Championship was the 62nd staging of the Kerry Senior Football Championship since its establishment by the Kerry County Board in 1889.

John Mitchels entered the championship as the defending champions.

The final was played on 11 November 1962 between John Mitchels and Feale Rangers, in what was their second meeting in the final and a first meeting in three years. John Mitchels won the match by 1–09 to 0–05 to claim their eighth championship title overall and a record-breaking fourth title in succession.

== Championship statistics ==
=== Miscellaneous ===
- John Mitchels become the first club to win four titles in a row.
