= 1931 Kerry Senior Football Championship =

Gaelic football competition

- Teams: 6
- Champions: Rock Street (3rd title); Joe Barrett (captain)
- Runners-up: Boherbee

The 1931 Kerry Senior Football Championship was the 33rd staging of the Kerry Senior Football Championship since its establishment by the Kerry County Board in 1889.

Rock Street entered the championship as the defending champions.

The final was played on 10 January 1932 at Tralee Sportsfield, between Rock Street and Boherbee, in what was their second meeting in the final and a first in two years. Rock Street won the match by 2–07 to 1–03 to claim their third championship title overall and a second title in succession.

== Results ==
=== Final ===
10 January 1932 Final	Rock Street	2-07 - 1-03	Boherbee	Tralee Sportsfield

== Championship statistics ==
=== Miscellaneous ===
- Rock Street win the double for the second time in three seasons by also winning the Kerry Senior Hurling Championship.
