= 1930 Kerry Senior Football Championship =

Gaelic football competition

- Teams: 7
- Champions: Rock Street (2nd title); Joe Barrett (captain)
- Runners-up: Strand Street

The 1930 Kerry Senior Football Championship was the 32nd staging of the Kerry Senior Football Championship since its establishment by the Kerry County Board in 1889.

Boherbee entered the championship as the defending champions.

The final was played on 14 September 1930 at Tralee Sportsfield, between Rock Street and Strand Street, in what was their second meeting in the final and a first in two years. Rock Street won the match by 4–04 to 2–05 to claim their second championship title overall and a first title in two years.

== Results ==
=== Final ===
14 September 1930 Final	Rock Street	4-04 - 2-05	Strand Street	Tralee Sportsfield
