= 1965 Kerry Senior Football Championship =

Gaelic football competition

- Teams: 13
- Champions: East Kerry (1st title); Donal Lynch (captain)
- Runners-up: Mid Kerry

The 1965 Kerry Senior Football Championship was the 65th staging of the Kerry Senior Football Championship since its establishment by the Kerry County Board in 1889.

Shannon Rangers entered the championship as the defending champions, however, they were beaten by John Mitchels in the first round.

The final was played on 1 November 1965 between East Kerry and Mid Kerry, in what was their first ever meeting in the final. East Kerry won the match by 0-10 to 0-04 to claim their first ever championship title.

== Results ==
=== Final ===
10 October 1965 Final	East Kerry	4-05 - 2-11	Mid Kerry	Austin Stack Park

1 November 1965 Final replay	East Kerry	0-10 - 0-04	Mid Kerry	Austin Stack Park

== Championship statistics ==
=== Miscellaneous ===
- East Kerry win their first title.
- Mid Kerry qualify for the final for the first time.
