= 1963 Kerry Senior Football Championship =

Gaelic football competition

- Teams: 13
- Champions: John Mitchels (9th title); Brian Sheehy (captain)
- Runners-up: Kerins O'Rahilly's

The 1963 Kerry Senior Football Championship was the 63rd staging of the Kerry Senior Football Championship since its establishment by the Kerry County Board in 1889.

John Mitchels entered the championship as the defending champions.

The final was played on 29 September 1963 between John Mitchels and Kerins O'Rahilly's, in what was their second meeting in the final and a first in two years. John Mitchels won the match by 4-04 to 2-03 to claim their ninth championship title overall and a record-breaking fifth title in succession.

== Results ==
=== Final ===
29 September 1963 Final	John Mitchels	4-04 - 2-03	Kerins O'Rahilly's	Austin Stack Park

== Championship statistics ==
=== Miscellaneous ===
- John Mitchels beat their own record to become the first club to win five titles in a row.
- Paudie Sheehy wins a record 6th County SFC title. A record that stood until 2017.
