= 1970 Kerry Senior Football Championship =

Gaelic football competition

- Teams: 15
- Champions: East Kerry (4th title); Mick Gleeson (captain)
- Runners-up: Waterville

The 1970 Kerry Senior Football Championship was the 70th staging of the Kerry Senior Football Championship since its establishment by the Kerry County Board in 1889.

East Kerry entered the championship as the defending champions.

The final was played on 4 October 1970 at Austin Stack Park in Tralee, between East Kerry and Waterville, in what was their third successive meeting in the final. East Kerry won the match by 1-15 to 0-15 to claim their fourth championship title overall and a third title in succession.

== Results ==
=== Final ===
4 October 1970 Final	East Kerry	1-15 - 0-15	Waterville	Austin Stack Park
	J Culloty 0-9, P Moynihan 1-1, M Gleeson 0-2, D Crowley 0-1, P Donoghue 0-1, D Kelleher 0-1.		M O'Dwyer 0-9, M O'Connell 0-3, S Clifford 0-1, J O'Shea 0-1, D Courtney 0-1.

=== Miscellaneous ===
- East Kerry win three titles in a row for the first time.
- East Kerry are the first divisional side to win three titles in a row.
- East Kerry and Waterville face each other in the final for the third year in a row.
- Waterville become the first side to lose three finals in a row.
- Laune Rangers return to the senior championship, as a single club, for the first time since 1919.
