= 1967 Kerry Senior Football Championship =

Gaelic football competition

- Teams: 12
- Champions: Mid Kerry (1st title); Pat Ahern (captain)
- Runners-up: West Kerry; Timmy Fitzgerald (captain)

The 1967 Kerry Senior Football Championship was the 67th staging of the Kerry Senior Football Championship since its establishment by the Kerry County Board in 1889.

John Mitchels entered the championship as the defending champions. However, they were beaten by Mid Kerry in the quarter-finals.

The final was played on 5 November 1967 at Austin Stack Park in Tralee, between Mid Kerry and West Kerry, in what was their first-ever meeting in the final. Mid Kerry won the match by 0–12 to 2–04 to claim their first-ever championship title.

== Results ==
=== Semi-finals ===
15 October 1967 Semi-final	West Kerry	3-07 - 0-08	East Kerry	Austin Stack Park

22 October 1967 Semi-final	Mid Kerry	0-11 - 1-06	Shannon Rangers	Austin Stack Park

=== Final ===
5 November 1967 Final	Mid Kerry	0-12 - 2-04	West Kerry	Austin Stack Park
	P Griffin 0-5, P Ahern 0-4, B Lynch 0-2, T Prendergast 0-1.		T McDonnell 1-0, B Hughes 1-0, T Kelleher 0-3, T Fitzgerald 0-1.	Referee: F Halbert (Cork)

== Championship statistics ==
=== Miscellaneous ===
- Mid Kerry win the title for the first time.
- West Kerry qualify for the final for the first time since 1960.
