= 1982 Kerry Senior Football Championship =

Gaelic football competition

- Teams: 16
- Champions: South Kerry (5th title); Brendan Murphy (captain)
- Runners-up: Feale Rangers; Tim Kennelly (captain)

The 1982 Kerry Senior Football Championship was the 82nd staging of the Kerry Senior Football Championship since its establishment by the Kerry County Board in 1889.

South Kerry entered the championship as the defending champions.

The final was played on 17 October 1982 at Austin Stack Park in Tralee, between South Kerry and Feale Rangers, in what was their first ever meeting in the final. South Kerry won the match by 0–07 to 0–05 to claim their fifth championship title overall and a second consecutive title.

== Results ==
=== Final ===
17 October 1982 Final	South Kerry	0-07 - 0-05	Feale Rangers	Austin Stack Park
