= 1978 Kerry Senior Football Championship =

Gaelic football competition

- Teams: 15
- Champions: Feale Rangers (1st title); Johnny Wren (captain)
- Runners-up: Mid Kerry

The 1978 Kerry Senior Football Championship was the 78th staging of the Kerry Senior Football Championship since its establishment by the Kerry County Board in 1889.

Shannon Rangers entered the championship as the defending champions.

The final was played on 12 November 1978 at Austin Stack Park in Tralee, between Feale Rangers and Mid Kerry, in what was their first ever meeting in the final. Feale Rangers won the match by 0-08 to 0-03 to claim their first ever championship title.

== Results ==
=== Final ===
12 November 1978 Final	Feale Rangers	0-08 - 0-03	Mid Kerry	Austin Stack Park
