= 1913 Kerry Senior Football Championship =

Gaelic football competition

- Teams: 19
- Champions: Dr. Crokes (3rd title)
- Runners-up: Kilcummin

The 1913 Kerry Senior Football Championship was the 21st staging of the Kerry Senior Football Championship since its establishment by the Kerry County Board in 1889.

Dr. Crokes entered the championship as the defending champions.

The final was played on 18 January 1914, between Dr. Crokes and Kilcummin, in what was their first ever meeting in the final. Dr. Crokes won the match by 3–01 to 1–00 to claim their third championship title overall and a second title in succession.

== Results ==
=== Final ===
18 January 1914 Final	Dr. Crokes	3-01 - 1-00	Kilcummin

== Championship statistics ==
=== Miscellaneous ===
- Kilcummin qualify for the final for the first time since 1903.
