= 1928 Kerry Senior Football Championship =

Gaelic football competition

- Teams: 11
- Champions: Rock Street (1st title); Joe Barrett (captain)
- Runners-up: Strand Road

The 1928 Kerry Senior Football Championship was the 30th staging of the Kerry Senior Football Championship since its establishment by the Kerry County Board in 1889.

Tralee were the defending champions, however, the team disbanded, resulting in the creation of three new teams: Boherbee, Rock Street and Strand Road.

The final was a Tralee derby, played between Rock Street and Strand Road, in what was their first ever meeting in the final. Rock Street won the match by 3–04 to 0–07 to claim their first ever championship title.

== Teams ==
As decided by Co. Convention, eleven teams took part in the Co. Senior Football Championship, Killarney, Currow, Strand Road, Rock Street, Boherbue, South Kerry, Newtownsandes, Listowel, Craughdarrig and Dingle. Laune Rangers, who had absorbed the best from Fossa, Firies, Milltown and Castlemaine, as well as Killorglin.

== Results ==
=== Final ===
Final	Rock Street	1-02 - 1-00	Strand Road

=== Miscellaneous ===
- Rock Street won the title for the first time.
- Rock Street also won the Kerry Senior Hurling Championship making them the first club to win the double since Tralee Mitchels in 1908.
- Strand Road qualify for the final for the first time.
