= 1974 Kerry Senior Football Championship =

Gaelic football competition

- Teams: 14
- Champions: Kenmare (1st title); Michael Murphy (captain)
- Runners-up: Shannon Rangers

The 1974 Kerry Senior Football Championship was the 74th staging of the Kerry Senior Football Championship since its establishment by the Kerry County Board in 1889.

Austin Stacks entered the championship as the defending champions.

The final was played on 3 November 1974 at Austin Stack Park in Tralee, between Kenmare and Shannon Rangers, in what was their first ever meeting in the final. Kenmare won the match by 2-12 to 1-05 to claim their first ever championship title.

== Results ==
=== Final ===
3 November 1974 Final	Kenmare District	2-12 - 1-05	Shannon Rangers	Austin Stack Park
	P Spillane 0-4, PJ McIntyre 0-4, M Murphy 1-0, P O'Sullivan 1-0, BM O'Sullivan 0-3, D O'Sullivan 0-1.		B McCarthy 1-0, J Walsh 0-3, O Moran 0-1, D Bambury 0-1.

== Championship statistics ==
=== Miscellaneous ===
- Kenmare District win the title for the first time.
