= 1912 Kerry Senior Football Championship =

Gaelic football competition

- Teams: 18
- Champions: Dr. Crokes (2nd title)
- Runners-up: Tralee Parnells

The 1912 Kerry Senior Football Championship was the 20th staging of the Kerry Senior Football Championship since its establishment by the Kerry County Board in 1889.

Laune Rangers entered the championship as the defending champions, however, they were beaten by Dr. Crokes in the first round.

The final was played on 22 December 1912, between Dr. Crokes and Tralee Parnells, in what was their first ever meeting in the final. Dr. Crokes won the match by 1–06 to no score to claim their second championship title overall and a first title in 11 years.

== Results ==
=== Final ===
22 December 1912 Final	Dr. Crokes	1-06 - 0-00	Tralee Parnells	Listowel Grounds
