= Kerry Senior Football Championship =

Annual Gaelic football competition

- Current season or competition: 2026 Kerry Senior Football Championship
- Irish: Craobh Sinsear Peile Chiarraí
- Code: Gaelic football
- Founded: 1889; 137 years ago
- Region: Kerry (GAA)
- Trophy: Bishop Moynihan Cup
- No. of teams: 17 (9 clubs) (8 divisional teams)
- Title holders: Dr. Crokes (15th title)
- Most titles: Dr. Crokes (15 titles)
- Sponsors: Garvey's SuperValu
- TV partner(s): TG4, RTÉ 2
- Official website: www.kerrygaa.ie/fixtures-results/?compID=199273&leagueTable=y

The Kerry Senior Football Championship (known for sponsorship reasons as Garvey's SuperValu Senior Football Championship) is an annual Gaelic football competition organised by the Kerry County Board of the Gaelic Athletic Association since 1889 for the top Gaelic football teams in the county of Kerry in Ireland.

The series of games are played during the summer and autumn months, with the county final currently being played in either Austin Stack Park or FitzGerald Stadium in October. Initially played as a knock-out competition, the championship currently uses a double elimination format whereby each team is guaranteed at least two games.

The Kerry County Championship is an integral part of the wider Munster Senior Club Football Championship. The winners of the Kerry county final join the champion clubs of the other five counties to contest the provincial championship. The winning team of the county championship also has the honour of naming the captain of the Kerry senior team for the following year.

The title has been won at least once by 22 different teams. The all-time record-holders are Dr. Crokes who have both won a total of 15 titles, the most recent being in 2026.

The winners receive the Bishop Moynihan Cup, named for Denis Moynihan, Catholic Bishop of Kerry in 1952–1969.

== Format ==
The Championship is contested annually by Kerry's Senior clubs for that year (the teams who compete in the Kerry Club Football Championship) and Kerry's divisional teams. The Championship has almost always being played using a knockout type format, with the exception being in 2022 and 2023 when a first round group phase was used to produce 8 quarter-finalists. Since 2024 the knockout type format has returned with the first two rounds being a double-elimination format while a single-elimination format applies from then on.

=== Relegation and promotion ===
Relegation from and promotion to the Championship is based on the Kerry Club Football Championship each year. Divisional sides are not affected by relegation. Due to the expansion of the Club Football Championship beginning in 2025, no teams were relegated from the Senior Championship in 2024 or 2025, but relegation returned in 2026.

== Teams ==
=== 2026 Teams ===
16 teams will compete in the 2026 Kerry Senior Football Championship: 10 clubs and 7 divisional teams.

Team	Location	Club/Division	Club's Divisional Side	Colours	Position in 2025	In championship since	Championship Titles	Last Championship Title
An Ghaeltacht	Dingle Peninsula	Club	West Kerry	Red and white	Intermediate champions	2026	2	2003
Austin Stacks	Tralee	Club	St Brendan's	Black and amber	Runners-up	2025	13	2021
Dingle	Dingle	Club	West Kerry	Red and white	Champions	2005	7	2025
Dr Crokes	Killarney	Club	East Kerry	Black and amber	First round	1986	14	2024
East Kerry	East Kerry	Division	N/A	Red and white	Quarter-finals	1929	11	2023
Kenmare Shamrocks	Kenmare	Club	Kenmare District	Black and red	Quarter-finals	2017	0	—
Mid Kerry	Mid Kerry	Division	N/A	Green and red	Semi-finals	1947	4	2008
Milltown/Castlemaine	Milltown	Club	Mid Kerry	Green and white	Round 1	2024	0	—
Na Gaeil	Tralee	Club	St Brendan's	White and green	First round	2022	0	—
North Kerry	North Kerry	Division	N/A	Black and white	First round	2025	0	—
Rathmore	Rathmore	Club	East Kerry	Red and white	Semi-finals	2023	0	—
South Kerry	South Kerry	Division	N/A	Green and gold	First round	1930	10	2015
Spa	Killarney	Club	East Kerry	Blue and gold	Quarter-finals	2021	0	—
St Brendan's	Tralee	Division	N/A	Green, black and white	Preliminary round 2		0	—
St Kieran's	Castleisland	Division	N/A	Green and white	Preliminary round 2	1988	1	1988
Templenoe	Templenoe	Club	Kenmare District	Blue and white	Round 1	2020	0	—
West Kerry	West Kerry	Division	N/A	Red and white	Quarter-finals	1930	3	1990

=== Clubs eligible for divisional teams ===
Division	Clubs eligible for divisional team
East Kerry	Firies, Fossa, Glenflesk, Gneevguilla, Listry, Kilcummin, Killarney Legion
Mid Kerry	Beaufort, Cromane, Glenbeigh-Glencar, Keel, Laune Rangers
North Kerry	Feale Rangers: Clounmacon, Duagh, Finuge, Knockanure, Listowel Emmets, Moyvane, St Senan's
North Kerry	Shannon Rangers: Asdee, Ballydonoghue, Ballyduff, Ballylongford, Beale, Tarbert
South Kerry	Dromid Pearses, Kilgarvan, Renard, Skellig Rangers, Sneem-Derrynane, St. Mary's, Valentia Young Islanders, Waterville, St.Michaels/Foilmore, Tuosist,
St Brendan's	St Brendan's: Churchill, St. Patrick's Blennerville, Ardfert
St Brendan's	Tralee: John Mitchels, Kerins O'Rahillys
St Kieran's	Ballymacelligott, Brosna, Castleisland Desmonds, Cordal, Currow, Knocknagoshel, Scartaglin
West Kerry	Annascaul, Castlegregory, Lispole

Note 1: Kenmare District no longer enter a divisional team so their affiliated clubs played for East Kerry until 2025 when Kilgarvan switched to South Kerry.

Note 2: Feale Rangers and Shannon Rangers amalgamated in 2025 to revive North Kerry.

Note 3: Tralee no longer enter a divisional team so their affiliated clubs play for St Brendan's.

== Roll of honour ==
=== By club ===
#	Team	Titles	Runners-Up	Championships won	Championships runner-up
1	Dr Crokes	15	9	1901, 1912, 1913, 1914, 1991, 2000, 2010, 2011, 2012, 2013, 2016, 2017, 2018, 2024, 2026	1889, 1900, 1987, 1988, 1994, 2005, 2006, 2009, 2019
2	Austin Stacks	13	8	1928, 1930, 1931, 1932, 1936, 1973, 1975, 1976, 1979, 1986, 1994, 2014, 2021	1929, 1933, 1980, 1981, 2001, 2010, 2013, 2025
3	East Kerry	11	3	1965, 1968, 1969, 1970, 1997, 1998, 1999, 2019, 2020, 2022, 2023	1964, 1966, 1995
4	John Mitchels	10	7	1929, 1937, 1947, 1952, 1959, 1960, 1961, 1962, 1963, 1966	1931, 1941, 1942, 1946, 1949, 1951, 1989
4	Laune Rangers	10	3	1889, 1890, 1892, 1893, 1900, 1911, 1989, 1993, 1995, 1996	1910, 1997, 2004
4	South Kerry	10	3	1955, 1956, 1958, 1981, 1982, 2004, 2005, 2006, 2009, 2015	1984, 2007, 2017
7	Tralee Mitchels	9	5	1896, 1897, 1902, 1903, 1907, 1908, 1910, 1917, 1919	1890, 1897, 1911, 1912, 1914
8	Dingle	7	6	1938, 1940, 1941, 1943, 1944, 1948, 2025	1937, 1939, 1947, 2012, 2018, 2024
9	Kerins O'Rahilly's	6	9	1933, 1939, 1953, 1954, 1957, 2002	1928, 1930, 1936, 1940, 1956, 1961, 1963, 2008, 2021
10	Shannon Rangers	5	5	1942, 1945, 1964, 1972, 1977	1948, 1953, 1955, 1971, 1974
11	Mid Kerry	4	9	1967, 1971, 1992, 2008	1965, 1972, 1975, 1978, 1990, 2014, 2020, 2022, 2023
11	Ballymacelligott	4	1	1891, 1894, 1895, 1918	1892
13	Feale Rangers	3	6	1978, 1980, 2007	1959, 1962, 1977, 1982, 1983, 1985
13	West Kerry	3	4	1984, 1985, 1990	1960, 1967, 1973, 1996
15	Killarney District	2	2	1949, 1983	1950, 1986
15	Kenmare District	2	1	1974, 1987	2016
15	An Ghaeltacht	2	1	2001, 2003	2000
15	Tralee District	2	0	1925, 1926	—
19	Cahersiveen	1	3	1896	1901, 1904, 1905
19	Killarney Legion	1	2	1946	1945, 2015
19	Castleisland District	1	2	1950	1943, 1944
19	Irremore	1	1	1897	1894
19	St Kieran's	1	1	1988	1998
19	Dick Fitzgeralds	1	0	1951	—
24	North Kerry	0	2	—	1932, 1938
24	Keel	0	2	—	1891, 1893
24	Kilcummin	0	3	—	1903, 1913, 2002
24	Dingle Gascons	0	2	—	1908, 1919
24	Farranfore	0	2	—	1917, 1918
24	Listowel Selection	0	2	—	1925, 1926
24	Lispole	0	1	—	1907
24	Castleisland Desmonds	0	1	—	1991
24	Kenmare Shamrocks	0	1	—	2026

=== Performances by division ===
Division	Titles	Runners-up	Total
Tralee District	41	27	68
East Kerry	30	20	50
Mid Kerry	14	14	28
West Kerry	12	14	26
South Kerry	11	6	17
Shannon Rangers	8	5	13
St Kieran's	6	5	11
Feale Rangers	4	9	13
Kenmare District	2	2	4

== List of finals ==
Year	Winners		Runners-up		#
Year	Club	Score	Club	Score	#
2026	Dr Crokes	1–24	Kenmare Shamrocks	2–12	
2025	Dingle	2–13	Austin Stacks	1–12	
2024	Dr Crokes	3-08	Dingle	0-11	
2023	East Kerry	2-10	Mid Kerry	0-15	
2022	East Kerry	1-16	Mid Kerry	0-10	
2021	Austin Stacks	0-13	Kerins O'Rahillys	0-10	
2020	East Kerry	2-15	Mid Kerry	0-09	
2019	East Kerry	2–14	Dr Crokes	1-07	
2018	Dr Crokes	1–15	Dingle	0–12	
2017	Dr Crokes	0–17	South Kerry	1–12	
2016	Dr Crokes	2–16	Kenmare District	1–12	
2015	South Kerry	1-13 (R)	Killarney Legion	1-12 (R)	
2014	Austin Stacks	2-13 (R)	Mid Kerry	1-07 (R)	
2013	Dr Crokes	4–16	Austin Stacks	0–12	
2012	Dr Crokes	2–13	Dingle	0-08	
2011	Dr Crokes	2-08	Mid Kerry	0-09	
2010	Dr Crokes	1–15	Austin Stacks	0–11	
2009	South Kerry	1-08	Dr Crokes	0-10	
2008	Mid Kerry	1-07 (R)	Kerins O'Rahilly's	0-09 (R)	
2007	Feale Rangers	1-04	South Kerry	0-06	
2006	South Kerry	0-12	Dr Crokes	1-08	
2005	South Kerry	0-12	Dr Crokes	1-06	
2004	South Kerry	1-13	Laune Rangers	2-05	
2003	An Ghaeltacht	0-12 (R)	Laune Rangers	2-04 (R)	
2002	Kerins O'Rahilly's	0-14	Kilcummin	0-05	
2001	An Ghaeltacht	1-13	Austin Stacks	0-10	
2000	Dr Crokes	1-04	An Ghaeltacht	0-06	
1999	East Kerry	0–10	Feale Rangers	1–06	
1998	East Kerry	2–13	St Kieran's	1–10	
1997	East Kerry	1–11 (R)	Laune Rangers	0–08 (R)	
1996	Laune Rangers	2–07	West Kerry	1–09	
1995	Laune Rangers	1–07	East Kerry	0–06	
1994	Austin Stacks	0–12 (R)	Dr. Crokes	1–05 (R)	
1993	Laune Rangers	1–15	Annascaul	1–08	
1992	Mid Kerry	3–09	St Brendan's	1-10	
1991	Dr Crokes	2–10	Castleisland Desmonds	1–10	
1990	West Kerry	4–09	Mid Kerry	0–07	
1989	Laune Rangers	2-13	John Mitchels	1-06	
1988	St Kieran's	0-10	Dr Crokes	0-03	
1987	Kenmare District	3-10 (R)	Dr Crokes	0-18 (R)	
1986	Austin Stacks	1-11	Killarney	1-07	
1985	West Kerry	0-11	Feale Rangers	1-05	
1984	West Kerry	1-07	South Kerry	1-06	
1983	Killarney	1-10 (R)	Feale Rangers	1-04 (R)	
1982	South Kerry	0-07	Feale Rangers	0-05	
1981	South Kerry	1-12	Austin Stacks	0-11	
1980	Feale Rangers	1-10	Austin Stacks	1-07	
1979	Austin Stacks	1-11	Castleisland	0-09	
1978	Feale Rangers	0-08	Mid Kerry	0-03	
1977	Shannon Rangers	0-10	Feale Rangers	0-06	
1976	Austin Stacks	1-14	Kenmare	0-07	
1975	Austin Stacks	1-07	Mid Kerry	1-04	
1974	Kenmare	2-12	Shannon Rangers	1-05	
1973	Austin Stacks	2-08	West Kerry	1-06	
1972	Shannon Rangers	2-08	Mid Kerry	1-07	
1971	Mid Kerry	0-12 (R)	Shannon Rangers	1-06 (R)	
1970	East Kerry	1-15	Waterville	0-15	
1969	East Kerry	2-07	Waterville	1-08	
1968	East Kerry	6-08	Waterville	1-09	
1967	Mid Kerry	0-12	West Kerry	2-04	
1966	John Mitchels	2-10	East Kerry	1-10	
1965	East Kerry	0-10 (R)	Mid Kerry	0-04 (R)	
1964	Shannon Rangers	1-10	East Kerry	1-05	
1963	John Mitchels	4-04	Kerins O'Rahilly's	2-03	
1962	John Mitchels	1-09 (R)	Feale Rangers	0-05 (R)	
1961	John Mitchels	2-09	Kerins O'Rahilly's	0-08	
1960	John Mitchels	1-11 (R)	West Kerry	0-03 (R)	
1959	John Mitchels	3-09 (R)	Feale Rangers	1-10 (R)	
1958	South Kerry	1-13	St Brendan's	1-05	
1957	Kerins O'Rahilly's	1-11	St Brendan's	3-01	
1956	South Kerry	1-11	Kerins O'Rahilly's	0-10	
1955	South Kerry	2-05 (R)	Shannon Rangers	0-09 (R)	
1954	Kerins O'Rahilly's	2-01	Kenmare District	1-02	
1953	Kerins O'Rahilly's	1-04	Shannon Rangers	0-05	
1952	John Mitchels	3-06	Kenmare District	0-06	
1951	Dick Fitzgeralds	1-07	John Mitchels	0-03	
1950	Castleisland	1-07 (R)	Killarney	1-04 (R)	
1949	Killarney	2-07	John Mitchels	2-03	
1948	Dingle	2-10	Shannon Rangers	0-05	
1947	John Mitchels	2-05	Dingle	0-09	
1946	Killarney Legion	0-07	John Mitchels	0-05	
1945	Shannon Rangers	1-07	Killarney Legion	0-05	
1944	Dingle	1-03	Castleisland	0-04	
1943	Dingle	3-06	Castleisland	2-02	
1942	Shannon Rangers	2-04	John Mitchels	1-03	
1941	Dingle	3-06	John Mitchels	2-00	
1940	Dingle	2-06	Kerins O'Rahilly's	1-07	
1939	Kerins O'Rahilly's	2-08	Dingle	1-03	
1938	Dingle	3-03	North Kerry	2-05	
1937	John Mitchels	1-03	Dingle	0-00	
1936	Austin Stacks	0-06	Kerins O'Rahilly's	0-04	
1935	Championship was not played				
1934	Final (Austin Stacks v Kerins O'Rahilly's) was not played				
1933	Kerins O'Rahilly's	5-05	Austin Stacks	0-05	
1932	Austin Stacks	2-03	North Kerry	1-05	
1931	Austin Stacks	2-07	John Mitchels	1-03	
1930	Austin Stacks	4-04	Kerins O'Rahilly's	2-05	
1929	John Mitchels	3-04	Austin Stacks	0-04	
1928	Austin Stacks	3-04	Kerins O'Rahilly's	0-07	
1927	Championship was not played				
1926	Tralee Division	7-07	Listowel Selection	2-01	
1925	Tralee Division	1-05	Listowel Selection	0-04	
1924	Championship was not played				
1923	Championship not finished				
1922	Championship was not played				
1921	Championship was not played				
1920	Championship not finished				
1919	Tralee Mitchels	3-03	Dingle Gascons	2-02	
1918	Ballymacelligott		Farranfore		
1917	Tralee Mitchels		Farranfore		
1916	Not finished				
1915	Not played				
1914	Killarney Crokes	1-02	Tralee Mitchels	1-00	
1913	Killarney Crokes	3-01	Kilcummin	1-00	
1912	Killarney Crokes	1-06	Tralee Mitchels	0-00	
1911	Laune Rangers	1-03	Tralee Mitchels	1-01	
1910	Tralee Mitchels	3-04	Laune Rangers	0–04	
1909	Combined with 1910 championship				
1908	Tralee Mitchels	0-08	Dingle Gascons	0-04	
1907	Tralee Mitchels	0-11	Lispole	0-01	
1906	Not played				
1905	Tralee Mitchels	W/O	Caherciveen		
1904	Tralee Mitchels	W/O	Caherciveen		
1903	Tralee Mitchels	W/O	Kilcummin		
1902	Tralee Mitchels (Awarded)				
1901	Killarney Crokes	1-02	Caherciveen	0-02	
1900	Laune Rangers	3-04	Killarney Crokes	0-03	
1899					
1898					
1897	Irremore		Tralee Mitchels		
1896	Caherciveen and Tralee Mitchels (Shared)				
1895	Ballymacelligott				
1894	Ballymacelligott	W/O	Irremore		
1893	Laune Rangers	1-01	Keel	0-02	
1892	Laune Rangers	3-07	Ballymacelligott	1-07	
1891	Ballymacelligott	1-08	Keel	0-01	
1890	Laune Rangers	1-04	Tralee Mitchels	0-01	
1889	Laune Rangers	0-06	Killarney Crokes	0-03	

== Records and statistics ==
=== Teams ===
==== By decade ====
The most successful team of each decade, judged by number of Kerry Senior Football Championship titles, is as follows:

- 1880s: 1 for Laune Rangers (1889)
- 1890s: 3 each for Laune Rangers (1890-92-93) and Ballymacelligott (1891-94-95)
- 1900s: 4 for Tralee Mitchels (1902-03-07-08)
- 1910s: 3 each for Tralee Mitchels (1910-17-19) and Dr Crokes (1912-13-14)
- 1920s: 3 for Tralee Division (1925-26-27)
- 1930s: 4 for Austin Stacks (1930-31-32-36)
- 1940s: 5 for Dingle (1940-41-43-44-48)
- 1950s: 3 each for Kerins O'Rahilly's (1953-54-57) and South Kerry (1955-56-58)
- 1960s: 5 for John Mitchels (1960-61-62-63-66)
- 1970s: 4 for Austin Stacks (1973-75-76-79)
- 1980s: 2 each for South Kerry (1981–82) and West Kerry (1984–85)
- 1990s: 3 each for Laune Rangers (1993-95-96) and East Kerry (1997-98-99)
- 2000s: 4 for South Kerry (2004-05-06-09)
- 2010s: 7 for Dr Crokes (2010-11-12-13-16-17-18)
- 2020s: 3 for East Kerry (2020-22-23)

==== Gaps ====
Longest gaps between successive championship titles:

- 78 years: Laune Rangers (1911–1989)
- 77 years: Dr Crokes (1914–1991) and Dingle (1948–2025)
- 45 years: Kerins O'Rahilly's (1957–2002)
- 37 years: Austin Stacks (1936–1973)
- 34 years: Killarney (1949–1983)
- 27 years: Feale Rangers (1980–2007) and East Kerry (1970–1997)
- 23 years: Ballymacelligott (1895–1918) and South Kerry (1958–1981)
- 22 years: South Kerry (1982–2004)

== See also ==
- Kerry Club Football Championship
- Kerry Senior Hurling Championship
- Munster Senior Club Football Championship
- Kerry Intermediate Football Championship (Tier 2)
- Kerry Premier Junior Football Championship (Tier 3)
- Kerry Junior Football Championship (Tier 4)
- Kerry Novice Football Championship (Tier 5)
