= 1973 Kerry Senior Football Championship =

Gaelic football competition

- Teams: 16
- Champions: Austin Stacks (6th title); Billy Curtin (captain)
- Runners-up: West Kerry

The 1973 Kerry Senior Football Championship was the 73rd staging of the Kerry Senior Football Championship since its establishment by the Kerry County Board in 1889.

Shannon Rangers entered the championship as the defending champions.

The final was played on 21 October 1973 at Austin Stack Park in Tralee, between Austin Stacks and West Kerry, in what was their first ever meeting in the final. Austin Stacks won the match by 2-08 to 1-06 to claim their sixth championship title overall and a first title in 37 years.

== Results ==
=== Final ===
21 October 1973 Final	Austin Stacks	2-08 - 1-06	West Kerry	Austin Stack Park
	M Sheehy 0-7, G Power 1-0, T O'Regan 1-0, JJ Barrett 0-1.		P Ó Sé 1-1, G Dillon 0-2, T McDonnell 0-1, L Higgins 0-1, S Fitzgerald 0-1.

== Championship statistics ==
=== Miscellaneous ===
- Austin Stacks win a first title in 37 years.
- Austin Stacks qualify for the final for the first time since 1936.
