= 1961 Kerry Senior Football Championship =

Gaelic football competition

- Teams: 13
- Champions: John Mitchels (7th title); Fred Lynch (captain)
- Runners-up: Kerins O'Rahilly's

The 1961 Kerry Senior Football Championship was the 61st staging of the Kerry Senior Football Championship since its establishment by the Kerry County Board in 1889.

John Mitchels entered the championship as the defending champions.

The final was played on 15 October 1961 between John Mitchels and Kerins O'Rahilly's, in what was their first ever meeting in the final. John Mitchels won the match by 2–09 to 0–08 to claim their seventh championship title overall and a third title in succession.

== Results ==
=== Final ===
15 October 1961 Final	John Mitchels	2-09 - 0-08	Kerins O'Rahilly's	FitzGerald Stadium

== Championship statistics ==
=== Miscellaneous ===
- John Mitchels become the first team since Austin Stacks between 1930 and 1932 to win three titles in a row.
- John Mitchels and Kerins O'Rahilly's face each-other in the final for the first time.
