= 1964 Kerry Senior Football Championship =

Gaelic football competition

- Teams: 13
- Champions: Shannon Rangers (3rd title); Dan McAuliffe (captain)
- Runners-up: East Kerry

The 1964 Kerry Senior Football Championship was the 64th staging of the Kerry Senior Football Championship since its establishment by the Kerry County Board in 1889.

John Mitchels entered the championship as the defending champions in search of a sixth successive title, however, they were beaten by South Kerry in the quarter-finals.

The final was played on 6 September 1964 between Shannon Rangers and East Kerry, in what was their first ever meeting in the final. Shannon Rangers won the match by 1-10 to 1-05 to claim their third championship title overall and a first title in 19 years.

== Results ==
=== Final ===
6 September 1964 Final	Shannon Rangers	1-10 - 1-05	East Kerry	Austin Stack Park

== Championship statistics ==
=== Miscellaneous ===
- Shannon Rangers won a first title in 19 years.
- East Kerry qualify for the final for the first time.
- John Mitchels, the defending champions in search of a sixth successive title, suffer their first championship loss since 1958.
