= 1960 Kerry Senior Football Championship =

Gaelic football competition

- Teams: 13
- Champions: John Mitchels (6th title); Paudie Sheehy (captain)
- Runners-up: West Kerry

The 1960 Kerry Senior Football Championship was the 60th staging of the Kerry Senior Football Championship since its establishment by the Kerry County Board in 1889.

John Mitchels entered the championship as the defending champions.

The final was played on 9 April 1961 between John Mitchels and West Kerry, in what was their first ever meeting in the final. John Mitchels won the match by 1-11 to 0-03 to claim their sixth championship title overall and a second title in succession.

== Results ==
=== Final ===
6 November 1960 Final	John Mitchels	1-06 - 0-09	West Kerry	Austin Stack Park

9 April 1961 Final replay	John Mitchels	3-09 - 1-10	West Kerry	FitzGerald Stadium

=== Miscellaneous ===
- West Kerry qualify for the final for the first time.
