= 1929 Kerry Senior Football Championship =

Gaelic football competition

- Teams: 8
- Champions: Boherbee (1st title); John Joe Sheehy (captain)
- Runners-up: Rock Street

The 1929 Kerry Senior Football Championship was the 31st staging of the Kerry Senior Football Championship since its establishment by the Kerry County Board in 1889.

Rock Street entered the championship as the defending champions.

The final was played on 13 October 1929 between Boherbee and Rock Street, in what was their first ever meeting in the final. Boherbee won the match by 3–04 to 0–04 to claim their first ever championship title.

== Results ==
=== Final ===
13 October 1929 Final	Boherbee	3-04 - 0-04	Rock Street

=== Miscellaneous ===
- Boherbee win the title for the first time.
- Boherbee miss out on the double as they lost out to Rock Street in the Kerry Senior Hurling Championship.
