= 1914 Kerry Senior Football Championship =

Gaelic football competition

- Teams: 11
- Champions: Dr. Crokes (4th title)
- Runners-up: Tralee Mitchels

The 1914 Kerry Senior Football Championship was the 22nd staging of the Kerry Senior Football Championship since its establishment by the Kerry County Board in 1889.

Dr. Crokes entered the championship as the defending champions.

The final was played on 9 January 1915 at Rathmore Sportsfield, between Dr. Crokes and Tralee Mitchels, in what was their first ever meeting in the final. Dr. Crokes won the match by 1–02 to 1–00 to claim their fourth championship title overall and a third title in succession.

== Results ==
=== Final ===
9 January 1915 Final	Dr. Crokes	1-02 - 1-00	Tralee Mitchels
