= 1959 Kerry Senior Football Championship =

Gaelic football competition

- Teams: 13
- Champions: John Mitchels (5th title); Niall Sheehy (captain)
- Runners-up: Feale Rangers

The 1959 Kerry Senior Football Championship was the 59th staging of the Kerry Senior Football Championship since its establishment by the Kerry County Board in 1889.

South Kerry entered the championship as the defending champions.

The final was played on 26 June 1960 between John Mitchels and Feale Rangers, in what was their first ever meeting in the final. John Mitchels won the match by 3-09 to 1-10 to claim their fifth championship title overall and a first title in seven years.

== Results ==
=== Final ===
29 May 1960 Final	John Mitchels	1-09 - 2-06	Feale Rangers	Austin Stack Park

26 June 1960 Final replay	John Mitchels	3-09 - 1-10	Feale Rangers	Austin Stack Park

== Championship statistics ==
=== Miscellaneous ===
- John Mitchels win a first title in seven years.
- Feale Rangers qualify for the final for the first time.
- John Mitchels and Feale Rangers face each-other in the final for the first time.
