= North Kerry GAA =

North Kerry Divisional Gaelic football team in County Kerry, Ireland

North Kerry
- Ciarraí Thuaidh
- Founded: 1930
- County: Kerry
- Colours

Playing kits
Standard colours

North Kerry is a Divisional Gaelic football team based in County Kerry, Ireland. Originally founded in 1930, the senior team was reformed in 2025 by the amalgamation of Divisional sides Feale Rangers and Shannon Rangers to compete in the Kerry Senior Football Championship.

== History ==
A team known as North Kerry was first formed in 1930 as an amalgamation of North Kerry clubs to compete in the Kerry Senior Football Championship of that year. In 1931 the team won the Intermediate Championship and retained the title the following year. They also reached the Final of the Senior championship in 1932, losing to Rock Street (Austin Stacks). The team reached the final again in 1938, but lost to Dingle.

In 1940 a number of clubs broke away from the North Kerry team and founded Shannon Rangers. They won the Intermediate Championship again in 1949 and continued to compete in the Kerry Senior Football Championship until 1955. In 1956 a new team called Feale Rangers was formed as Shannon Rangers and North Kerry joined to represent all of north Kerry.

It would be over 60 years before another team would compete as North Kerry when in 2021, Feale Rangers and Shannon Rangers combined at minor level to compete in the Kerry Minor Football Championship. They reached the semi-finals that first year and won the championship the following year. Also in 2022 North Kerry competed in the Under-21 county championship, reaching the final but losing to East Kerry. The following year they reached the final, again playing East Kerry but on this occasion they were victorious. The same two sides also met in the county minor final in 2023 but East Kerry were victors in this one.

These successes at underage level prompted both Feale Rangers and Shannon Rangers to make a submission to the Kerry County Board in February 2025 to compete as a combined North Kerry team for the Kerry Senior Football Championship. The proposal was overwhelmingly endorsed the following April resulting in a change in format for the county championship and North Kerry making its first appearance in the championship for 70 years.

In 2026 North Kerry won their 2nd Kerry Minor Football Championship defeating East Kerry by a point in the final.

== Honours ==
- Kerry Senior Football Championship (0): (runners-up in 1932, 1938)
- Kerry Intermediate Football Championship (3): 1931, 1932, 1949
- Kerry Under-21 Football Championship (1): 2023
- Kerry Minor Football Championship (2): 2022, 2026

== Divisional competitions ==
- North Kerry Senior Football Championship
