= Tralee GAA =

Garlic Athletic Association

Tralee
- County: Kerry
- Grounds: Tralee

Senior Club Championships
	All Ireland	Munster champions	Kerry champions
Football:	-	-	3
Hurling:	-	-	2

Tralee District is a Gaelic Athletic Association Divisional Team from Tralee in County Kerry, Ireland. They won Kerry Senior Football Championship three times in a row in 1925, 1926, and 1927. They also won the Kerry Senior Hurling Championship in 1927. The district now only competes at under 14 and under 16 level. The side can select players who represent Austin Stacks, Kerins O'Rahillys and John Mitchels, the other Tralee clubs represent St. Brendan's divisional team.

== Member clubs ==
The clubs affiliated to Tralee GAA include the following (the other clubs in Tralee are affiliated to St Brendan's):

- Austin Stacks
- John Mitchels
- Kerins O'Rahillys

== Honours ==
- Kerry Senior Football Championship: (3) 1925, 1926, 1927
- Kerry Senior Hurling Championship: (1) 1925
- Kerry Under-21 Football Championship: (1) 2001

== See also ==
- St Brendan's Board GAA
