= St Brendan's Board GAA =

Gaelic games divisional team in County Kerry, Ireland

St Brendan's Board
- Coiste Peil Naomh Breandán
- County: Kerry
- Colours: Green, Black and White hoops

Playing kits
First kit	Second kit

Senior Club Championships
	All Ireland	Munster champions	Kerry champions
Football:	0	0	0

St Brendan's Board GAA is one of several divisions in the Kerry GAA system. It is based in the north of the county and fields teams from under-15 right up senior level.

== Member clubs ==
Football clubs unless stated.

- Ardfert
- Austin Stacks (affiliated with Tralee)
- Churchill
- John Mitchels (affiliated with Tralee)
- Kerins O'Rahilly's (affiliated with Tralee)
- Na Gaeil
- St Brendan’s (hurling)
- St. Patrick's, Blennerville
- Tralee Mitchels (defunct)
- Tralee Parnells (hurling)

== History ==
At the County Board Convention in 1924 it was decided to subdivide Kerry into four divisions. North, South, East and West Kerry were the original four divisions. Further divisions were established in subsequent years, with several rural clubs in the Tralee area affiliating to the St Brendan's Board. In 2021, the St Brendan's Board and Tralee Town Board merged to form just one District Board.

== Honours ==
- Kerry Senior Football Championship: Runners-up: 1957, 1958, 1992

== Divisional competitions ==
=== Tralee Town / St Brendan's Board Senior Football Championship ===
==== Teams ====
Team	Location	Colours	Division	Championship titles	Last championship title
Ardfert	Ardfert	Black and white	St Brendan’s	0	—
Austin Stacks	Tralee	Black and amber	Tralee	1	2023
Ballymacelligott	Ballymacelligott		St Kieran's	0	—
Churchill	Tralee	Green and black	St Brendan’s	0	—
John Mitchels	Tralee	Green and yellow	Tralee	0	—
Kerins O'Rahilly's	Tralee	Blue and white	Tralee	0	—
Na Gaeil	Tralee	Green and white	St Brendan’s	0	—
St Patrick’s, Blennerville	Blennerville	Red and white	St Brendan’s	0	—

==== Roll of honour ====
Year	Winners		Runners-up		#
Year	Club	Score	Club	Score	#
2024	Austin Stacks	1-11	Ardfert	1-05	
2023	Austin Stacks	2-18	Ballymacelligott	1-04	
2022	Ballymacelligott		Austin Stacks		

== See also ==
- Tralee GAA
