= Waterville GAA =

Gaelic games club in County Kerry, Ireland

- CLG Phrionsias Uí Chathasaigh, An Coireán
- Founded: 1889
- County: Kerry
- Nickname: The Caseys
- Colours: Red and White
- Grounds: Waterville Gaa
- Coordinates: 51°49′33.05″N 10°09′42.41″W

Playing kits
Standard colours

Waterville GAA is a Gaelic Athletic Association Gaelic football club in Waterville, south County Kerry, Ireland. Former Kerry player & manager Mick O'Dwyer is from the club. The club grounds have gone under a major renovation in the recent years with a gym, clubhouse and state of the art floodlights.

== Achievements ==
- Kerry Senior Football Championship Runners-Up 1968, 1969, 1970
- South Kerry Senior Football Championship - 11 titles
- Kerry County Football League – Division 1 - 1971
- All-Ireland Football Sevens hosted by Kilmacud Crokes - 1974
- Kerry Intermediate Football Championship - 1993

== Notable players ==
- Mick O'Dwyer
- Denis O'Dwyer
- Karl O'Dwyer
- Mick O'Connell
