= St Kieran's GAA (Kerry) =

Gaelic games club in County Kerry, Ireland

St Kieran's
- Founded: 1988
- County: Kerry
- Colours: Green and white

Playing kits
Standard colours

Senior Club Championships
	All Ireland	Munster champions	Kerry champions
Football:	0	0	1

St Kieran's is a divisional Gaelic football team from County Kerry, Ireland. The team participates in competitions organised by Kerry GAA county board. The team consists of players from 7 clubs in North Kerry (3), East Kerry (3) and Tralee District Board (1).

== Member clubs ==
- Cordal
- Currow
- Scartaglin
- Brosna
- Castleisland Desmonds
- Knocknagoshel
- Ballymacelligott

== Honours ==
- Kerry Senior Football Championship (1): 1988
- Kerry Minor Football Championship (4): 1994, 2009, 2024, 2025

== Divisional competitions ==
- North Kerry Senior Football Championship
