= Killarney GAA =

- County: Kerry
- Grounds: Killarney

Senior Club Championships
	All Ireland	Munster champions	Kerry champions
Football:	0	0	2
Hurling:	0	0	1

GAA Killarney are a former Football and Hurling Divisional Team in County Kerry, Ireland and composed of players from the Dr Crokes and Legion clubs. They have won 2 Kerry Senior Football Championships in 1949 and 1983 and 1 Kerry Senior Hurling Championship in 1969 and were beaten in the final in 1951.

== Member clubs ==
- Dr Crokes (Now affiliated with East Kerry)
- Killarney Legion (Now affiliated with East Kerry)

Note: The division is now defunct and member clubs are affiliated with East Kerry.

== Honours ==
- Kerry Senior Football Championship
  - (gold) Winners (2): 1949, 1983
  - (silver) Runners-Up (2): 1950, 1986
- Kerry Senior Hurling Championship
  - (gold) Winners (1): 1969
  - (silver) Runners-Up (2): 1951, 1970
- Kerry Minor Hurling Championship
  - (gold) Winners (3): 1950, 1951, 1952
  - (silver) Runners-Up (2): 1953, 1954

== See also ==
- East Kerry GAA
