= Castleisland Desmonds GAA =

Gaelic Athletic Association club in Ireland

Castleisland Desmonds
- Oilean Chiarraí Deasúnaigh
- Founded: 1903
- County: Kerry
- Nickname: Desmonds
- Colours: White & Blue
- Grounds: Moanmore
- Coordinates: 52°14′18.05″N 9°27′48.14″W

Playing kits
Standard colours

Senior Club Championships
	All Ireland	Munster champions	Kerry champions
Football:	1	2	1
Ladies' football:	2	4	–

Castleisland Desmonds are a Gaelic Athletic Association club in Castleisland, County Kerry, Ireland. The club is affiliated with North Kerry and their players play with St Kieran's divisional team. The club won its first County Championship in 1950. They won others in 1981, 1982 and 1984. They won the Munster Club Championship and All-Ireland Club Championship in 1985.

== Celebrity Bainisteoir ==
In 2010, the club was selected to enter RTÉ's Celebrity Bainisteoir TV show. Their Celebrity Bainisteoir was Derek Burke from Crystal Swing.

In the quarter finals, Castleisland played against Nuala Carey's Shannonbridge side from County Offaly. In the 2010 season of Celebrity Bainisteoir, home advantage for each game bar the final was determined by an assault course challenge, which took place at the Irish Army's training camp in The Curragh, County Kildare. Having lost the home venue decider in the Curragh, Desmonds travelled to Shannonbridge. In a close game, Castleisland won on a 2–10 to 2-06 scoreline.

In the semi-finals, having won the home venue decider in the Curragh, Desmonds hosted Breffny Morgan's County Galway team, Kilconly. Desmonds ultimately won the match by 3 points (1 goal), on a 2–11 to 1-11 scoreline, thereby securing a place in the final. This match took place on 25 September 2010 and was featured in the episode of Celebrity Bainisteoir which aired on 17 October 2010.

In the final of Celebrity Bainisteoir, Desmonds faced Mairéad Farrell's Ballymun Kickhams from Dublin. The match took place at Parnell Park, Dublin on 29 October 2010. Early in the game the Desmonds scored the first point, and added 3 more without reply, but by half time Kickhams had fought back to lead Desmonds by 1 point at 1–3 to 0–5. Ballymun scored early in the second half, but with ten minutes remaining both sides were level. Kickhams scored another point, to which Desmonds responded with a goal. Now under pressure, Kickhams missed one point-scoring opportunity, but succeeded with another to narrow the gap to a single point. As the game intensified, an incident occurred which resulted in a Desmond's player receiving a second yellow card, and being sent off with four minutes remaining. Despite this, Ballymun failed to capitalise, missing their best chance at scoring in injury time. Desmonds held their lead, to win the game by a single point with a final scoreline of 1–08 to 1-07. The match was featured in the episode of Celebrity Bainisteoir which aired on 31 October 2010.

== Notable players ==
- Charlie Nelligan, seven time All-Ireland Senior Football Championship winner.
- Timmy O'Sullivan, All Ireland Senior Football winner 1962
- David Geaney, two time All-Ireland Senior Football Championship winner. 1985 All-Ireland Senior Club Football Championship winning manager
- Donie Buckley, All-Ireland club winner. Coach with Limerick, Clare, Kerry, Mayo and Monaghan.
- Mary Geaney, All-Ireland Senior Ladies' Football Championship winner with Kerry. Three time All-Ireland Senior Camogie Championship winner with Cork.
- Dermot Hannafin, two time All-Ireland Senior Football Championship winner. All-Ireland club winner.
- Dermot Hannafin (Snr), 1953 All-Ireland Senior Football Championship winner.
- Mossie Lyons, three time All-Ireland Senior Football Championship winner.
- Tim Lyons, three time All-Ireland Senior Football Championship winner.
- Ger Reidy, Kerry goalkeeper

== Roll of honour ==
- All-Ireland Senior Club Football Championship : (1) 1985
- Munster Senior Club Football Championship: (2) 1984, 1985
- Kerry Club Football Championship: (9) 1981, 1982, 1984, 1985, 1986, 1987, 1991, 1993, 1995
- Kerry Intermediate Football Championship: (3) 1976, 1979, 1981
- County League Championship (Division 1): (1) 1981
- County League Championship (Division 4): (2) 1975, 1979
- North Kerry Senior Football Championship: (6) 1980, 1988, 2002, 2007, 2020, 2021
- North Kerry Senior League: (5) 1971, 1975, 1979, 1981, 2021
- A.I.B. Club of the Year: (3) 1981, 1982, 1983
- Celebrity Bainisteoir : (1) 2010
- All-Ireland Senior Club Ladies' Football Championship: (2) 1980, 1983
