= Kenmare GAA (District Team) =

Gaelic football club in County Kerry, Ireland

Kenmare
- County: Kerry
- Colours: Blue and yellow

Playing kits
Standard colours

Senior Club Championships
	All Ireland	Munster champions	Kerry champions
Football:	0	0	2

Kenmare GAA is a Gaelic Athletic Association division in the south of County Kerry, Ireland. The division includes the town of Kenmare. It is one of nine divisions of Kerry County Board. It organizes competitions for the clubs within the division, from Under 12 up to the adult level. The winners of these competitions compete against other divisional champions to determine which club is the county champion.

In addition, the division selects football teams from the adult teams playing at intermediate and junior level, and these then compete for the Kerry Senior Football Championship.

Hurling is the weaker sport in the division, without a district team and only two clubs, Kenmare Shamrocks and Kilgarvan fielding teams.

== History ==
=== Clubs ===
The Kenmare District is the smallest such district in Kerry consisting of 4 clubs:

- Kenmare Shamrocks
- Kilgarvan
- Templenoe (Football only)
- Tousist (Football only)

=== Divisional team ===
The team competes as a joint divisional side with other clubs from the Kenmare area in the county championships. Most matches are played in Templenoe nowadays but some are played at Father Breen Park, Kenmare.

== Member clubs ==
Football clubs unless stated.

- Kenmare Shamrocks (dual)
- Kilgarvan (dual)
- Templenoe
- Tuosist

== Honours ==
- Kerry Senior Football Championship
  - (gold) Winners (2): 1974, 1987
  - (silver) Runners-Up (4): 1952, 1954, 1976, 2016
- Kerry Minor Football Championship
  - (silver) Runners-Up (2): 1959, 2012
- Kerry Under-21 Football Championship
  - (gold) Winners (3): 1985, 2014, 2017
  - (silver) Runners-Up (3): 1981, 1982, 1984

== Hurling ==
=== Grades ===
Championship	Club
Senior Championships
Senior	None
Intermediate Championships
Intermediate	Kenmare Shamrocks
Intermediate	Kilgarvan
Junior Championships
Junior	None

== Football ==
=== Grades ===
Championship	Club
Senior Championships
Senior	Kenmare Shamrocks
Senior	Templenoe
Intermediate Championships
Intermediate	None
Junior Championships
Premier Junior	None
Junior	Kilgarvan
Junior	Tuosist

== Divisional competitions ==
- Kenmare District Board Senior Football Championship (Finnegan Cup)
- Kenmare District Board Intermediate Football Championship (Murphy Cup)
- Kenmare District Board Junior Football Championship (Purcell Cup)
- Kenmare District Board Senior League (Spillane Cup)

== Finnegan Cup ==
=== Teams ===
The 4 clubs in the Kenmare District play for the Finnegan Cup in the Kenmare district board championship. As of 2023, they included:

Team	Location	Colours	Championship titles	Last championship title
Kenmare Shamrocks	Kenmare	Black and red	9	2011
Kilgarvan	Kilgarvan	Red and white	1	1961
Templenoe	Templenoe	Blue and white	10	2014
Tuosist	Tuosist	Green and red	4	2006

=== List of finals ===
Year	Winners		Runners-up	
Year	Club	Score	Club	Score
2014	Templenoe	3-10	Kenmare	0-06
2013				
2012	Templenoe	3-17	Kilgarvan	0-04
2011	Kenmare	0-08 FT, 0-11	Templenoe	0-08 FT, 0-10
2010	Templenoe	w/o	Kenmare	scr
2009				
2008				
2007				
2006	Tuosist	1-11	Templenoe	0-08
2005	Tuosist	2-07	Kenmare	0-11
2004				
2003	Kenmare		Tuosist	
2002	Tuosist			
2001	Tuosist	1-12	Templenoe	1-08
2000	Kenmare		Templenoe	
1999				
1998				
1997				
1996				
1995				
1994				
1993	Templenoe	3-11	Kenmare	1-11
1992				
1991				
1990	Templenoe	2-12	Kenmare	0-05
1989				
1988	Kenmare		Templenoe	
1987	Kenmare		Templenoe	
1986	Kenmare			
1985	Templenoe	1-08	Kenmare	1-07
1984	Templenoe	1-11	Kenmare	0-06
1983	Kenmare		Tuosist	
1982	Kenmare			
1981	Templenoe	1-06	Kenmare	0-05
1980	Templenoe	3-07	Kenmare	2-04
1979	Kenmare			
1978	Templenoe	2-13	Kenmare	2-05
1961	Kilgarvan			

=== Roll of honour ===
#	Team	Titles	Runners-up	Years won	Years runners-up
1	Templenoe	10	6	1978, 1980, 1981, 1984, 1985, 1990, 1993, 2010, 2012, 2014	1987, 1988, 2000, 2001, 2006, 2011
2	Kenmare Shamrocks	9	10	1979, 1982, 1983, 1986, 1987, 1988, 2000, 2003, 2011	1978, 1980, 1981, 1984, 1985, 1990, 1993, 2005, 2010, 2014
3	Tuosist	4	2	2001, 2002, 2005, 2006	1983, 2003
4	Kilgarvan	1	1	1961	2012

== Notable players ==
- Stephen O'Brien
- Seán O'Shea
- Paul O'Connor
- Pat Spillane
- Tom Spillane
- Mick Spillane
- Alan O'Sullivan
- Phil O'Sullivan Though from Tuosist parish Phil O'Sullivan played for Kenmare. He captained Kerry to an All Ireland Football title in 1924, played with Kenmare and won a Senior Co. Hurling medal in 1917.
- Mickey O'Sullivan Mickey "Ned" O’Sullivan won a county league medal in 1972, as well as a senior county championship in 1974. It was Kenmare's first county title ever, with a second medal following in 1987.
