= Mid Kerry GAA =

Gaelic games club in Ireland

Mid Kerry
- County: Kerry
- Colours: Green and red

Playing kits
Standard colours

Mid Kerry GAA is a Gaelic football and hurling division in County Kerry, Ireland. This division is situated in the middle region of the county, and includes towns such as Killorglin and Milltown. It is one of ten divisions of Kerry County Board. It organizes competitions for the clubs within the division, from Under 12 up to the adult level. The winners of these competitions compete against other divisional champions to determine which club is the county champion. In addition, the division selects football teams from the adult teams playing at intermediate or junior level, and these then compete for the Kerry Senior Football Championship.

== History ==
The division was created in 1947 when Laune Rangers, Castlemaine, Milltown, Tuogh, Glenbeigh and Beaufort broke away from the East Kerry division to create their own competitions.

== Honours ==
- Kerry Senior Football Championship (4): 1967, 1971, 1992, 2008
- Kerry Under-21 Football Championship (3): 1981, 2000, 2013
- Kerry Minor Football Championship (5): 1960, 1997, 1998, 2002, 2003

== Member clubs ==
Gaelic football clubs in the Mid Kerry division include:

- Beaufort
- Cromane
- Glenbeigh-Glencar
- Keel
- Laune Rangers
- Milltown/Castlemaine

== Divisional competitions ==
- Mid Kerry Senior Football Championship

== Notable players ==
- Peter Crowley
- Donnchadh Walsh
- Darren O'Sullivan
- Dan Doona
- Pat Griffin
- Brendan Lynch
- Paudie Lynch
- Aidan O'Shea
- Seán O'Sullivan
- Tom Prendergast
