= 1889 Kerry Senior Football Championship =

Gaelic football competition

- Champions: Laune Rangers (1st title)
- Runners-up: Dr. Crokes

The 1889 Kerry Senior Football Championship was the inaugural staging of the Kerry Senior Football Championship since its establishment by the Kerry County Board.

On 26 May 1889, Laune Rangers won the championship following a 0–06 to 0–03 defeat of Dr. Crokes in the final at the Kerry County Athletic Club grounds.

== Teams ==
Fifteen teams entered for the Co. Senior Football Championship – Killorglin (Laune Rangers), Tralee Mitchels, Iremore/Lixnaw, Ashill, Killorglin (Harrington's), Barraduff, Brosna, Kenmare, Killarney (Dr. Crokes), Rathmore, Listowel, Castlegregory, Castleisland, O Brennan, Kilgarvin.

== Results ==
=== Final ===
| 26 May 1889 Final | Laune Rangers | 0-06 - 0-03 | Dr. Crokes | Kerry County Athletic Club Grounds |

== Championship statistics ==
=== Miscellaneous ===
- Laune Rangers win the inaugural championship.
