= 2002 Kerry Senior Football Championship =

Gaelic football competition

- Dates: 24 May - 10 November 2002
- Teams: 20
- Sponsor: Allied Irish Bank
- Champions: Kerins O'Rahilly's (6th title); Morgan O'Shea (captain); Eoin Liston (manager)
- Runners-up: Kilcummin; Tommy Brosnan (captain); Seán Counihan (manager)
- Relegated: Killarney Legion

Tournament statistics
- Matches played: 28
- Goals scored: 37 (1.32 per match)
- Points scored: 564 (20.14 per match)
- Top scorer(s): Declan Quill (1-27)

The 2002 Kerry Senior Football Championship was the 102nd staging of the Kerry Senior Football Championship since its establishment by the Kerry County Board in 1889. The draw for the opening round fixtures took place on 9 April 2002. The championship ran from 24 May to 10 November 2002.

An Ghaeltacht entered the championship as the defending champions, however, they were beaten by Kilcummin in the semi-finals.

The final was played on 10 November 2002 at FitzGerald Stadium in Killarney, between Kerins O'Rahilly's and Kilcummin, in what was their first ever meeting in the final. Kerins O'Rahilly's won the match by 0-14 to 0-05 to claim their sixth championship title overall and a first title in 45 years.

Declan Quill was the championship's top scorer with 1-27.

== Format change ==
The championship brought a change in format with the introduction of a second chance for defeated first-round teams via a losers' round. The four semi-finalists from the previous year - An Ghaeltacht, Austin Stacks, Dr. Crokes and South Kerry - received byes to the last 16, but did not have the benefit of a second chance. Relegation was also introduced for the club team that lost all their matches.

== Results ==
=== Round 1 ===
24 May 2002 Round 1	John Mitchels	2-04 - 0-09	Kilcummin	Austin Stack Park
	F O'Connor 1-0, A Moynihan 1-0, A Gleeson 0-2, J Fitzgerald 0-1, GD Dennehy 0-1.		DJ Fleming 0-5, M O'Connor 0-3, P O'Donoghue 0-1.

24 May 2002 Round 1	Killarney Legion	0-06 - 1-11	Laune Rangers	Deerpark Grounds
	C O'Grady 0-3, J Cronin 0-1, J McGillycuddy 0-1, S Culloty 0-1.		MF Russell 1-3, P O'Sullivan 0-3, L Hassett 0-1, B O'Shea 0-1, B Gannon 0-1, C O'Connor 0-1, M McGillycuddy 0-1.

25 May 2002 Round 1	St. Brendan's	0-05 - 2-12	Feale Rangers	Ardfert Grounds
	S Wallace 0-2, S Murphy 0-2, S Hayes 0-1.		D Galvin 1-0, M Conway 1-0, B Scanlon 0-3, A Doran 0-3, P Somers 0-2, E Fitzmaurice 0-2, J Corridan 0-1, N Kennelly 0-1.

25 May 2002 Round 1	Mid Kerry	3-12 - 0-08	Shannon Rangers	Cromane Grounds
	K Foley 0-6, F Kelleher 1-1, S O'Sullivan 1-1, I Twiss 1-1, M O'Connor 0-2, D Walsh 0-1.		L Weir 0-4, O Horgan 0-1, I Blake 0-1, JP Leahy 0-1, E Hennessy 0-1.

25 May 2002 Round 1	St. Kieran's	2-14 - 0-09	Kenmare	Knocknagoshel Grounds
	L Brosnan 2-3, S McElligott 0-4, P Galvin 0-4, J McGlynn 0-2, R O'Rahilly 0-1.		J O'Neill 0-4, J Wharton 0-2, JJ Brosnan 0-1, L Lynch 0-1, F O'Sullivan 0-1.

26 May 2002 Round 1	Rathmore	2-07 - 0-06	Glenflesk	Rathbeg Grounds
	P McCarthy 1-2, S O'Neill 1-0, MD Cahill 0-3, K O'Keeffe 0-2.		P O'Donoghue 0-4, S Moynihan 0-1, D Kelly 0-1.

26 May 2002 Round 1	Castleisland Desmonds	0-06 - 2-06	Kerins O'Rahilly's	Castleisland Grounds
	J Brennan 0-2, M Lyons 0-1, M O'Connell 0-1, K Dillon 0-1, K Lynch 0-1.		D Quill 1-2, J O'Connor 0-4, G O'Brien 1-0.

26 May 2002 Round 1	West Kerry	1-12 - 0-12	East Kerry	Páirc an Aghasaigh
	J Ferriter 1-4, J Driscoll 0-2, G Farrell 0-2, J Flannery 0-1, F Smith 0-1, B Dorgan 0-1, D Heaseman 0-1.		D O'Sullivan 0-5, R McAuliffe 0-3, R O'Donovan 0-2, D Daly 0-1, K Healy 0-1.

=== Round 2 ===
31 May 2002 Round 2	Castleisland Desmonds	0-11 - 0-14	Glenflesk	FitzGerald Stadium
	K Lynch 0-7, M O'Connell 0-1, M Broderick 0-1, M Horgan 0-1, J Brennan 0-1.		P O'Donoghue 0-8, JB O'Donoghue 0-2, E O'Donoghue 0-2, S Moynihan 0-1, S Dennehy 0-1.

31 May 2002 Round 2	East Kerry	1-12 - 0-10	St Brendan's	Austin Stack Park
	R McAuliffe 0-4, R O'Donovan 0-4, P Darmody 1-0, P Kennedy 0-2, K O'Donoghue 0-1, D Murphy 0-1.		S Murphy 0-6, S Griffin 0-1, K O'Shea 0-1, M Ferris 0-1, J Best 0-1.

1 June 2002 Round 2	Kilcummin	0-13 - 1-08	Killarney Legion	FitzGerald Stadium
	K Lynch 0-5, M O'Connor 0-3, P McCarthy 0-2, B Brosnan 0-1, R O'Connor 0-1, M McCarthy 0-1.		C O'Grady 0-4, S Culloty 1-0, M O'Sullivan 0-2, J Bowler 0-1, D Pyne 0-1.

1 June 2002 Round 2	Shannon Rangers	2-09 - 0-11	Kenmare	Austin Stack Park
	L Weir 0-4, JP Leahy 1-0, K Wrenn 1-0, B Bambury 0-3, J Moroney 0-2.		J O'Neill 0-9, L Lynch 0-1, F O'Sullivan 0-1.

=== Relegation playoff ===
3 November 2002 Playoff	Castleisland Desmonds	0-13 - 0-06	Killarney Legion	Kilcummin Grounds
	K Lynch 0-4, D Flynn 0-4, M O'Connell 0-2, S Curtin 0-1, K Dillon 0-1, N Dillon 0-1.		D Culloty 0-3, K Healy 0-2, M O'Sullivan 0-1.

=== Round 3 ===
13 July 2002 Round 3	Kerins O'Rahilly's	0-14 - 0-09	West Kerry	Strand Road
	D Quill 0-7, J O'Connor 0-3, M Fitzgerald 0-2, A Daly 0-1, G Walsh 0-1.		G Farrell 0-3, J Ferriter 0-2, F Smith 0-2, B Dorgan 0-1, M Moriarty 0-1.

13 July 2002 Round 3	Dr. Crokes	1-17 - 1-04	Shannon Rangers	Lewis Road
	A O'Shea 1-4, V Casey 0-3, D Moloney 0-3, M Crowley 0-2, M Cooper 0-2, A O'Donovan 0-1, C Cooper 0-1, E Brosnan 0-1.		S Langan 1-1, P O'Donoghue 0-1, P Kelly 0-1, E Hennessy 0-1.

8 August 2002 Round 3	Rathmore	3-09 - 3-07	Mid Kerry	Rathbeg Grounds
	K O'Keeffe 1-2, D Moynihan 1-0, J Buckley 1-0, MD Cahill 0-3, M O'Riordan 0-2, M Nagle 0-1, D Casey 0-1.		S O'Sullivan 1-1, D Kelleher 1-0, D Walsh 1-0, K Foley 0-1, I Twiss 0-1, F Kelleher 0-1, K O'Brien 0-1, M O'Connor 0-1, J Gles 0-1.

9 August 2002 Round 3	Laune Rangers	0-21 - 1-11	St. Kieran's	J. P. O'Sullivan Park
	MF Russell 0-8, P O'Sullivan 0-4, B O'Shea 0-3, C O'Connor 0-2, J Lynch 0-1, J O'Shea 0-1, P Griffin 0-1, L Hassett 0-1.		P O'Rahilly 1-0, S McElligott 0-3, S Scanlon 0-2, G O'Keeffe 0-2, P Galvin 0-1, J McGlynn 0-1, S Flynn 0-1, D Dennehy 0-1.

10 August 2002 Round 3	Glenflesk	1-12 - 1-13	Kilcummin	Glenflesk Grounds
	S Moynihan 0-4, R O'Donoghue 1-0, S Dennehy 0-3, D McCarthy 0-2, T O'Sullivan 0-1, JB O'Donoghue 0-1, P O'Donoghue 0-1.		DJ Fleming 0-8, R O'Connor 1-1, B Brosnan 0-2, N Mangan 0-1, M McCarthy 0-1.

10 August 2002 Round 3	South Kerry	0-16 - 0-06	John Mitchels	Con Keating Park
	JD O'Shea 0-3, J Shanahan 0-3, M Fitzgerald 0-3, A Constable 0-2, B Teahan 0-1, R Hussey 0-1, R O'Connor 0-1, D Dwyer 0-1, J Sugrue 0-1.		P Coffey 0-2, A Moynihan 0-1, GD Dennehy 0-1, J O'Dowd 0-1, J Fitzgerald 0-1.

11 August 2002 Round 3	Feale Rangers	0-10 - 0-08	East Kerry	Finuge Grounds
	D Galvin 0-3, E Fitzmaurice 0-2, M Kearney 0-2, P Galvin 0-1, A Doran 0-1, M Conway 0-1.		D O'Sullivan 0-2, R O'Donovan 0-2, D Daly 0-1, P Kennedy 0-1, R McAuliffe 0-1, D Foley 0-1.

11 August 2002 Round 3	An Ghaeltacht	1-13 - 2-04	Austin Stacks	Gallarus Grounds
	A Mac Gearilt 0-5, D Ó Cinnéide 0-5, JJ Corduff 1-0, C Ó Cruadhlaoich 0-1, T Ó Sé 0-1, PJ Mac Gearailt 0-1.		D Aherne 2-0, B Sheehan 0-1, D Long 0-1, M Collins 0-1, K Donaghy 0-1.

=== Quarter-finals ===
4 October 2002 Quarter-final	Kerins O'Rahilly's	0-12 - 0-10	Rathmore	J. P. O'Sullivan Park
	D Quill 0-8, J O'Connor 0-1, G Walsh 0-1, M Quirke 0-1, G Molloy 0-1.		M Riordan 0-5, K O'Keeffe 0-1, D Casey 0-1, M O'Leary 0-1, P McCarthy 0-1, G Murphy 0-1.

6 October 2002 Quarter-final	An Ghaeltacht	0-12 - 0-11	South Kerry	J. P. O'Sullivan Park
	D Ó Cinnéide 0-6, A Mac Gearailt 0-3, JJ Corduff 0-2, C Mac Gearailt 0-1.		M Fitzgerald 0-8, A Constable 0-1, JD O'Shea 0-1, R Hussey 0-1/

6 October 2002 Quarter-final	Dr. Crokes	0-14 - 0-12	Laune Rangers	Austin Stack Park
	C Cooper 0-5, R Neher 0-4, M Crowley 0-2, V Cooper 0-1, D Moloney 0-1, A O'Shea 0-1.		P O'Sullivan 0-7, MF Russell 0-3, C O'Connor 0-2.

9 October 2002 Quarter-final	Kilcummin	3-08 - 0-08	Feale Rangers	Austin Stack Park
	M O'Connor 1-2, B Brosnan 1-1, R O'Connor 1-0, DJ Fleming 0-3, P O'Donoghue 0-1, S O'Leary 0-1.		D Galvin 0-3, P Galvin 0-2, M Kennelly 0-2, A Doran 0-1.

=== Semi-finals ===
27 October 2002 Semi-final	Kerins O'Rahilly's	0-10 - 0-05	Dr. Crokes	Austin Stack Park
	D Quill 0-6, J O'Connor 0-1, P O'Connor 0-1, M Quirke 0-1, M O'Shea 0-1.		A O'Shea 0-2, D Moloney 0-1, E Brosnan 0-1, B McMahon 0-1.

27 October 2002 Semi-final	Kilcummin	1-11 - 0-12	An Ghaeltacht	Austin Stack Park
	DJ Fleming 0-4, M McCarthy 1-0, M O'Connor 0-2, N Mangan 0-1, R O'Connor 0-1, SB Doherty 0-1, D Brosnan 0-1, E O'Donoghue 0-1.		D Ó Cinnéide 0-6, A Mac Gearailt 0-3, C Ó Cruadhlaoich 0-1, D Ó Sé 0-1, R Mac Gearailt 0-1.

=== Final ===
10 November 2002 Final	Kerins O'Rahilly's	0-14 - 0-05	Kilcummin	FitzGerald Stadium
	G O'Brien and D Quill (2f) 0-4 each; J O'Connor and G Molloy 0-2 each; A Murphy and T O'Sullivan 0-1 each.		DJ Fleming 0-3f; E O'Donoghue (f) and M McCarthy 0-1 each.	Referee: P Lyons (Laune Rangers)

== Championship statistics ==
=== Top scorers ===
Overall

Rank	Player	Club	Tally	Total	Matches	Average
1	Declan Quill	Kerins O'Rahilly's	1-27	30	5	6.00
2	D. J. Fleming	Kilcummin	0-23	23	5	4.60
3	Mike Frank Russell	Laune Rangers	1-14	17	3	5.66
3	Dara Ó Cinnéide	An Ghaeltacht	0-17	17	3	5.66
5	Pa O'Sullivan	Laune Rangers	0-14	14	3	4.66
6	Michael O'Connor	Kilcummin	1-10	13	5	2.40
6	Paud O'Donoghue	Glenflesk	0-13	13	3	4.33
6	James O'Neill	Kenmare	0-13	13	2	6.50
9	Kevin Lynch	Castleisland Desmonds	0-12	12	3	4.00
10	Maurice Fitzgerald	South Kerry	0-11	11	2	5.50
10	Aodán Mac Gearailt	An Ghaeltacht	0-11	11	3	3.66
10	John O'Connor	Kerins O'Rahilly's	0-11	11	5	2.20

In a single game

Rank	Player	Club	Tally	Total	Opposition
1	Liam Brosnan	St. Kieran's	2-03	9	Kenmare
1	James O'Neill	Kenmare	0-09	9	Shannon Rangers
3	Paud O'Donoghue	Glenflesk	0-08	8	Castleisland Desmonds
3	Mike Frank Russell	Laune Rangers	0-08	8	St. Kieran's
3	D. J. Fleming	Kilcummin	0-08	8	Glenflesk
3	Declan Quill	Kerins O'Rahilly's	0-08	8	Rathmore
3	Maurice Fitzgerald	South Kerry	0-08	8	An Ghaeltacht
8	Jack Ferriter	West Kerry	1-04	7	East Kerry
8	Aidan O'Shea	Dr. Crokes	1-04	7	Shannon Rangers
8	Kevin Lynch	Castleisland Desmonds	0-07	7	Glenflesk
8	Declan Quill	Kerins O'Rahilly's	0-07	7	West Kerry
8	Pa O'Sullivan	Laune Rangers	0-07	7	Dr. Crokes

=== Miscellaneous ===
- Kerins O'Rahilly's won a first title in 45 years.
- Kerins O'Rahilly's qualify for the final for the first time since 1963.
- Kilcummin qualify for the final for the first time since 1913.
