= 2008 Kerry Senior Football Championship =

Gaelic football competition

- Dates: 17 May - 30 November 2008
- Teams: 20
- Sponsor: Allied Irish Bank
- Champions: Mid Kerry (4th title); Mike Burke (captain); James Sheehan (manager)
- Runners-up: Kerins O'Rahilly's; Declan Quill (captain); Jack O'Connor (manager)
- Relegated: John Mitchels

Tournament statistics
- Matches played: 33
- Goals scored: 63 (1.91 per match)
- Points scored: 695 (21.06 per match)
- Top scorer(s): Declan Quill (1-33)

The 2008 Kerry Senior Football Championship was the 108th staging of the Kerry Senior Football Championship since its establishment by the Kerry County Board in 1889. The draw for the opening round fixtures took place on 15 March 2008. The championship ran from 17 May to 30 November 2008.

Feale Rangers entered the championship as the defending champions, however, they were beaten by South Kerry in the quarter-finals.

The final replay was played on 30 November 2008 at FitzGerald Stadium in Killarney, between Mid Kerry and Kerins O'Rahilly's in what was their first ever meeting in the final. Mid Kerry won the match by 1-07 to 0-09 to claim their fourth championship title overall and a first title in 16 years.

Declan Quill was the championship's top scorer with 1-33.

== Team changes ==
=== To Championship ===
Promoted from the Kerry Intermediate Football Championship

- None

=== From Championship ===
Relegated to the Kerry Intermediate Football Championship

- Milltown/Castlemaine

== Results ==
=== Preliminary round ===
17 May 2008 Preliminary round	Kerins O'Rahilly's	1-14 - 3-12	Dr. Crokes	Austin Stack Park
	D Quill 0-5, G Duffy 1-0, BJ Walsh 0-3, BJ Keane 0-3, D Moran 0-2, R Molloy 0-1.		C Cooper 2-3, B Looney 1-1, S Doolan 0-2, J Buckley 0-2, J Fleming 0-2, J Doolan 0-1, D Casey 0-1.

18 May 2008 Preliminary round	Ardfert	1-08 - 0-13	Laune Rangers	Lerrig Grounds
	J Egan 0-4, F Wallace 1-0, Darren Wallace 0-1, Damian Wallace 0-1, Stephen Wallace 0-, B Moloney 0-1.		MF Russell 0-5, L Hassett 0-3, K Flynn 0-3, P Sheehan 0-1, C O'Connor 0-1.

=== Round 1 ===
17 May 2008 Round 1	Austin Stacks	0-14 - 1-09	Killarney Legion	Austin Stack Park
	G O'Connell 0-7, D Bohane 0-2, S Carroll 0-2, J Kinsella 0-2, K Donaghy 0-1.		M O'Sullivan 1-3, J O'Donoghue 0-4, J Lyne 0-2.

17 May 2008 Round 1	South Kerry	0-19 - 0-13	St. Kieran's	Con Keating Park
	R Hussey 0-8, B Sheehan 0-4, P Curran 0-2, J Sugrue 0-1, Declan O'Sullivan 0-1, D O'Dwyer 0-1, R O'Connor 0-1, D Fenton 0-1.		T O'Connor 0-3, D Walsh 0-3, P Reidy 0-2, K Brennan 0-2, D O'Shea 0-2, P McCarthy 0-1.

18 May 2008 Round 1	Shannon Rangers	1-06 - 1-08	Mid Kerry	Ballylongford Grounds
	M Boyle 1-2, O Horgan 0-3, A Boyle 0-1.		D Kelliher 1-0, G Sayers 0-3, A O'Shea 0-2, F Griffin 0-1, M Burke 0-1, S O'Sullivan 0-1.

18 May 2008 Round 1	John Mitchels	1-09 - 1-12	Dingle	Austin Stack Park
	P O'Donoghue 1-3, A O'Donoghue 0-3, P Kelly 0-1, B Costello 0-1, S O'Mahony 0-1.		D Geaney 0-5, A O'Neill 1-0, D Ryan 0-3, M Evans 0-3, C Moriarty 0-1.

18 May 2008 Round 1	St. Brendan's	0-05 - 4-14	East Kerry	Lerrig Grounds
	L O'Sullivan 0-3, S Brennan 0-1, D O'Callaghan 0-1.		M O'Donoghue 2-4, N O'Mahony 2-3, D O'Connor 0-2, D O'Sullivan 0-1, D Daly 0-1, M Murphy 0-1, JP Brosnan 0-1, J Falvey 0-1.

18 May 2008 Round 1	West Kerry	1-09 - 1-13	Kenmare	Páirc an Chaisleáin
	A O'Donnell 1-1, D O'Sullivan 0-4, G Farrell 0-2, C O'Sullivan 0-2.		A O'Sullivan 1-1, MT O'Sullivan 0-3, P O'Connor 0-3, M Crowley 0-2, J Healy 0-2, M McNally 0-1, C Brosnan 0-1.

25 May 2008 Round 1	Laune Rangers	0-14 - 2-06	Kilcummin	J. P. O'Sullivan Park
	MF Russell 0-7, L Hassett 0-2, C O'Connor 0-2, K Flynn 0-2, S McSweeney 0-1.		DJ Fleming 0-4, J O'Sullivan 1-0, E O'Donoghue 1-0, R O'Connor 0-1, K O'Donoghue 0-1.

27 May 2008 Round 1	Dr. Crokes	2-07 - 1-08	Rathmore	FitzGerald Stadium
	J Doolan 1-2, C Cooper 0-4, E Brosnan 1-0, K O'Leary 0-1.		M O'Riordan 0-6, K O'Sullivan 1-0, K Cahill 0-1, MJ Kelliher 0-1.

=== Round 2 ===
25 May 2008 Round 2	West Kerry	0-15 - 2-08	Shannon Rangers	Ballylongford Grounds
	A O'Donnell 0-4, T Farrell 0-3, D O'Sullivan 0-3, S Hennessy 0-3, E Kennedy 0-1, C O'Sullivan 0-1.		E Mangan 1-3, M Boyle 1-1, O Horgan 0-2, L Boyle 0-1, P Kennelly 0-1.

25 May 2008 Round 2	Kerins O'Rahilly's	4-10 - 1-06	Killarney Legion	FitzGerald Stadium
	BJ Walsh 2-0, T Walsh 1-2, T O'Sullivan 1-1, D Quill 0-4, D Moran 0-2, J O'Connor 0-1.		J O'Donoghue 1-2, M O'Sullivan 0-2, J Lyne 0-1, K Breen 0-1.

26 May 2008 Round 2	St. Kieran's	3-11 - 1-10	St. Brendan's	Cordal Grounds
	T O'Connor 1-5, S Curtin 2-0, M O'Connell 0-4, P McCarthy 0-1, D Walsh 0-1.		E O'Neill 1-1, L O'Sullivan 0-4, B Poff 0-2, C Daly 0-2, S Brosnan 0-1.

1 June 2008 Round 2	Kilcummin	2-11 - 0-09	John Mitchels	Kilcummin Grounds
	DJ Fleming 0-6, D Brosnan 1-1, M O'Connor 1-0, P O'Donoghue 0-2, E O'Donoghue 0-1, R O'Connor 0-1.		P Kelly 0-4, P O'Donoghue 0-3, S O'Mahony 0-1, A O'Donoghue 0-1.

3 June 2008 Round 2	Rathmore	1-13 - 1-05	Ardfert	Rathbeg Grounds
	E Lawlor 1-2, G Murphy 0-5, M O'Riordan 0-2, A O'Mahony 0-2, I Kelleher 0-1, J Buckley 0-1.		Damian Wallace 1-0, J Egan 0-3, M Ferris 0-1, B Flaherty 0-1.

=== Relegation playoffs ===
11 October 2008 Playoff	Killarney Legion	0-15 - 1-08	Ardfert	Páirc de Búrca
	J O'Donoghue 0-4, M O'Sullivan 0-4, E Murphy 0-2, K Breen 0-1, J McGillycuddy 0-1, D Murphy 0-1, D Twomey 0-1, S Culloty 0-1.		J Egan 0-4, C Wallace 1-0, S Griffin 0-3, Stephen Wallace 0-1.

18 October 2008 Playoff	John Mitchels	1-08 - 2-14	Ardfert	Strand Road
	P O'Donoghue 0-4, R O'Sullivan 1-0, W Conway 0-1, M Cronin 0-1, A O'Donoghue 0-1, P Kelly 0-1,		Damien Wallace 2-5, J Egan 0-4, S Griffin 0-2, Stephen Wallace 0-2, J Dowling 0-1.

=== Round 3 ===
4 October 2008 Round 3	An Ghaeltacht	1-07 - 1-14	Feale Rangers	Gallarus Grounds
	SM Ó Conchúir 1-3, M Mac Gearailt 0-1, T Ó Sé 0-1, T Ó Conchúir 0-1, B Breathnach 0-1.		N Kennelly 0-5, B Scanlon 1-1, L Keane 0-3, A Maher 0-2, K Quirke 0-1, M Scannell 0-1, B O'Connell 0-1.

4 October 2008 Round 3	Kilcummin	0-07 - 0-09	South Kerry	Kilummin Grounds
	E O'Donoghue 0-3, DJ Fleming 0-2, B Brosnan 0-1, K O'Donoghue 0-1.		B Sheehan 0-2, Declan O'Sullivan 0-2, A O'Sullivan 0-1, R Hussey 0-1, B Kelly 0-1, R O'Connor 0-1.,

5 October 2008 Round 3	Laune Rangers	0-10 - 1-06	East Kerry	J. P. O'Sullivan Park
	MF Russell 0-3, L Hassett 0-2, J Sheehan 0-1, P Joy 0-1, P O'Sullivan 0-1, G Mahony 0-1, S McSweeney 0-1.		A Garnett 1-0, N O'Mahony 0-2, M O'Donoghue 0-2, J Sheehan 0-1, JP Brosnan 0-1.

5 October 2008 Round 3	Kenmare	0-15 - 1-10	Austin Stacks	Kenmare Grounds
	P O'Connor 0-8, MT O'Sulivan 0-2, D O'Connor 0-2, L O'Shea 0-2, C Brosnan 0-1.		D Long 1-4, K Donaghy 0-2, G O'Connell 0-2, P Henneberry 0-1, P Mangan 0-1.

5 October 2008 Round 3	Mid Kerry	1-14 - 0-08	Dr. Crokes	J. P. O'Sullivan Park
	K Foley 1-3, S O'Sullivan 0-4, D O'Sullivan 0-3, F Griffin 0-2, M Burke 0-1, D Walsh 0-1.		C Cooper 0-3, J Doolan 0-1, J Buckley 0-1, G Tucker 0-1, J Fleming 0-1, S Doolan 0-1.

5 October 2008 Round 3	St. Kieran's	0-16 - 0-13 (aet)	West Kerry	Austin Stack Park
	T McGoldrick 0-5, P McCarthy 0-3, T O'Connor 0-3, M Coakley 0-2, EJ O'Donoghue 0-2, T O'Mahony 0-1.		G Farrell 0-7, S O'Sullivan 0-1, M O'Shea 0-1, E Kennedy 0-1, C O'Sullivan 0-1, JB Spillane 0-1, A Fitzgerald 0-1.

5 October 2008 Round 3	Kerins O'Rahilly's	0-15 - 1-09 (aet)	Rathmore	Austin Stack Park
	D Quill 0-7, T Walsh 0-3, BJ Keane 0-2, John O'Connor 0-2, T O'Sullivan 0-1.		D Casey 1-2, M O'Riordan 0-3, E Lawlor 0-2, D O'Sullivan 0-1, G Murphy 0-1.

- Dingle received a bye in this round.

=== Quarter-finals ===
12 October 2008 Quarter-final	Mid Kerry	1-15 - 2-09	Kenmare	FitzGerald Stadium
	S O'Sullivan 1-2, K Foley 0-4, D Walsh 0-2, D O'Sullivan 0-2, L Sheehan 0-2, G Sayers 0-1, F Griffin 0-1, C Kelliher 0-1.		P O'Connor 1-5, L O'Shea 1-0, C Brosnan 0-1, A Sullivan 0-1, J Healy 0-1, M Crowley 0-1.

12 October 2008 Quarter-final	Laune Rangers	2-14 - 1-14	St. Kieran's	FitzGerald Stadium
	MF Russell 0-9, L Hassett 1-1, K Flynn 1-0, S Foley 0-2, P Crowley 0-1, C O'Connor 0-1.		T McGoldrick 1-8, J O'Donoghue 0-5, F McAuliffe 0-1.

12 October 2008 Quarter-final	Kerins O'Rahilly's	2-09 - 0-09	Dingle	Austin Stack Park
	D Quill 1-3, T O'Sullivan 1-1, BJ Keane 0-2, BJ Walsh 0-2, J O'Connor 0-1.		D Geaney 0-4, D Ryan 0-3, P Geaney 0-2.

12 October 2008 Quarter-final	South Kerry	0-10 - 0-07	Feale Rangers	Austin Stack Park
	B Sheehan 0-8, R Hussey 0-1, R O'Connor 0-1.		N Kennelly 0-2, E Galvin 0-2, L Keane 0-1, M Scannell 0-1, B Scanlan 0-1.

=== Semi-finals ===
26 October 2008 Semi-final	Mid Kerry	0-13 - 0-05	Laune Rangers	FitzGerald Stadium
	K Foley 0-6, D O'Sullivan 0-2, S O'Sullivan 0-2, D Walsh 0-2, G Sayers 0-1.		MF Russell 0-4, L Hassett 0-1.

26 October 2008 Semi-final	Kerins O'Rahilly's	2-13 - 2-13 (aet)	South Kerry	FitzGerald Stadium
	BJ Walsh 1-3, D Moran 1-2, D Quill 0-3, T Walsh 0-2, BJ Keane 0-1, B Quill 0-1, J O'Connor 0-1.		Aidan O'Sullivan 2-0, B Sheehan 0-5, R Hussey 0-4, R O'Connor 0-2, Declan O'Sullivan 0-1, D Dwyer 0-1.

1 November 2008 Semi-final	Kerins O'Rahilly's	0-12 - 0-11	South Kerry	FitzGerald Stadium
	D Quill 0-5, BJ Walsh 0-2, D Moran 0-2, T Walsh 0-2, J O'Connor 0-1.		B Sheehan 0-4, R Hussey 0-3, D O'Sullivan 0-2, D Dwyer 0-1, R O'Connor 0-1.

=== Final ===
16 November 2008 Final	Mid Kerry	2-08 - 2-08	Kerins O'Rahilly's	FitzGerald Stadium
	K Foley 2-2, Darran O'Sullivan 0-4, S O'Sullivan 0-1, D Kelliher 0-1.		BJ Walsh 1-2, D Moran 0-4, T Walsh 1-0, J O'Connor 0-1, D Quill 0-1.

30 November 2008 Final replay	Mid Kerry	1-07 - 0-09	Kerins O'Rahilly's	FitzGerald Stadium
	A O'Shea 1-1 (1-0 pen), Darran O'Sullivan 0-3 (0-1f), K Foley 0-2 (0-1f), S O'Sullivan 0-1 (f).		D Quill 0-5 (0-3f), T Walsh 0-3, D Moran 0-1.	Referee: P O'Sullivan

== Championship statistics ==
=== Top scorers ===
Overall

Rank	Player	Club	Tally	Total	Matches	Average
1	Declan Quill	Kerins O'Rahilly's	1-33	36	8	4.50
2	Mike Frank Russell	Laune Rangers	0-28	28	5	5.60
3	Kieran Foley	Mid Kerry	3-17	26	6	4.33
4	Barry John Walsh	Kerins O'Rahilly's	4-12	24	8	3.00
5	Bryan Sheehan	South Kerry	0-23	23	5	4.60
6	Paul O'Connor	Kenmare	1-16	19	3	6.33
7	Tommy Walsh	Kerins O'Rahilly's	2-12	18	8	2.25
8	Ronan Hussey	South Kerry	0-17	17	5	3.40
9	Colm Cooper	Dr. Crokes	2-10	16	3	5.33
9	Tom McGoldrick	St. Kieran's	1-13	16	4	4.00
9	David Moran	Kerins O'Rahilly's	1-13	16	8	2.00

In a single game

Rank	Player	Club	Tally	Total	Opposition
1	Damian Wallace	Ardfert	2-05	11	John Mitchels
1	Tom McGoldrick	St. Kieran's	1-08	11	Laune Rangers
3	Mike O'Donoghue	East Kerry	2-04	10	St. Brendan's
4	Colm Cooper	Dr. Crokes	2-03	9	Kerins O'Rahilly's
4	Niall O'Mahony	East Kerry	2-03	9	St. Brendan's
4	Mike Frank Russell	Laune Rangers	0-09	9	St. Kieran's
7	Kieran Foley	Mid Kerry	2-02	8	Kerins O'Rahilly's
7	Tom O'Connor	St. Kieran's	1-05	8	St. Brendan's
7	Paul O'Connor	Kenmare	1-05	8	Mid Kerry
7	Bryan Sheehan	South Kerry	0-08	8	Feale Rangers
7	Ronan Hussey	South Kerry	0-08	8	St. Kieran's
7	Paul O'Connor	Paul O'Connor	0-08	8	Austin Stacks

=== Miscellaneous ===
- Mid Kerry win a first title in 16 years.
- Mid Kerry qualify for the final for the first time since 1992.
- Kerins O'Rahilly's qualify for the final for the first time since 2002.
- The final goes to a replay for the first time since 2003.
- Kerins O'Rahilly's play in the Munster Senior Club Football Championship.
- Ten time winners John Mitchels are relegated from senior level for the first time.
- Despite winning the 2007 Intermediate Championship Annascaul choose not to move up to senior.
