= 2003 Kerry Senior Football Championship =

Gaelic football tournament

- Dates: 18 May - 26 October 2003
- Teams: 20
- Sponsor: Allied Irish Bank
- Champions: An Ghaeltacht (2nd title); Darragh Ó Sé (captain); Fergal Ó Sé (manager)
- Runners-up: Laune Rangers; Pa O'Sullivan (captain); John Evans (manager)
- Relegated: Castleisland Desmonds

Tournament statistics
- Matches played: 32
- Goals scored: 56 (1.75 per match)
- Points scored: 638 (19.94 per match)
- Top scorer(s): Kieran Foley (1-22)

The 2003 Kerry Senior Football Championship was the 103rd staging of the Kerry Senior Football Championship since its establishment by the Kerry County Board in 1889.

Kerins O'Rahilly's entered the championship as the defending champions, however, they were beaten by Mid Kerry in the quarter-finals.

The final replay was played on 26 October 2003 at Austin Stack Park in Tralee, between An Ghaeltacht and Laune Rangers. An Ghaeltacht won the match by 0-12 to 2-04 to claim their second championship title overall and a first title in two years.

Mid Kerry's Kieran Foley was the championship's top scorer with 1-22.

== Team changes ==
=== To Championship ===
Promoted from the Kerry Intermediate Football Championship

- Listowel Emmets

=== From Championship ===
Relegated to the Kerry Intermediate Football Championship

- Killarney Legion

== Club section ==
=== Club round 1 ===
| 24 May 2002 Round 1 | Dr. Crokes | 2-07 - 2-13 | Laune Rangers | Lewis Road |
| | M Crowley 2-2, A O'Shea 0-2, E Brosnan 0-1, K Brosnan 0-1, J Jones 0-1. | | MF Russell 0-7, J O'Brien 1-1, C O'Connor 0-4, J Sheehan 1-0, B Gannon 0-1. |

| 25 May 2003 Round 1 | Listowel Emmets | 3-04 - 1-12 | Glenflesk | Austin Stack Park |
| | N Kennelly 2-0, B Scanlon 1-2, F Reen 0-1, D Galvin 0-1. | | P O'Donoghue 0-7, O Favier 1-2, J Crowley 0-2, T O'Sullivan 0-1. |

| 25 May 2003 Round 1 | John Mitchels | 0-08 - 0-14 | Austin Stacks | Austin Stack Park |
| | G Dennehy 0-4, J Fitzgerald 0-3, A Moynihan 0-1. | | D Aherne 0-8, M Collins 0-2, P Laide 0-2, TJ Hogan 0-2. |

| 25 May 2003 Round 1 | Rathmore | 2-10 - 0-10 | Castleisland Desmonds | FitzGerald Stadium |
| | T Cronin 1-1, J Buckley 1-0, K O'Keeffe 0-3, M O'Riordan 0-3, N O'Mahony 0-1, D O'Keeffe 0-1, J O'Sullivan 0-1. | | M O'Connell 0-3, J Flynn 0-3, K O'Sullivan 0-1, J Brennan 0-1, M Broderick 0-1, K Lynch 0-1. |

=== Club round 1 losers' round ===
| 31 May 2003 Losers' group | John Mitchels | 1-10 - 0-08 | Catsleisland Desmonds | Boherbee Grounds |
| | B Dennehy 0-4, A Gleeson 1-0, A Moynihan 0-3, GD Dennehy 0-2, P Coffey 0-1. | | K Lynch 0-5, B O'Neill 0-2, K O'Sullivan 0-1. |

| 31 May 2003 Losers' group | Dr. Crokes | 3-18 - 1-07 | Listowel Emmets | Lewis Road |
| | M O'Grady 2-3, C Cooper 1-5, A O'Shea 0-3, M Crowley 0-3, J Jones 0-2, A O'Donovan 0-1, E Kavanagh 0-1. | | D Galvin 0-6, B Scanlon 1-0, N Stack 0-1. |

=== Relegation playoff ===
| 21 June 2003 Losers' group | Listowel Emmets | 0-10 - 1-05 | Catsleisland Desmonds | Austin Stack Park |
| | D Galvin 0-4, M Kennelly 0-2, N Kennelly 0-2, B Doyle 0-1, B Scanlon 0-1. | | J Lyons 1-0, M O'Connell 0-1, K Lynch 0-1, DD Kerins 0-1, J Brennan 0-1, M Horgan 0-1. |

== Division section ==
=== Division round 1 ===
| 18 May 2003 Round 1 | Kenmare | 1-18 - 3-05 | St. Brendan's | Templenoe Grounds |
| | B O'Neill 0-5, J O'Neill 0-4, E O'Driscoll 1-0, S Ryan 0-3, J O'Sullivan 0-2, S O'Shea 0-1, F O'Sullivan 0-1, TP O'Connor 0-1, L Lynch 0-1. | | S Wallace 1-3, S Hayes 1-2, J Clifford 1-0. |

| 19 May 2003 Round 1 | Mid Kerry | 2-10 - 1-05 | Shannon Rangers | Ballylongford Grounds |
| | M O'Connor 1-2, K Foley 0-4, D Doona 1-0, D Walsh 0-1, J O'Connor 0-1. | | L Boyle 1-1, D Kiely 0-3, T Foley 0-1. |

=== Division round 1 losers' group ===
| 24 May 2003 Round 3 | Shannon Rangers | 2-07 - 0-09 | St. Brendan's | Austin Stack Park |
| | P Kelly 1-3, T Foley 1-1, S McGinley 0-2, M Hannon 0-1. | | S Wallace 0-5, O McCarthy 0-1, S McMahon 0-1, S Hayes 0-1. |

=== Division round 2 ===
| 24 May 2003 Round 2 | Mid Kerry | 1-14 - 1-07 | Kenmare | Cromane Grounds |
| | I Twiss 1-2, M O'Connor 0-3, S O'Sullivan 0-3, K Foley 0-2, F Griffin 0-1, G O'Connor 0-1, W Harmon 0-1, D Doona 0-1. | | JA O'Sullivan 1-1, B O'Neill 0-2, J O'Neill 0-2, S Ryan 0-1, TP O'Connor 0-1. |

| 25 May 2003 Round 2 | Feale Rangers | 0-10 - 0-18 | East Kerry | FitzGerald Stadium |
| | P Galvin 0-6, E Bowler 0-2, P Somers 0-1, E Breen 0-1. | | R O'Donovan 0-7, R McAuliffe 0-5, D O'Connor 0-3, F McAuliffe 0-1, C Gleeson 0-1. |

| 25 May 2003 Round 2 | South Kerry | 1-08 - 1-09 | West Kerry | Con Keating Park |
| | R Hussey 1-0, D O'Sullivan 0-3, JD O'Shea 0-2, M Fitzgerald 0-1, R O'Connor 0-1, J Shanahan 0-1. | | D O'Sullivan 1-1, S Farrell 0-3, G Farrell 0-3, T Griffin 0-2. |

| 1 June 2003 Round 2 | St. Kieran's | 1-10 - 1-08 | Shannon Rangers | Tarbert Grounds |
| | EJ O'Donoghue 1-0, P Galvin 0-2, T McGoldrick 0-2, J Dennehy 0-2, S Flynn 0-1, K Murphy 0-1, S Scanlon 0-1, R O'Rahilly 0-1. | | M Hannon 1-2, D Kiely 0-3, G O'Brien 0-2, A Boyle 0-1. |

=== Division round 2 losers' group ===
| 1 June 2008 Losers' group | South Kerry | 0-11 - 0-09 | Feale Rangers | Con Keating Park |
| | JD O'Shea 0-4, J Shanahan 0-4, D O'Sullivan 0-1, C O'Connor 0-1, M Fitzgerald 0-1. | | J Mulvihill 0-4, P Galvin 0-2, E Fitzmaurice 0-2, E Bowler 0-1. |

| 29 June 2008 Losers' group | Shannon Rangers | 0-17 - 2-04 | Kenmare | Beaufort Grounds |
| | S McGinley 0-4, P Kelly 0-4, K Mulvihill 0-3, J McMahon 0-2, O Horgan 0-2, B O'Sullivan 0-1, P O'Hanlon 0-1. | | E O'Driscoll 1-0, B O'Neill 1-0, S Ryan 0-3, J O'Neill 0-1. |

== Knockout stage ==
=== Round 3 ===
| 21 June 2003 Round 3 | Rathmore | 1-07 - 0-12 | Kilcummin | Rathbeg Grounds |
| | J Buckley 1-0, J Murphy 0-3, M O'Riordan 0-2, MD Cahill 0-1, T O'Sullivan 0-1. | | DJ Fleming 0-6, M McCarthy 0-2, P Kelly 0-1, C Lenihan 0-1, S Lenihan 0-1, R O'Connor 0-1. |

| 22 June 2003 Round 3 | West Kerry | 0-11 - 1-05 | Austin Stacks | Páirc an Chaisleáin |
| | G Farrell 0-6, T Griffin 0-1, S Farrell 0-1, D O'Sullivan 0-1, B Hannafin 0-1, J Ferriter 0-1. | | K Donaghy 1-0, D Ahern 0-1, M Finn 0-1, D Bohane 0-1, D Long 0-1, F Smith 0-1. |

| 22 June 2003 Round 3 | An Ghaeltacht | 1-11 - 0-07 | Glenflesk | Gallarus Grounds |
| | R Mac Gearailt 1-4, D Ó Cinnéide 0-3, C Ó Dubhda 0-1, D Ó Sé 0-1, C Ó Cathasaigh 0-1, A Mac Gearailt 0-1. | | P O'Donoghue 0-3, JB O'Donoghue 0-1, S Dennehy 0-1, J Crowley 0-1, J O'Sullivan 0-1. |

| 22 June 2003 Round 3 | East Kerry | 2-16 - 2-08 | St. Kieran's | Paddy O'Leary Memorial Park |
| | F McAuliffe 1-1, D O'Sullivan 0-4, R O'Donovan 0-4, R McAuliffe 0-4, G Murphy 1-0, D O'Connor 0-3. | | T McGoldrick 0-4, J Downey 0-3, J O'Donnell 1-0, S Flynn 1-0, EJ O'Donoghue 0-1. |

| 22 June 2003 Round 3 | Dr Crokes | 0-10 - 0-11 | Mid Kerry | Lewis Road |
| | C Cooper 0-6, J Jones 0-1, E Brosnan 0-1, J Fleming 0-1, M Crowley 0-1. | | K Foley 0-4, D Doona 0-2, M Connor 0-2, M Burke 0-1, G O'Connor 0-1, S O'Sullivan 0-1. |

| 29 June 2003 Round 3 | John Mitchels | 1-09 - 2-11 | South Kerry | Boherbee Grounds |
| | F O'Brien 0-5, J Fitzgerald 1-0, B Dennehy 0-1, S McMahon 0-1, F O'Connor 0-1, E Kelliher 0-1. | | M Fitzgerald 1-2, D O'Sullivan 0-5, J Sugrue 1-1, J Shanahan 0-1, R O'Connor 0-1, JD O'Shea 0-1. |

| 29 June 2003 Round 3 | Kerins O'Rahilly's | 2-11 - 1-12 | Listowel Emmets | Ballylongford Grounds |
| | J O'Connor 1-4, G O'Brien 1-3, D Quill 0-4. | | D Galvin 0-4, T Walsh 1-0, M Kennelly 0-2, B Scanlon 0-2, N Kennelly 0-1, M Whelan 0-1, P Buckley 0-1, L Keane 0-1. |

| 20 July 2003 Round 3 | Laune Rangers | 0-10 - 0-08 | Shannon Rangers | Tarbert Grounds |
| | MF Russell 0-5, L Hassett 0-3, G O'Brien 0-1, J Sheehan 0-1. | | K Mulvihill 0-3, D Lanigan 0-1, G O'Brien 0-1, L Boyle 0-1, E O'Connell 0-1, B O'Grady 0-1. |

=== Quarter-finals ===
| 30 August 2003 Quarter-final | South Kerry | 1-13 - 1-09 | Kilcummin | J. P. O'Sullivan Park |
| | J Shanahan 1-3, A O'Sullivan 0-3, R O'Connor 0-2, B Teehan 0-1, C O'Connor 0-1, D O'Sullivan 0-1, K Moran 0-1, M Fitzgerald 0-1. | | DJ Fleming 1-3, E O'Donoghue 0-2, SB O'Doherty 0-2, S Lenihan 0-1, P Kelly 0-1. |

| 31 August 2003 Quarter-final | Mid Kerry | 2-12 - 0-10 | Kerins O'Rahilly's | FitzGerald Stadium |
| | K Foley 1-7, S O'Sullivan 1-1, M O'Connor 0-2, G O'Connor 0-1, L O'Shea 0-1. | | D Quill 0-6, J O'Connor 0-2, G O'Brien 0-1, J O'Connor 0-1. |

| 6 September 2003 Quarter-final | Laune Rangers | 1-11 - 1-09 | West Kerry | Austin Stack Park |
| | B Gannon 1-0, MF Russell 0-3, P O'Sullivan 0-3, B O'Shea 0-2, S Foley 0-1, J O'Brien 0-1, J Lynch 0-1. | | G Farrell 0-4, T Griffin 1-0, B Hannafin 0-2, J Ferriter 0-2, S Farrell 0-1. |

| 7 September 2003 Quarter-final | An Ghaeltacht | 1-15 - 0-08 | East Kerry | Austin Stack Park |
| | D Ó Cinnéide 0-8, A Mac Gearailt 0-3, R Mac Gearailt 1-1, T Ó Conchúir 0-2, C Ó Dubhda 0-1. | | R O'Donovan 0-3, R McAuliffe 0-2, D O'Sullivan 0-2, L Murphy 0-1. |

=== Semi-finals ===
| 21 September 2003 Semi-final | An Ghaeltacht | 0-14 - 1-10 | Mid Kerry | FitzGerald Stadium |
| | D Ó Cinnéide 0-4, C Ó Dubhda 0-3, F Ó Sé 0-1, M Ó Sé 0-1, T Ó Sé 0-1, D Ó Sé 0-1, R Mac Gearailt 0-1, A Mac Gearailt 0-1, C Ó Cruadhlaoich 0-1. | | K Foley 0-5, A Giles 1-0, D Doona 0-2, L O'Shea 0-1, G O'Connor 0-1, D Walsh 0-1. |

| 21 September 2003 Semi-final | Laune Rangers | 1-08 - 0-09 | South Kerry | FitzGerald Stadium |
| | J Sheehan 1-1, P O'Sullivan 0-3, C O'Connor 0-1, MF Russell 0-1, B Gannon 0-1, J Lynch 0-1. | | M Fitzgerald 0-5, J Shanahan 0-2, D O'Sullivan 0-1, R O'Connor 0-1. |

=== Final ===
| 12 October 2003 Final | An Ghaeltacht | 0-10 - 0-10 | Laune Rangers | Austin Stack Park |
| | D O Cinnéide (0-4, 3 frees), A Mac Gearailt (0-2), C Ó Cruadhlaoich (0-2), R Mac Gearailt, B Breathnach (0-1 each). | | MF Russell (0-7, 5 frees), P O'Sullivan (0-2), B Gannon (0-1) | Referee: T Lynch (Kerins O'Rahilly's) |

| 26 October 2003 Final replay | An Ghaeltacht | 0-12 - 2-04 | Laune Rangers | Austin Stack Park |
| | A Mac Gearailt (0-3), D Ó Cinnéide (0-3, 2 frees), M Ó Sé, T Ó Sé, D Ó Sé, P Ó Cuinn, T Ó Conchuir, C Ó Cruadhlaoich (0-1 each). | | J Lynch (1-0), G O’Brien (1-0), P O’Sullivan (0-2, 1 frees), B Gannon (0-2). | Referee: T Lynch (Kerins O'Rahilly's) |

== Championship statistics ==
=== Top scorers ===
Overall

| Rank | Player | Club | Tally | Total | Matches | Average |
|---|---|---|---|---|---|---|
| 1 | Kieran Foley | Mid Kerry | 1-22 | 25 | 5 | 5.00 |
| 2 | Mike Frank Russell | Laune Rangers | 0-23 | 23 | 6 | 3.83 |
| 3 | Dara Ó Cinnéide | An Ghaeltacht | 0-22 | 22 | 5 | 4.40 |
| 4 | Derek Galvin | Listowel Emmets | 0-15 | 15 | 4 | 3.75 |
| 5 | Colm Cooper | Dr. Crokes | 1-11 | 14 | 2 | 7.00 |
| 5 | Ross O'Donovan | East Kerry | 0-14 | 14 | 3 | 4.66 |
| 7 | Roibeard Mac Gearailt | An Ghaeltacht | 2-07 | 13 | 5 | 2.60 |
| 7 | Maurice Fitzgerald | South Kerry | 1-10 | 13 | 5 | 2.60 |
| 9 | Mike Crowley | Dr. Crokes | 2-06 | 12 | 3 | 4.00 |
| 9 | D. J. Fleming | Kilcummin | 1-09 | 12 | 3 | 4.00 |

In a single game

| Rank | Player | Club | Tally | Total | Opposition |
|---|---|---|---|---|---|
| 1 | Kieran Foley | Mid Kerry | 1-07 | 10 | Kerins O'Rahilly's |
| 2 | Michael O'Grady | Dr. Crokes | 2-03 | 9 | Listowel Emmets |
| 3 | Mike Crowley | Dr. Crokes | 2-02 | 8 | Laune Rangers |
| 3 | Colm Cooper | Dr. Crokes | 1-05 | 8 | Listowel Emmets |
| 3 | Darren Aherne | Austin Stacks | 0-08 | 8 | John Mitchels |
| 3 | Dara Ó Cinnéide | An Ghaeltacht | 0-08 | 8 | East Kerry |
| 7 | Roibeard Mac Gearailt | An Ghaeltacht | 1-04 | 7 | Glenflesk |
| 7 | John O'Connor | Kerins O'Rahilly's | 1-04 | 7 | Listowel Emmets |
| 7 | Mike Frank Russell | Laune Rangers | 0-07 | 7 | Dr. Crokes |
| 7 | Paud O'Donoghue | Glenflesk | 0-07 | 7 | Listowel Emmets |
| 7 | Ross O'Donovan | East Kerry | 0-07 | 7 | Feale Rangers |
| 7 | Mike Frank Russell | Laune Rangers | 0-07 | 7 | An Ghaeltacht |

=== Miscellaneous ===
- Laune Rangers qualified for the final for the first time since 1997.
- The final went to a replay for the first time since 1997.
- Listowel Emmets made their first appearance in the senior championship since 1984.
