= 2006 Kerry Senior Football Championship =

Gaelic football competition

- Dates: 6 May - 12 November 2006
- Teams: 20
- Sponsor: Allied Irish Bank
- Champions: South Kerry (8th title); Paul O'Connor (captain); James O'Sullivan (manager)
- Runners-up: Dr. Crokes; James Fleming (captain); Pat O'Shea (manager)
- Relegated: John Mitchels

Tournament statistics
- Matches played: 33
- Goals scored: 53 (1.61 per match)
- Points scored: 638 (19.33 per match)
- Top scorer(s): Declan Quill (1-28)

The 2006 Kerry Senior Football Championship was the 106th staging of the Kerry Senior Football Championship since its establishment by the Kerry County Board in 1889. The championship ran from 6 May to 12 November 2006.

South Kerry entered the championship as the defending champions in search of a third successive title.

The final was played on 12 November 2006 at FitzGerald Stadium in Killarney, between South Kerry and Dr. Crokes in what was their second meeting in the final. South Kerry won the match by 0–12 to 1–08 to claim their eighth championship title overall and a third title in succession.

Declan Quill was he championship's top scorer with 1-28.

== Team changes ==
=== To Championship ===
Promoted from the Kerry Intermediate Football Championship

- Killarney Legion

=== From Championship ===
Relegated to the Kerry Intermediate Football Championship

- Listowel Emmets

== Results ==
=== Round 1 ===
| 6 May 2006 Round 1 | Rathmore | 0-09 - 0-06 | Milltown/Castlemaine | Rathbeg Grounds |
| | D Casey 0-4, M O'Riordan 0-2, J Buckley 0-2, D O'Sullivan 0-1. | | D Twiss 0-2, C Kerins 0-2, S Murphy 0-1, M Burke 0-1. |

| 6 May 2006 Round 1 | John Mitchels | 0-14 - 0-14 | Kerins O'Rahilly's | Austin Stack Park |
| | GD Dennehy 0-9, J Fitzgerald 0-1, R O'Sullivan 0-1, F O'Connor 0-1, A Moynihan 0-1, S O'Mahony 0-1. | | D Quill 0-10, T Walsh 0-3, T O'Sullivan 0-1. |

| 7 May 2006 Round 1 | St. Kieran's | 0-11 - 0-06 | East Kerry | Currow Grounds |
| | J Buckley 0-3, T McGoldrick 0-3, D Buckley 0-2, M Horgan 0-1, E O'Donoghue 0-1, K Brennan 0-1. | | N O'Mahony 0-2, S Donnelly 0-2, R O'Donovan 0-1, M O'Donoghue 0-1. |

| 7 May 2006 Round 1 | Feale Rangers | 1-09 - 4-04 | St. Brendan's | Frank Sheehy Park |
| | E Galvin 1-1, C Galvin 0-4, E Bowler 0-2, P Galvin 0-1, E Fitzmaurice 0-1. | | C Daly 3-2, J Egan 1-0, J Costello 0-1, S Griffin 0-1. |

| 7 May 2006 Round 1 | Kenmare | 2-15 - 0-14 | West Kerry | Paddy Kennedy Memorial Park |
| | P O'Connor 1-6, J Healy 1-1, A O'Sullivan 0-3, D O'Connor 0-3, M McNally 0-2. | | D O'Sullivan 0-3, G Farrell 0-3, A McNamara 0-2, B Dorgan 0-2, B O'Driscoll 0-2, N Sheehy 0-1, B Hannafin 0-1. |

| 7 May 2006 Round 1 | Mid Kerry | 0-10 - 0-07 | Shannon Rangers | Frank Sheehy Park |
| | D O'Sullivan 0-6, R O'Connor 0-2, M Hallissey 0-1, A O'Shea 0-1. | | G Dowling 0-3, T O'Rourke 0-2, A Lanigan 0-1, P Kelly 0-1. |

| 7 May 2006 Round 1 | Dingle | 0-18 - 0-09 | Kilcummin | Páirc an Aghasigh |
| | D Devane 0-5, A O'Neill 0-3, C Murphy 0-2, M Evans 0-2, J Flannery 0-2, L Óg Higgins 0-1, T Griffin 0-1, T Garvey 0-1, D Geaney 0-1. | | DJ Fleming 0-7, J Devane 0-1, D O'Dwyer 0-1. |

| 13 May 2006 Round 1 replay | John Mitchels | 0-06 - 1-13 | Kerins O'Rahilly's | Austin Stack Park |
| | GD Dennehy 0-3, A Moynihan 0-1, B Costello 0-1, E Kelliher 0-1. | | T Walsh 1-2, D Quill 0-4, D Moran 0-3, B Moran 0-2, M Fitzgerald 0-1, R Molloy 0-1. |

| 14 May 2006 Round 1 | Laune Rangers | 2-09 - 2-11 | Austin Stacks | Austin Stack Park |
| | MF Russell 0-5, J Sheehan 1-0, P O'Sullivan 1-0, L Hassett 0-1, T McGillicuddy 0-1. | | G O'Connell 0-5, M Collins 0-4, D Sayers 1-0, W Quillinan 1-0, C O'Connor 0-2, W Kirby 0-1, D Long 0-1. |

=== Round 2 ===
| 26 May 2006 Round 2 | East Kerry | 1-19 - 1-02 | Shannon Rangers | FitzGerald Stadium |
| | S Dennehy 1-2, D O'Connor 0-4, M O'Donoghue 0-4, R Donovan 0-4, M Murphy 0-3, F McAuliffe 0-1, D O'Sullivan 0-1. | | I Blake 1-2. |

| 27 May 2006 Round 2 | Kilcummin | 0-09 - 0-09 | Laune Rangers | Kilcummin Grounds |
| | DJ Fleming 0-4, D Dwyer 0-2, K Gorman 0-1, K O'Donoghue 0-1, M O'Connor 0-1. | | P O'Sullivan 0-5, MF Russell 0-2, B O'Shea 0-1, C Kelly 0-1. |

| 27 May 2006 Round 2 | Feale Rangers | 1-11 - 0-12 | West Kerry | Paddy Kennedy Memorial Park |
| | E Bowler 0-7, B O'Connell 1-0, Galvin 0-2, P Somers 0-1, E Fitzmaurice 0-1. | | G Farrell 0-6, B O'Driscoll 0-3, J Dorgan 0-1, B Hannifin 0-1, D O'Sullivan 0-1. |

| 28 May 2006 Round 2 | Milltown/Castlemaine | 0-07 - 0-07 | John Mitchels | Páirc de Búrca |
| | D Twiss 0-3, S Murphy 0-2, I Twiss 0-1, O Boyle 0-1. | | A Moynihan 0-2, J Cronin 0-2, C O'Callaghan 0-1, S McMahon 0-1, E Kelliher 0-1. |

| 9 June 2006 Round 2 replay | John Mitchels | 1-06 - 0-10 | Milltown/Castlemaine | Austin Stack Park |
| | J Fitzgerald 0-4, R O'Sullivan 1-0, S O'Mahony 0-2. | | O Boyle 0-3, D Kelliher 0-3, S Murphy 0-2, M Quirke 0-1, D Twiss 0-1. |

| 17 June 2006 Round 2 replay | Kilcummin | 0-07 - 0-11 | Laune Rangers | Kilcummin Grounds |
| | DJ Fleming 0-4, K Gorman 0-1, J Devane 0-1, E O'Donoghue 0-1. | | P O'Sullivan 0-4, MF Russell 0-3, L Hassett 0-2, C Kelly 0-1, G Mahony 0-1. |

=== Relegation playoff ===
| 8 October 2006 Playoff | Kilcummin | 0-14 - 1-07 | John Mitchels | Páirc de Búrca |
| | DJ Fleming 0-5, B Brosnan 0-2, M O'Connor 0-2, J Devane 0-2, E O'Donoghue 0-1, K Gorman 0-1, J Herlihy 0-1. | | J Fitzgerald 0-5, D Flahive 1-0, A O'Mahony 0-1, E Kelliher 0-1. |

=== Round 3 ===
| 15 June 2006 Round 3 | Kerins O'Rahilly's | 0-10 - 0-09 | Rathmore | Austin Stack Park |
| | D Quill 0-4, P Madden 0-2, D Moran 0-1, M O'Shea 0-1, M Quirke 0-1, T Walsh 0-1. | | M O'Riordan 0-4, Damien Casey 0-3, S Lehane 0-1, K O'Sullivan 0-1. |

| 16 June 2006 Round 3 | St. Brendan's | 3-11 - 1-08 | Austin Stacks | Kilmoyley Grounds |
| | C Daly 0-7, S Wallace 1-2, B Griffin 1-1, J Egan 1-0, E Ferris 0-1. | | D Long 1-3, M Collins 0-2, M Courtney 0-2, W Kirby 0-1. |

| 17 June 2006 Round 3 | St. Kieran's | 0-12 - 2-07 | Mid Kerry | Castleisland Grounds |
| | T O'Connor 0-6, J Buckley 0-3, J Dennehy 0-2, M O'Connell 0-1. | | D Walsh 1-0, T O'Sullivan 1-0, D O'Sullivan 0-3, K Foley 0-2, K O'Brien 0-1, A O'Shea 0-1. |

| 17 June 2006 Round 3 | Dingle | 0-10 - 0-10 | An Ghaeltacht | Páirc an Aghasaigh |
| | D Devane 0-5, D Ryan 0-2, D Geaney 0-1, S O'Dowd 0-1, B Kelliher 0-1. | | R Mac Gearailt 0-3, D Ó Cinnéide 0-2, T Ó Sé 0-1, R Ó Flatharta 0-1, M Ó Conchúir 0-1, D Ó Sé 0-1, D Ó Flathart 0-1. |

| 18 June 2006 Round 3 | Dr. Crokes | 4-14 - 1-06 | Kenmare | FitzGerald Stadium |
| | A Kennelly 3-1, C Cooper 0-4, J Payne 1-0, J Fleming 0-3, E Brosnan 0-2, K O'Leary 0-1, B Looney 0-1, E O'Sullivan 0-1, N Murphy 0-1. | | S Healy 1-1, F O'Sullivan 0-2, S Cremin 0-1, P O'Connor 0-1, L Shea 0-1. |

| 18 June 2006 Round 3 | Killarney Legion | 1-11 - 0-14 | Milltown/Castlemaine | FitzGerald Stadium |
| | D Murphy 0-6, M O'Sullivan 1-2, J Cronin 0-1, S Hegarty 0-1, J Bowler 0-1. | | D Twiss 0-6, D Kelliher 0-3, O Boyle 0-2, C Kerins 0-2, M Burke 0-1. |

| 18 June 2006 Round 3 | South Kerry | 2-13 - 0-06 | Feale Rangers | Moyvane Grounds |
| | B Sheehan 1-4, K Young 1-0, J Sugrue 0-2, R Hussey 0-2, R O'Connor 0-2, B Hickey 0-1, Declan O'Sullivan 0-1, D O'Dwyer 0-1. | | P Galvin 0-3, C Galvin 0-2, E Fitzmaurice 0-1. |

| 15 July 2006 Round 3 replay | Milltown/Castlemaine | 1-09 - 0-11 (aet) | Killarney Legion | Páirc de Búrca |
| | D Twiss 0-5, S Murphy 1-0, D Kelliher 0-2, O Boyle 0-1, M Burke 0-1. | | M O'Sullivan 0-6, E Murphy 0-1, J Cronin 0-1, S Hegarty 0-1, K O'Neill 0-1, S Culloty 0-1. |

| 24 September 2006 Round 3 | East Kerry | 0-10 - 0-09 | Laune Rangers | FitzGerald Stadium |
| | D O'Sullivan 0-2, L Murphy 0-2, N O'Mahony 0-2, L Daly 0-2, D O'Connor 0-1, DJ O'Connor 0-1. | | P O'Sullivan 0-6, C Kelly 0-1, L Hassett 0-1, MF Russell 0-1. |

| 24 September 2006 Round 3 replay | An Ghaeltacht | 0-14 - 1-09 | Dingle | Gallarus Grounds |
| | D Ó Cinnéide 0-4, A Mac Gearailt 0-3, C Ó Dubhda 0-3, T Ó Conchúir 0-1, C Ó Cruadhlaoich 0-1, R Ó Flatharta 0-1, SM Ó Conchúir 0-1. | | D Geaney 1-1, A O'Neill 0-2, JB Brosnan 0-1, J Flannery 0-1, M Evans 0-1, F Smyth 0-1, D Devane 0-1, T Garvey 0-1. |

=== Quarter-finals ===
| 1 October 2006 Quarter-final | Dr. Crokes | 2-10 - 2-06 | Milltown/Castlemaine | Austin Stack Park |
| | E Brosnan 1-1, K O'Leary 1-1, C Cooper 0-3, B Looney 0-3, A Kennelly 0-1, J Fleming 0-1. | | F Kelliher 2-0, D Twiss 0-2, I Twiss 0-2, D Kelliher 0-1, C Kelliher 0-1. |

| 1 October 2006 Quarter-final | Mid Kerry | 3-07 - 2-08 | An Ghaeltacht | Austin Stack Park |
| | K Foley 1-3, Darran O'Sullivan 1-0, A Cahillane 1-0, J Nagle 0-1, L Sheehan 0-1, P McCarthy 0-1, S O'Sullivan 0-1. | | D Ó Sé 1-1, A Mac Gearailt 1-1, D Ó Cinnéide 0-2, E Mac Gearailt 0-1, C Ó Dubhda 0-1, SM Ó Conchúir 0-1, C Mac Gearailt 0-1. |

| 7 October 2006 Quarter-final | South Kerry | 1-09 - 0-08 | East Kerry | J. P. O'Sullivan Park |
| | B Sheehan 0-5, R Hussey 1-1, P Curran 0-2, M Fitzgerald 0-1. | | L Murphy 0-4, M Murphy 0-2, F McAuliffe 0-1, |

| 8 October 2006 Quarter-final | Kerins O'Rahilly's | 1-12 - 2-05 | St. Brendan's | Austin Stack Park |
| | D Quill 1-7, D Moran 0-4, T Walsh 0-1. | | C Daly 1-1, S Griffin 1-0, S Wallace 0-3, D O'Callaghan 0-1. |

=== Semi-finals ===
| 21 October 2006 Semi-final | South Kerry | 0-11 - 0-08 | Kerins O'Rahilly's | FitzGerald Stadium |
| | R Hussey 0-4, M Fitzgerald 0-2, Declan O'Sullivan 0-2, B Hickey 0-1, B Sheehan 0-1, J Shanahan 0-1. | | D Quill 0-3, T Walsh 0-2, J O'Connor 0-1, P Madden 0-1, G Molloy 0-1. |

| 22 October 2006 Semi-final | Dr. Crokes | 3-08 - 1-09 | Mid Kerry | Austin Stack Park |
| | C Cooper 2-3, E Brosnan 1-0, J Fleming 0-2, S Doolan 0-1, A O'Donovan 0-1, K Brosnan 0-1. | | S O'Sullivan 1-3, Darran O'Sullivan 0-2, K Foley 0-2, A O'Shea 0-1, A O'Connor 0-1. |

=== Final ===
| 12 November 2006 Final | South Kerry | 0-12 - 1-06 | Dr. Crokes | FitzGerald Stadium |
| | B Sheehan 0-4 (fs); R O'Connor 0-3, R Hussey 0-2 each; A O'Sullivan, Declan O'Sullivan and D O'Dwyer 0-1 each. | | K O'Leary 1-1, J Fleming 0-4 frees, B Looney, E Kavanagh and C Cooper 0-1 each | Referee: P Lyons (Laune Rangers) |

== Championship statistics ==
=== Top scorers ===
Overall

| Rank | Player | Club | Tally | Total | Matches | Average |
|---|---|---|---|---|---|---|
| 1 | Declan Quill | Kerins O'Rahilly's | 1-28 | 31 | 5 | 6.20 |
| 2 | Conor Daly | St. Brendan's | 4-10 | 22 | 3 | 7.33 |
| 3 | D. J. Fleming | Kilcummin | 0-20 | 20 | 4 | 5.00 |
| 4 | Derek Twiss | Milltown/Castlemaine | 0-19 | 19 | 6 | 3.16 |
| 5 | Colm Cooper | Dr. Crokes | 2-11 | 17 | 4 | 4.25 |
| 5 | Bryan Sheehan | South Kerry | 1-14 | 17 | 4 | 4.25 |
| 7 | Darran O'Sullivan | Mid Kerry | 1-11 | 14 | 4 | 4.25 |
| 8 | Ronan Hussey | South Kerry | 1-09 | 12 | 4 | 3.00 |
| 8 | Tommy Walsh | South Kerry | 1-09 | 12 | 5 | 2.40 |
| 8 | Ger Dan Dennehy | John Mitchels | 0-12 | 12 | 4 | 3.00 |

In a single game

| Rank | Player | Club | Tally | Total | Opposition |
|---|---|---|---|---|---|
| 1 | Conor Daly | St. Brendan's | 3-02 | 11 | Feale Rangers |
| 2 | Andrew Kennelly | Dr. Crokes | 3-01 | 10 | Kenmare |
| 2 | Declan Quill | Kerins O'Rahilly's | 1-07 | 10 | St. Brendan's |
| 2 | Declan Quill | Kerins O'Rahilly's | 0-10 | 10 | John Mitchels |
| 5 | Colm Cooper | Dr. Crokes | 2-03 | 9 | Mid Kerry |
| 5 | Paul O'Connor | Kenmare | 1-06 | 9 | West Kerry |
| 5 | Ger Dan Dennehy | John Mitchels | 0-09 | 9 | Kerins O'Rahilly's |
| 8 | Bryan Sheehan | South Kerry | 1-04 | 7 | Feale Rangers |
| 8 | D. J. Fleming | Kilcummin | 0-07 | 7 | Dingle |
| 8 | Eddie Bowler | Feale Rangers | 0-07 | 7 | West Kerry |
| 8 | Conor Daly | St. Brendan's | 0-07 | 7 | Austin Stacks |

=== Miscellaneous ===
- South Kerry win three in a row for the first time in their history and are the first since East Kerry between 1997 and 1999.
- Dr Crokes play in the Munster Senior Club Football Championship.
- The first round match between Laune Rangers and Austin Stacks was abandoned by the referee at half-time due to floodlight failure at Austin Stack Park.
