= 2001 Kerry Senior Football Championship =

Gaelic football competition

- Dates: 1 June - 28 October 2001
- Teams: 20
- Sponsor: Allied Irish Bank
- Champions: An Ghaeltacht (1st title); Micí Ó Conchúir (captain); Séamus Mac Gearailt (manager)
- Runners-up: Austin Stacks; Pa Laide (captain); Brian Neenan (manager)

Tournament statistics
- Matches played: 20
- Goals scored: 36 (1.8 per match)
- Points scored: 431 (21.55 per match)
- Top scorer(s): Aodán Mac Gearailt (2-20)

The 2001 Kerry Senior Football Championship was the 101st staging of the Kerry Senior Football Championship since its establishment by the Kerry County Board in 1889. The draw for the opening round fixtures took place on 3 April 2001. The championship ran from 1 June to 28 October 2001. It was the last championship to be played using a straight knockout format until 2020..

Dr. Crokes entered the championship as the defending champions, however, they were beaten by Austin Stacks in the semi-finals.

The final was played on 28 October 2001 at FitzGerald Stadium in Killarney, between An Ghaeltacht and Austin Stacks, in what was their first ever meeting in the final. An Ghaeltacht won the match by 1-13 to 0-10 to claim their first ever championship title.

An Ghaeltacht's Aodán Mac Gearailt was the championship's top scorer with 2-20.

== Results ==
=== Preliminary round ===
1 June 2001 Preliminary round	Kerins O'Rahilly's	1-15 - 0-04	Killarney Legion	Austin Stack Park
	D Quill 0-6, S Wallace 1-0, M Fitzgerald 0-3, John O'Connor 0-2, C Magnier 0-2, P O'Connor 0-1, B O'Shea 0-1.		A O'Neill 0-2, S Culloty 0-2.

1 June 2001 Preliminary round	St. Brendan's	2-06 - 3-11	Feale Rangers	Austin Stack Park
	S Murphy 1-3, T Geaney 1-0, D Mullins 0-1, D Clifford 0-1, L Lyons 0-1.		E Bowler 1-2, E Fitzmaurice 1-2, N Kennelly 0-5, T Dillon 1-0, D Galvin 0-1, M Kearney 0-1.

2 June 2001 Preliminary round	Shannon Rangers	2-07 - 2-12	Mid Kerry	FitzGerald Stadium
	J Moroney 1-1, JP Leahy 1-0, L Weir 0-2, P Kelly 0-1, P O'Donoghue 0-1, B Bambury 0-1, P O'Hanlon 0-1.		I Twiss 1-2, K Foley 0-4, S O'Sullivan 1-0, I O'Shea 0-2, J Daly 0-1, J Giles 0-1, G McGrath 0-1, G Wrenn 0-1.

2 June 2001 Preliminary round	East Kerry	0-09 - 1-10	Castleisland Desmonds	FitzGerald Stadium
	R O'Donovan 0-3, S Flynn 0-2, F McAuliffe 0-2, B Gleeson 0-1, S Óg O'Leary 0-1.		D Buckley 1-0, J Brennan 0-3, M Horgan 0-2, D Walsh 0-2, K Lynch 0-2, B McMahon 0-1.

=== Round 1 ===
22 June 2001 Round 1	Rathmore	0-08 - 0-15	Feale Rangers	FitzGerald Stadium
	J Murphy 0-3, K O'Keeffe 0-2, P McCarthy 0-1, MD Cahill 0-1, M O'Riordan 0-1.		B Scanlon 0-4, C Galvin 0-3, D Galvin 0-2, E Breen 0-2, N Kennelly 0-2, M Kearney 0-1, P Galvin 0-1.

23 June 2001 Round 1	Castleisland Desmonds	1-11 - 1-07	Kilcummin	FitzGerald Stadium
	D Buckley 1-0, J Brennan 0-3, K Lynch 0-2, M Lyons 0-2, M Broderick 0-1, D Walsh 0-1, B McMahon 0-1, M Horgan 0-1.		J Dwyer 1-0, D O'Dwyer 0-2, S O'Leary 0-1, DJ Fleming 0-1, E O'Donoghue 0-1, P McCarthy 0-1, SB Doherty 0-1.

23 June 2001 Round 1	Dr. Crokes	3-12 - 1-12	St. Kieran's	FitzGerald Stadium
	R Neher 1-3, M Cooper 1-1, P O'Brien 1-0, E Brosnan 0-2, C Cooper 0-2, J Fleming 0-1, A O'Shea 0-1, B Clarke 0-1, M Crowley 0-1.		P Galvin 1-2, L Brosnan 0-3, S McElligott 0-2, J McGlynn 0-2, R O'Rahilly 0-2, EJ O'Donoghue 0-1.

29 June 2001 Round 1	Mid Kerry	1-11 - 1-15	Glenflesk	Páirc de Burca
	K Foley 1-3, I Twiss 0-2, I O'Shea 0-2, S O'Sullivan 0-2, W Harmon 0-1.		P O'Donoghue 0-11, J Crowley 1-3, E O'Donoghue 0-1.

29 June 2001 Round 1	Austin Stacks	1-10 - 0-06	West Kerry	Austin Stack Park
	B Sheehan 1-0, F Smith 0-3, D Long 0-3, M Collins 0-1, D McEvoy 0-1, G Clifford 0-1, P Laide 0-1.		J Ferriter 0-2, A O'Connor 0-2, B Dorgan 0-1, N Sheehy 0-1.

30 June 2001 Round 1	John Mitchels	0-07 - 1-17	South Kerry	Austin Stack Park
	F O'Brien 0-5, D Dennehy 0-2.		M Fitzgerald 0-7, J Shanahan 1-0, P Curran 0-3, J Quirke 0-2, D Dwyer 0-2, J Clifford 0-2, R O'Connor 0-1.

30 June 2001 Round 1	Kenmare	0-08 - 2-13	An Ghaeltacht	Fr. Breen Park
	J O'Neill 0-6, F O'Sullivan 0-1, S O'Shea 0-1.		A Mac Gearailt 1-6, R Mac Gearailt 1-3, M Ó Sé 0-1, T Ó Muircheartaigh 0-1, C Ó Dubhda 0-1, T Ó Conchúir 0-1.

1 July 2001 Round 1	Kerins O'Rahilly's	1-08 - 0-11	Laune Rangers	Austin Stack Park
	D Quill 1-5, G O'Brien 0-2, R Houlihan 0-1.		B O'Shea 0-3, J Lynch 0-2, E Russell 0-2, B O'Sullivan 0-1, P O'Sullivan 0-1, J Sheehan 0-1, C O'Connor 0-1.

20 July 2001 Round 1 replay	Laune Rangers	2-04 - 0-14	Kerins O'Rahilly's	J. P. O'Sullivan Park
	MF Russell 1-4, C O'Connor 1-0.		D Quill 0-5, M Fitzgerald 0-4, S Wallace 0-2, G O'Brien 0-1, J O'Connor 0-1, D Diggins 0-1.

=== Quarter-finals ===
18 August 2001 Quarter-final	An Ghaeltacht	0-12 - 1-08	Glenflesk	Austin Stack Park
	A Mac Gearailt 0-7, D Ó Sé 0-3, T Ó Muircheartaigh 0-2.		P O'Donoghue 1-6, S Moynihan 0-1, D McCarthy 0-1.

19 August 2001 Quarter-final	Austin Stacks	1-15 - 2-10	Feale Rangers	Austin Stack Park
	D Long 0-5, JP O'Neill 1-0, B Sheehan 0-2, P Laide 0-2, J Walsh 0-2, M Collins 0-2, F Smith 0-1, D McEvoy 0-1.		E Fitzmaurice 1-0, E Galvin 1-0, D Galvin 0-3, N Kennelly 0-3, P Galvin 0-1, B Scanlon 0-1, E Bowler 0-1.

19 August 2001 Quarter-final	Kerins O'Rahilly's	1-10 - 2-07	South Kerry	Austin Stack Park
	M Fitzgerald 1-2, F Quill 0-5, G Walsh 0-1, J O'Connor 0-1, A Daly 0-1.		M Fitzgerald 1-2, D O'Dwyer 1-1, B Hickey 0-2, P Curran 0-1, J Clifford 0-1.

5 September 2001 Quarter-final	Dr. Crokes	0-14 - 0-07	Castleisland Desmonds	Austin Stack Park
	R Neher 0-9, C Cooper 0-2, E Brosnan 0-2, J Fleming 0-1.		K Lynch 0-7.

7 September 2001 Quarter-final replay	Kerins O'Rahilly's	0-10 - 1-08	South Kerry	J. P. O'Sullivan
	D Quill 0-4, G O'Brien 0-2, M Fitzgerald 0-1, M Quirke 0-1, D Diggins 0-1, J O'Connor 0-1.		R O'Connor 0-4, J Clifford 1-0, D O'Dwyer 0-3, J Quirke 0-1.

=== Semi-finals ===
29 September 2001 Semi-final	An Ghaeltacht	0-15 - 0-09	South Kerry	FitzGerald Stadium
	A Mac Gearailt 0-5, D Ó Cinnéide 0-4, C Ó Cruadhlaoich 0-3, T Ó Sé 0-1, M Ó Sé 0-1, C Ó Dubhda 0-1.		M Fitzgerald 0-5, H Courtney 0-1, N O'Driscoll 0-1, J Quirke 0-1, D Dwyer 0-1.

7 October 2001 Semi-final	Austin Stacks	0-12 - 1-08	Dr. Crokes	Austin Stack Park
	M Collins 0-5, C Kennedy 0-2, D McEvoy 0-2, D Long 0-2, B Sheehan 0-1.		R Neher 0-6, P O'Brien 1-0, B Clarke 0-1, C Cooper 0-1.

=== Final ===
28 October 2001 Final	An Ghaeltacht	1-13 - 0-10	Austin Stacks	FitzGerald Stadium
	A MacGearailt 1-2, D O Cinneide 0-5 (4fs) R MacGearailt 0-2. T O Se, D O Se, JJ Corduibh and C O Dughda 0-1 each.		D Long 0-6 (5fs), B Sheehan, M Collins, C Kennedy and F Smith 0-1 each.	Referee: M O'Donoghue (Glenflesk)

== Championship statistics ==
=== Top scorers ===
Overall

Rank	Player	Club	Tally	Total	Matches	Average
1	Aodán Mac Gearailt	An Ghaeltacht	2-20	26	4	6.50
2	Declan Quill	Kerins O'Rahilly's	1-20	23	4	5.75
3	Roland Neher	Dr. Crokes	1-18	21	3	7.00
4	Paud O'Donoghue	Glenflesk	1-17	20	3	6.66
5	Dara Long	Austin Stacks	0-16	16	4	4.00
6	Mark Fitzgerald	Kerins O'Rahilly's	1-10	13	5	2.60
7	Maurice Fitzgerald	South Kerry	1-09	12	3	4.00
8	Kevin Lynch	Castleisland Desmonds	0-11	11	3	3.66
9	Kieran Foley	Mid Kerry	1-07	10	2	5.00
9	Noel Kennelly	Feale Rangers	0-10	10	3	3.33

In a single game

Rank	Player	Club	Tally	Total	Opposition
1	Paud O'Donoghue	Glenflesk	0-11	11	Mid Kerry
2	Aodán Mac Gearailt	An Ghaeltacht	1-06	9	An Ghaeltacht
2	Paud O'Donoghue	Glenflesk	1-06	9	An Ghaeltacht
2	Roland Neher	Dr. Crokes	0-09	9	Casteisland Desmonds
5	Declan Quill	Kerins O'Rahilly's	1-05	8	Laune Rangers
6	Mike Frank Russell	Laune Rangers	1-04	7	Kerins O'Rahilly's
6	Maurice Fitzgerald	South Kerry	0-07	7	John Mitchels
6	Aodán Mac Gearailt	An Ghaeltacht	0-07	7	Glenflesk
6	Kevin Lynch	Castleisland Desmonds	0-07	7	Dr. Crokes
10	Séamus Murphy	St. Brendan's	1-03	6	Feale Rangers
10	Roland Neher	Dr. Crokes	1-03	6	St. Kieran's
10	Kieran Foley	Mid Kerry	1-03	6	Glenflesk
10	John Crowley	Glenflesk	1-03	6	Mid Kerry
10	Roibeard Mac Gearailt	An Ghaeltacht	1-03	6	Kenmare
10	Declan Quill	Kerins O'Rahilly's	0-06	6	Killarney Legion
10	James O'Neill	Kenmare	0-06	6	An Ghaeltacht
10	Roland Neher	Dr. Crokes	0-06	6	Austin Stacks
10	Dara Long	Austin Stacks	0-06	6	An Ghaeltacht

=== Miscellaneous ===
- An Ghaeltacht won the title for the very first time in their history. They became the first rural club to do so since Ballymacelligott in 1918.
- Austin Stacks qualified for the final for the first time since 1994.
- Glenflesk make their first appearance at senior level.
