= 1900 Kerry Senior Football Championship =

Gaelic football competition

- Teams: 21
- Champions: Laune Rangers (5th title); John P. Murphy (captain)
- Runners-up: Dr. Crokes; Con O'Sullivan (captain)

The 1900 Kerry Senior Football Championship was the 10th staging of the Kerry Senior Football Championship since its establishment by the Kerry County Board in 1889. It was the first championship to be completed since 1897.

Tralee Mitchels entered the championship as the defending champions, however, they conceded a walkover by in the first round.

The final was played on 2 December 1900 at Tralee Sportsfield, between Laune Rangers and Dr. Crokes, in what was their second meeting overall in the final and a first in 11 years. Laune Rangers won the match by 3–04 to 0–03 to claim their fifth championship title overall and a first title in 8 years.

== Teams ==
21 teams competed for the Co. Senior Football Championship, Knockanure, Newtownsandes, Killarney, Ballymacelligott, Listowel, Tralee, Cahersiveen, Valentia, Kruger's Own (Tralee), O Brennan, Clohane, Laune Rangers, Currans, Keel, Irish Brigade (Killorglin), Milltown, Cordal, Caherdaniel, Castleisland, Firies and Currow.

== Results ==
=== Final ===
| 2 December 1900 Final | Laune Rangers | 3-04 - 0-03 | Dr. Crokes | Tralee Sportsfield |
