= Cromane =

Cromane An Cromán
- Village
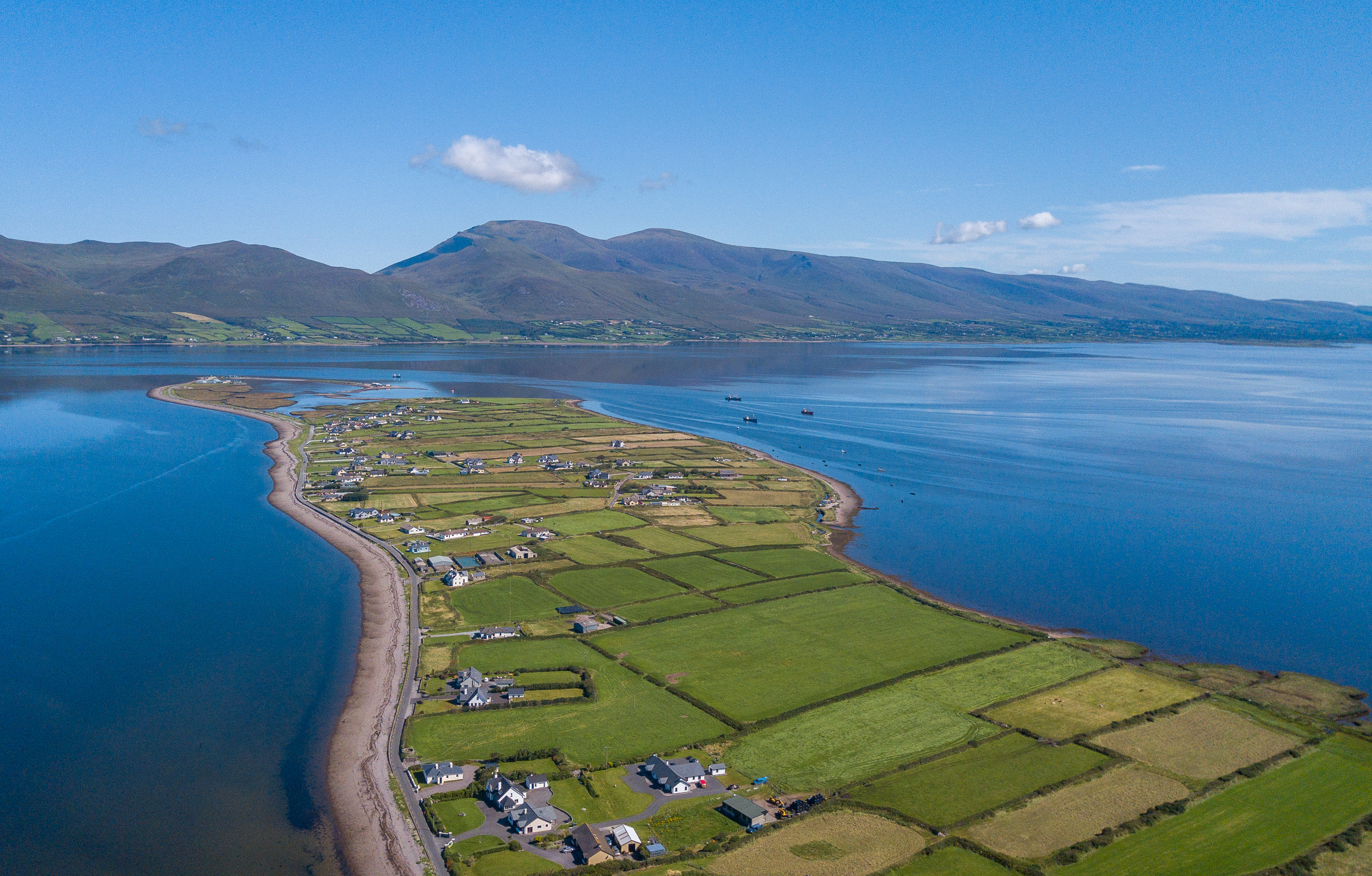
- Aerial view of Cromane

- Location in Ireland
- Coordinates: 52°6′22″N 9°53′49″W
- Country: Ireland
- Province: Munster
- County: County Kerry

Population (2022)
  - Total: 206
- Time zone: UTC+0 (WET)
  - Summer (DST): UTC-1 (IST (WEST))

Cromane (Irish: An Cromán) is a village located in County Kerry, Ireland. The village's Irish name, An Cromán meaning "hip bone", derives from the shape of the peninsula, which resembles a hip when seen on a map. Cromane is 9 km (6 mi) west of Killorglin town and a similar distance to Glenbeigh when travelling south-west. As of the 2022 census, the village of Cromane had a population of 206 people, up from 116 as of the 2016 census.

== Location ==
Cromane is located in the centre of County Kerry with views of the Dingle Peninsula to the north and the Iveragh Peninsula westwards.

Cromane is one of the few locations in the county where there is a 360-degree view of the Brandon Mountain Range, the Sliabh Mis Mountains and MacGillycuddy's Reeks, home to Ireland's highest mountain Corrán Tuathail.

== History ==
Evidence of ancient settlement in the area includes a number of midden, ringfort and standing stone sites in the townlands of Cromane Upper and Cromane Lower.

Lios na Gaoithe, meaning "fort of the wind", is a placename preserved in local folklore near Cromane and is associated with an ancient ringfort and a reported standing stone. The Irish Folklore Commission's "School's Collection" records a number of stories associated with the ringfort.

In the early 19th century, a 10-tonne piece of Spanish marble, which was destined for use in the nearby church in Killorglin, fell into the waters a short distance from Cromane strand. The marble slab has been "a local landmark since 1840".

== Economy ==
While Cromane was traditionally a salmon fishing village, since the mid-20th century, the area has become a centre for aquaculture. Ireland's largest natural mussel beds are located in nearby Castlemaine Harbour, and mussel cultivation is undertaken in the area. Cromane has also become a base for growing oysters.

Jack's Coastguard Restaurant is located in Cromane's former Coastguard Station. The building, which overlooks Castlemaine Harbour, was built in 1866 and was turned into a public house in 1961.

== Sport ==
=== Gaelic football ===
Cromane GAA club, known as Réalt na Mara (a name shared by the village's church and primary school), has won a number of Kerry Novice Gaelic football titles. Two Cromane GAA players, Donnchadh Walsh and Sean O'Sullivan, have won senior All-Ireland Championship medals with Kerry.

The Ladies' Gaelic football in Cromane, Cromane Ladies GFC, won the 2025 Munster Junior Ladies Football Club Championship title, and went on to reach the 2025 All-Ireland Junior club final (losing by one point to of Kilkenny).

=== Rowing ===
Cromane has a rowing club, in operation since 1956, that is part of the Kerry Coastal Rowing Association and the Irish Coastal Rowing Federation. Among the races in which the club competes is the traditional Seine boat race. This race featuring crews of 12 oarsmen (two men to an oar) with a cox guiding them. The history of the Seine boat was one of fishing, specifically for mackerel, and fishermen used a seine-net. Seine boat racing is unique to South Kerry and the Cromane crew traditionally competes against teams from other villages in the surrounding area. Each summer, Cromane hosts an annual regatta that features races for all ages from under-12s up to the adult Seine boat competition.

== Notable people ==
- John McCarthy, American computer scientist and cognitive scientist. His father came from Cromane.
- Sean O'Sullivan, won four All-Ireland medals with the Kerry senior football team.
- Donnchadh Walsh, won three All-Ireland medals with the Kerry senior football team.
