= 1901 Kerry Senior Football Championship =

Gaelic football competition

- Teams: 18
- Champions: Dr. Crokes (1st title); E. O'Sullivan (captain)
- Runners-up: Cahersiveen

The 1901 Kerry Senior Football Championship was the 11th staging of the Kerry Senior Football Championship since its establishment by the Kerry County Board in 1889.

Laune Rangers entered the championship as the defending champions, however, they were beaten by Dr. Crokes in the second round.

The final was played on 3 August 1902, between Dr. Crokes and Cahersiveen, in what was their first ever meeting in the final. Dr. Crokes won the match by 1–02 to 0–02 to claim their first ever championship title.

== Results ==
=== Final ===
3 August 1902 Final	Dr. Crokes	1-02 - 0-02	Cahersiveen

=== Miscellaneous ===
- Dr. Crokes win their first championship.
