= 1892 Kerry Senior Football Championship =

Gaelic football competition

- Dates: 15
- Teams: April - 25 September 1892
- Champions: Laune Rangers (3rd title)
- Runners-up: Ballymacelligott

The 1892 Kerry Senior Football Championship was the fourth staging of the Kerry Senior Football Championship since its establishment by the Kerry County Board in 1889. The championship ran from April to 25 September 1892.

Ballymacelligott entered the championship as the defending champions.

The final was played on 25 September 1892 at the Athletic Ground in Tralee, between Laune Rangers and Ballymacelligott, in what was their first meeting in the final. Laune Rangers won the match by 3–07 to 1–07 to claim their third championship title overall and a first title in two years.

== Results ==
=== Final ===
25 September 1892 Final	Laune Rangers	3-07 - 1-07	Ballymacelligott	Tralee Athletic Ground
