= 1893 Kerry Senior Football Championship =

Gaelic football competition

- Dates: 8
- Champions: Laune Rangers (4th title)
- Runners-up: Keel Geraldines

The 1893 Kerry Senior Football Championship was the fifth staging of the Kerry Senior Football Championship since its establishment by the Kerry County Board in 1889.

Laune Rangers entered the championship as the defending champions.

The final was played on 6 August 1893 at the Athletic Ground in Tralee, between Laune Rangers and Keel Geraldines, in what was their first ever meeting in the final. Laune Rangers won the match by 1–01 to 0–02 to claim their fourth championship title overall, a second titles in succession and a fourth title in five years.

== Results ==
=== Final ===
| 6 August 1893 Final | Laune Rangers | 1-01 - 0-02 | Keel Geraldines | Tralee Athletic Ground |
