= 1995–96 All-Ireland Senior Club Football Championship =

Irish Football Championship

- Teams: 33
- Sponsor: Allied Irish Bank
- Champions: Laune Rangers (1st title); Gerard Murphy (captain); John Evans (manager)
- Runners-up: Éire Óg; Joe Hayden (captain); Bobby Miller (manager)

The 1995–96 All-Ireland Senior Club Football Championship was the 26th staging of the All-Ireland Senior Club Football Championship since its establishment by the Gaelic Athletic Association in 1970-71.

Kilmacud Crokes were the defending champions, however, they failed to qualify after being beaten in the Dublin County Championship.

On 17 March 1996, Laune Rangers won the championship following a 4-05 to 0-11 defeat of Éire Óg in the All-Ireland final at Croke Park. It was their first ever championship title.

== Munster ==
=== First round ===
22 October 1995 First round	Rathgormack	1-08 - 1-13	Moyle Rovers	Walsh Park
	M Power 0-4, S Power 1-0, J Murray 0-2, R Power 0-1, B Murray 0-1.		Donal Foley 1-3, J Williams 0-4, J Owens 0-4, P Boland 0-1, J Dunne 0-1.

22 October 1995 First round	Bantry Blues	1-10 - 2-08	Laune Rangers	Wolfe Tone Park
	K Harrington 1-4, S McCarthy 0-3, P O'Regan 0-1, D O'Neill 0-1, S Dineen 0-1.		G Murphy 2-4, P Griffin 0-2, J Shannon 0-1, T Fleming 0-1.

=== Semi-finals ===
5 November 1995 Semi-final	Laune Rangers	0-15 - 1-04	Claughaun	J. P. O'Sullivan Park
	P Griffin 0-4, L Hassett 0-4, G Murphy 0-3, P McKenna 0-2, T Fleming 0-1, B O'Shea 0-1.		B Ryan 1-0, P Galligan 0-1, D Fitzgerald 0-1, L O'Connor 0-1, M Galligan 0-1.

5 November 1995 Semi-final	Moyle Rovers	1-09 - 0-08	Doonbeg	Ardfinnan Sportsfield
	Donal Foley 1-2, Derry Foley 0-4, J Dunne 0-1, J Owens 0-1, P Boland 0-1.		F McInerney 0-5, B Griffin 0-1, K Nugent 0-1, B Lynch 0-1.

=== Final ===
19 November 1995 Final	Laune Rangers	3-19 - 2-04	Moyle Rovers	Páirc Uí Rinn
	G Murphy 1-3, L Hassett 1-2, S O'Sullivan 1-1, T Fleming 0-4, P Griffin 0-3, J Shannon 0-2, C Kearney 0-2, B O'Shea 0-1, M Hassett 0-1.		Donal Foley 1-1, Derry Foley 1-0, J Owens 0-2, R Boland 0-1.

== Quarter-final ==
10 December 1995 Quarter-final	Mullaghbawn	0-11 - 0-05	Tara	Parnell Park
	D Crawley 0-3, F McDonnell 0-3, C McParland 0-2, R Smith 0-2, P McGeeney 0-1.		P Rafter 0-2, C Quinn 0-1, S Lynch 0-1, D Carroll 0-1.	Referee: M Cutley (Galway)

== Semi-finals ==
18 February 1996 Semi-final	Éire Óg	0-12 - 0-06	Mullaghbawn	Páirc Tailteann
	A Keating 0-4, P McCarthy 0-2, C Hayden 0-2, J Hayden 0-2, G Ware 0-1, W Quinlan 0-1.		F McDonnell 0-4, D Crawley 0-1, P McNulty 0-1.

18 February 1996 Semi-final	Laune Rangers	0-08 - 0-06	Corofin	Cusack Park
	B O'Shea 0-2, M Hassett 0-2, T Fleming 0-2, C Kearney 0-1, J Shannon 0-1.		M Donnellan 0-3, E Steede 0-1, S Conlisk 0-1, T Burke 0-1.

== Final ==
17 March 1996 Final	Laune Rangers	4-05 - 0-11	Éire Óg	Croke Park
	G Murphy 1-2, B O'Sullivan 1-0, B O'Shea 1-0, T Byrnes 1-0 (pen), T Fleming 0-3.		C Hayden 0-3, A Keating 0-3, J Hayden 0-2, P McCarthy 0-1, J Morrissey 0-1, G Ware 0-1.	Referee: Pat McEnaney (Monaghan)

== Statistics ==
=== Miscellaneous ===
- Mullaghbawn won the Ulster Club Championship for the first time in their history.
- Laune Ranges won the Munster Club Championship for the first time in their history.
