= 1890 Kerry Senior Football Championship =

Gaelic football competition

- Dates: 24
- Teams: March - 20 July 1891
- Champions: Laune Rangers (2nd title); J. P. O'Sullivan (captain)
- Runners-up: Tralee Mitchels; Bill Brick (captain)

The 1890 Kerry Senior Football Championship was the second staging of the Kerry Senior Football Championship since its establishment by the Kerry County Board in 1889. The championship ran from March to 20 July 1890.

Laune Rangers entered the championship as the defending champions.

The final replay was played on 20 July 1890, between Laune Rangers and Tralee Mitchels, in what was their first meeting in the final. Laune Rangers won the match by 1–04 to 0–01 to claim their second successive championship title.

== Results ==
=== Final ===
13 July 1890 Final	Laune Rangers	0-00 - 0-00	Tralee Mitchels	Tralee Athletic Ground

20 July 1890 Final replay	Laune Rangers	0-06 - 0-03	Tralee Mitchels	Molahiffe Grounds

== Championship statistics ==
=== Miscellaneous ===
- Laune Rangers are the first team to retain the title.
- Tralee Mitchells qualify or the final for the first time.
