= Pa O'Sullivan =

Irish Gaelic footballer

Personal information
- Born: 16/12/77 Killorglin, County Kerry
- Height: 6 ft 1 in (185 cm)

Sport
- Sport: Gaelic football
- Position: Forward
Club
- Years: Club
- 1990s-2000s: Laune Rangers
Club titles
- Kerry titles: 4
- Munster titles: 1
- All-Ireland Titles: 1
College
- Years: College
- Tralee IT
College titles
- Sigerson titles: 2
Inter-county
- Years: County
- 1998-2000: Kerry
Inter-county titles
- Munster titles: )
- All-Irelands: 0
- NFL: 0
- All Stars: 0

Pa O'Sullivan was a Gaelic footballer from Killorglin, County Kerry. He played with Kerry at all levels during the 1990s. He was described as a 'star' and a 'teen sensation' for Kerry during the 90's.

== Club ==
He enjoyed much success at club level with Laune Rangers. In 1995 he won county Minor, Under and Senior titles with the club. He later won a Munster Senior Club Football Championship in 1995. He was later part of the panel as the club won the 1996 All-Ireland Senior Club Football Championship. Later in 1996 he won a second county and Munster titles.

== Schools ==
In 1996 he won a Corn Uí Mhuirí and Hogan Cup with the Intermediate School, Killorglin as the team's captain.

== Third level ==
He was one of the stats with Tralee IT teams that won Sigerson Cups in 1998 and 1999.

=== Hurling ===
He also played hurling with Kerry and Under 14 and 16 levels.

== Minor ==
He joined the Kerry minor team during the 1994 championship. Wins over Limerick, Cork and Clare saw O'Sullivan win a Munster title. He missed out on the All-Ireland semi-final win over Armagh. He returned for the All-Ireland final against Galway. He scored a point as Kerry took the title.

He was underage again in 1995, but Kerry lost out to Cork in the Munster first round after a replay.

== Under 21 ==
He then moved on to the counties Under 21 team. His first game was when he came on as a sub in the 1996 All-Ireland semi-final win over Galway

He was a requler in the team during the 1997 season. Win over Limerick where he scored 3 points, Clare where he scored 1-04 and Cork after a replay where he scored 1-04 and 4 points seen him win a Munster Under-21 Football Championship. Despite 6 points from O'Sullivan Kerry lost out to Meath in the All-Ireland semi-final.
