= Barry John Walsh =

Kerry Gaelic footballer

Personal information
- Native name: Barra Seán Breathnach (Irish)
- Born: 1990 (age 35–36) Tralee, Ireland
- Height: 1.85 m (6 ft 1 in)

Sport
- Sport: Gaelic football
- Position: Left corner forward
Club
- Years: Club
- 2007-2014: Kerins O'Rahilly's
Inter-county
Years	County	Apps (scores)
2009-2011	Kerry	2

Barry John Walsh (born 1990) plays Gaelic football at club level for Kerins O'Rahillys and at senior level for the Kerry county team. He is son of former Kerry footballer Seán Walsh and brother of former Kerry footballer Tommy Walsh who now plays in the Australian Football League (AFL) for Sydney Swans.

== Underage career ==
Walsh was a talented underage player in both football and soccer. He played international soccer for the u15 Irish soccer team and minor football for Kerry. The Kingdom wrote of his "sublime skills" during this period.

== Senior career ==
Barry John made his senior debut for the Kerry senior football team in 2009 as a substitute. He won the All-Ireland football final with Kerry in 2009.

He has been mentioned as a potential "star". Tadhg Kennelly spoke of the Kerry team and Walsh's membership on it, saying:

There are players there guaranteed to play for the next four or five years. It's not a team on its last legs. I've no doubt this team will be around for a long time. I think it's just the way we are able to produce footballers in Kerry. The way we're able to keep it going. Barry John Walsh, David Moran, Tommy (Walsh) is only 20. And that's exciting. For me, on a personal level, I'm thinking, "this is great, this team is going to be around for some time."

Walsh was not selected in Kerry's initial 2010 championship panel, although Kerry manager Jack O'Connor left open the possibility of bringing him in at a later stage.
