= Seán O'Sullivan (footballer) =

Irish Gaelic footballer

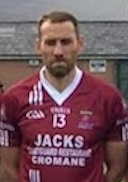

Personal information
- Native name: Seán Ó Súilleabháin (Irish)
- Nickname: Sean Bawn
- Born: County Kerry, Ireland

Sport
- Sport: Gaelic football
- Position: Right Half Forward
Club
- Years: Club
- Present: Cromane
Inter-county
Years	County	Apps (scores)
2002 - 2009 2012	Kerry	34 (1-30); 2 (0-1)
Inter-county titles
- Munster titles: 4
- All-Irelands: 4
- NFL: 3
- All Stars: 0

Seán O'Sullivan is an Irish sportsman who played Gaelic football for the Kerry senior football team and at club level with Cromane GAA club.

== Playing career ==
=== Junior ===
O'Sullivan played with the Kerry minor team in 1998. Wins over Waterford after a re-play and Limerick seen him win a Munster Minor Football Championship medal. O'Sullivan and co lost out to Laois in the All-Ireland semi-final.

=== Senior ===
O'Sullivan won his first All-Ireland Senior Football Championship in 2006, after a comprehensive victory over Mayo side in the final on 17 September 2006, in Croke Park. Seán had an exceptional season, being responsible for many of the passes which made Kieran Donaghy a real threat to defences in 2006.

2007 was another successful year for O'Sullivan and Kerry. The All-Ireland champions won the Munster title and progressed through the All-Ireland series to beat Cork in the final.

O'Sullivan was also a member of the Kerry squad that won its 36th All-Ireland Title in 2009. In December of that year, he announced his retirement from inter-county football.

== Managerial career ==
Since retirement O'Sullivan has become involved in coaching, selector and as a manager. O'Sullivan was announced as manager of South Kerry GAA in March 2021. This came alongside a role as a Kerry under-20 football team selector under the management of Declan O'Sullivan.
