= Morgan O'Shea =

Irish Gaelic footballer (born 1975)

Personal information
- Native name: Morgáin Ó Sé (Irish)
- Born: 1975 (age 50–51) Tralee, County Kerry, Ireland

Sport
- Sport: Gaelic football
- Position: Left corner-back
Club
- Years: Club
- Kerins O'Rahilly's
Club titles
- Kerry titles: 1
Inter-county
Years	County	Apps (scores)
1996-1998	Kerry	2 (0-00)
Inter-county titles
- Munster titles: 2
- All-Irelands: 1
- NFL: 1
- All Stars: 0

Morgan O'Shea (born 1975) is an Irish retired Gaelic footballer. His league and championship career with the Kerry senior team lasted three seasons, from 1996 to 1998.

O'Shea made his debut on the inter-county scene at the age of sixteen, when he was selected for the Kerry under-21 team. He enjoyed one championship season with the under-21 side, winning an All-Ireland medal in 1996. By this stage, he had also joined the Kerry senior team, making his debut during the 1995-96 league. Over the course of the next three seasons, O'Shea won one All-Ireland medal in 1997. He also won back-to-back Munster medals and one National Football League medal. All of these titles were won as a substitute.

Subsequent to relocating to Australia, O’Shea embarked upon a career in Australian Rules Football playing the "AFL 9s" version of the game. However, an inability to adapt to the oval ball and a run of calf injuries has limited his impact at this level. He has concentrated instead on his business and community service efforts.

== Honours ==
Kerins O'Rahilly's

- Kerry Senior Football Championship (1): 2002

Kerry

- All-Ireland Senior Football Championship (1): 1997
- Munster Senior Football Championship (2): 1997, 1998
- National Football League (1): 1996-97
