= Mícheál Ó Sé =

Irish Gaelic footballer

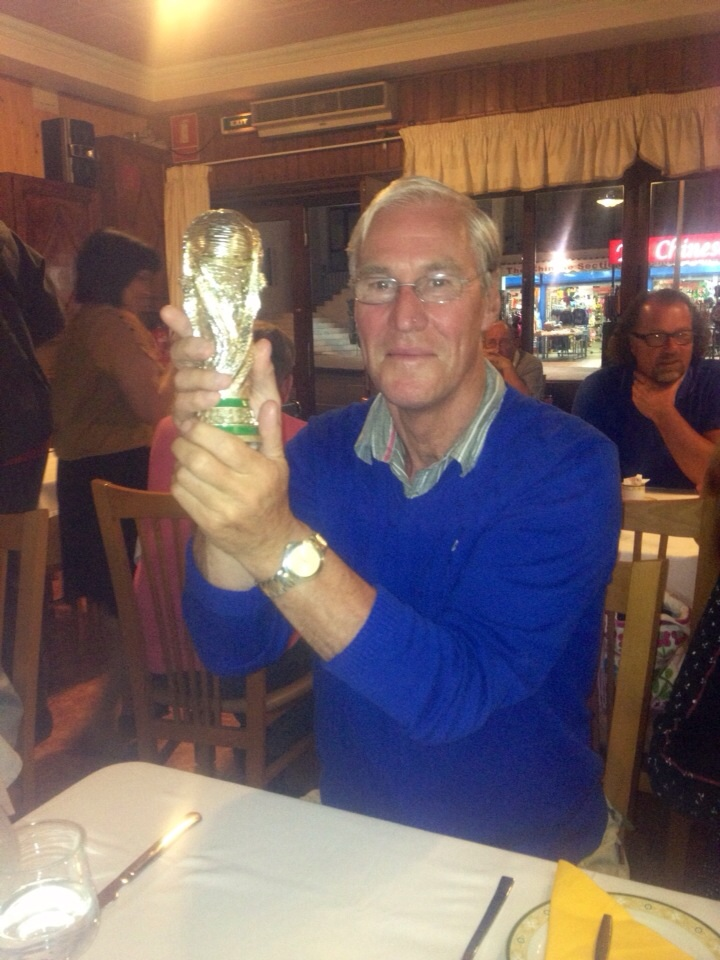

Personal information
- Native name: Mícheál Ó Sé (Irish)
- Nickname: Maidhc
- Born: 24 July 1946 (age 80) Ard Na Caithne, County Kerry
- Height: 6 ft 1 in (185 cm)

Sport
- Sport: Gaelic football
- Position: Wing Back
Club
- Years: Club
- 1960s - 1980s: An Ghaeltacht
Inter-county
Years	County	Apps (scores)
1969 - 1973	Kerry	16
Inter-county titles
- Munster titles: 3
- All-Irelands: 2
- NFL: 5
- All Stars: 0

Mícheál "Maidhc" Ó Sé (born 1946) is a former Irish sportsperson. Born in Ard na Caithne, County Kerry with his 4 siblings Páidí, MaryEllen, Antain and Caitlín. Míchéal went to school in St.Brendans Killarney (The Sem). He went on to study in Maynooth University. He played Gaelic football with his local club An Ghaeltacht and was a member of the Kerry senior inter-county team from 1968 until 1976 winning two All-Ireland medals, and All-Ireland medal with Kerry Minors and a 1976 club junior County championship title. Ó Sé provided commentary in Irish for RTÉ's The Sunday Gameand also on Radió na Gaeltachta where he also had his own show Saol Ó Dheas. He is married to Jacqueline O Shea of Ventry with whom he has three children, Tríona Ní Shé, Mícheál Óg Ó Sé and Ciara Ní Shé.
