= Donnchadh Walsh =

Kerry Gaelic footballer

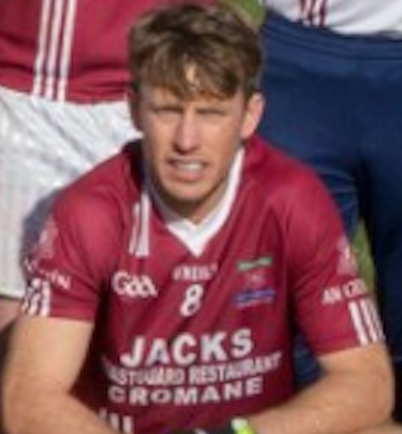
- Donnchadh Walsh in the Cromane GAA Club colours.

Personal information
- Native name: Donnchadh Breathnach (Irish)
- Born: 3 July 1984 (age 42) Tralee, Ireland
- Occupation: Physiotherapist
- Height: 1.88 m (6 ft 2 in)

Sport
- Sport: Gaelic football
- Position: Left Half Forward
Club
- Years: Club
- 2001–: Réalt na Mara, Cromane
College
- Years: College
- RCSI
Inter-county
Years	County	Apps (scores)
2003–2018	Kerry	52 (3-39)
Inter-county titles
- Munster titles: 8
- All-Irelands: 3
- NFL: 2
- All Stars: 1

Donnchadh Walsh (born 3 July 1984) is an Irish Gaelic footballer. He is a midfielder and forward and plays for his local Cromane club, the Mid Kerry divisional side and, formerly, at senior level for the Kerry county team, which he played for from 2003 to 2018.

== Playing career ==
=== Minor ===
Walsh was described as a 'star' and a 'teen sensation' for Kerry in the All-Ireland Minor Football Championship. He won the Munster Minor Football Championship with Kerry in 2001 and 2002.

== Under 21 ==
He later moved on to the Kerry Under 21 team. He first played during the 2003 Munster championship, coming on as a sub during wins over Limerick and Tipperary.

=== Inter-county ===
==== Early years ====
He was first selected for the senior squad in 2003. Despite his status as a highly promising player, Walsh did not make the breakthrough to All-Ireland Senior Football Championship football with Kerry until 2008. However, he was being tipped to feature for the Kerry seniors following an excellent 2007 season in the Kerry Senior Football Championship with Mid Kerry. He was also given his chance in the 2008 National Football League.

==== 2008–2013 ====
His first Munster Senior Football Championship game came in the final in July 2008. Walsh started and scored 1–1, but Cork defeated Kerry with a second-half comeback.

The following year, he won his first All-Ireland Senior Football Championship medal after Kerry beat Cork.

He was part of the team in 2011 when Kerry lost to Dublin in the All-Ireland final thanks to a brilliant match-winning point by Stephen Cluxton. This was to be the beginning of Dublin's dominance of Gaelic football.

In 2013, Walsh scored a goal past Cluxton in an epic All-Ireland semi-final between Kerry and Dublin in an eventual Dublin win.

==== 2014–2018 ====
In 2014, Kerry defied the odds to claim their 36th All-Ireland in a prolific year for the Kingdom with Walsh performing well throughout the season.

The one thing that had eluded Walsh was an All-Star and, in 2015, he was finally rewarded with the honour.

In September 2018, Walsh announced his retirement from inter-county football. In his statement, he said: "The greatest honour I ever could’ve imagined has been pulling on the green and gold jersey but, as with all good things, it must come to an end. That end has arrived." Walsh was lauded for releasing his retirement statement on Cromane GAA's social media platforms.

== Post-playing career ==
In April 2021, Kerry hurling manager Fintan O'Connor announced that Walsh would act as lead physio for his team.
