= John Evans (football manager) =

Irish Gaelic football manager

Personal information
- Born: County Kerry, Ireland

Sport
- Sport: Gaelic football
Club management
- Years: Club
- Laune Rangers / Kerins O'Rahilly's
	4	2	1
Inter-county management
- Years: Team
- 2008–2012 2012–2015 2017–2019: Tipperary; Roscommon; Wicklow
	0	0	0

John Evans is a Gaelic football manager. He has managed three senior inter-county teams: Tipperary, Roscommon and Wicklow.

Evans was the All-Ireland Senior Club Football Championship winning manager with Laune Rangers in 1996.

== Career ==
Evans is from Killorglin, County Kerry.

Before taking to inter-county management, he managed his local Laune Rangers team from the 1980s till the 2000s. He led them to the Kerry Championship in 1993 beating Annascaul, 1995 beating East Kerry and made it two in a row in 1996 by overcoming West Kerry. He led the Rangers to Munster Senior Club Football Championships in 1995 beating Cork side Clonakilty and in 1996 beating Tipperary side Moyle Rovers. The Laune Ranagers went to the 1996 All-Ireland Senior Club Football Championship, defeating Carlow side Éire Óg in the final at Croke Park. He later managed Tralee side Kerins O'Rahilly's for two seasons.

Evans was also manager of the Tipperary Under 21 team and was senior manager until March 2012. He is the new man tasked with getting Cill na Martra over the line in Cork. With players like Daniel Dineen, Michael Desmond, Tadhg Corkery and Gearoid Golden at his disposal, along with his own managerial experience, Cill na Martra will be one of the favourites to go up in 2022. He led Tipperary to back to back National Football League promotions in 2008 and 2009, bringing them from Division 4 to Division 2 and winning the Division 3 title in 2009. In 2010 he led Tipperary to their first Munster Under-21 Football Championship with a 1-07 to 1-06 win over Kerry in the final.

He was appointed director of football for Tipperary in January 2010, but GAA rules meant he might not have been able to hold this role while also being county manager.

He resigned as Tipperary county senior manager in mid-March 2012 following a heavy defeat to Sligo in an Allianz Football League Division 3 match at Markievicz Park.

After stepping down from the Tipperary job he joined up with Séamus McEnaney and Meath for the 2012 All-Ireland Senior Football Championship.

On 8 November 2012, Evans was named manager of the Roscommon senior football team on a two-year deal. He left that position in August 2015.

In August 2017, Wicklow appointed him as manager. He left that post in July 2019 without seeking to remain.
