= Paul O'Connor (Gaelic footballer) =

Irish hurler and Gaelic footballer

Personal information
- Nickname: Stretch
- Born: Kenmare, County Kerry
- Occupation: Accountant

Sport
- Sport: Gaelic football
- Position: Forward
Club
- Years: Club
- 2000's-: Kenmare
Inter-county
Years	County	Apps (scores)
2006-2010	Kerry	7 (0-07)
Inter-county titles
- Munster titles: 1
- All-Irelands: 3
- NFL: 2

Paul O'Connor is an Irish Gaelic footballer with the Kenmare GAA club and Kerry county team.

== Playing career ==
Paul O'Connor was Kerry's forward in the 2004 and 2005 All-Ireland Minor Football Championship, scoring 6 points in the 2004 final which Kerry lost to Tyrone. The following year, he was selected for the senior panel. The 19-year-old was a shock selection at left corner-forward for Kerry in the Munster Senior Football Championship final against Cork. It was his first All-Ireland Senior Football Championship start. The Cork side won. He remained in the panel up to 2010, mostly as a peripheral forward. However, he won the 2008 All-Ireland Under-21 Football Championship with Kerry, scoring 5 points in the final. He plays football and hurling with Kenmare.
