= Aodán Mac Gearailt =

Kerry Gaelic footballer

Personal information
- Native name: Aodán Mac Gearailt (Irish)
- Born: County Kerry, Ireland

Sport
- Sport: Gaelic football
- Position: Half/Full Forward
Club
- Years: Club
- 1990s–2000s 2000s: An Ghaeltacht
Inter-county
Years	County	Apps (scores)
1999–2003	Kerry	25 (5–25)
Inter-county titles
- Munster titles: 3
- All-Irelands: 2(1 sub)

Aodán Mac Gearailt is a footballer from County Kerry. He played with An Ghaeltacht and the Kerry teams in the 1990s and 2000s, winning County Championships in 2001 and 2003 he also won a Munster Club Championship in 2003 and played in the 2004 All Ireland Club Final but ended up on the losing side. He joined Cork side Ballygarvan in 2009 but returned to An Ghaeltacht after only one year with the Cork side. He won an All Ireland Senior Football Championship in 2000 with Kerry. He also won an All Ireland Under 21 medal in 1998. In 2009, he was made trainer of the Cork senior hurling team by Gerald McCarthy during the players strike.

He began working as Kerry selector under manager Jack O'Connor at the beginning of the 2025 season.
