= Cromane GAA =

Gaelic Athletic Association club in County Kerry, Ireland

- Cumann Lúchtchleas Gael Réalt na Mara
- Founded: 1984
- County: Kerry
- Colours: Maroon and white
- Grounds: Cromane GAA grounds
- Coordinates: 52°06′10″N 9°53′56″W

Playing kits
Standard colours

Réalt na Mara, Cromane, is a Gaelic Athletic Association football club from the village of Cromane, County Kerry, Ireland. The club's colours are maroon and white. The club, which fields teams from under-8 to senior level, derives its name from the local parish church, also called Réalt na Mara (or 'star of the sea' in English).

== History ==
There was a club in Cromane in the mid-1950s. In 1954, Pat O'Shea played for the Kerry minors as a Cromane player. The current club was affiliated to the Kerry County Board in 1985.

Cromane's first major triumph on the football field came in October 1994 when they claimed the Kerry Novice Championship beating Tuosist by 2-14 to 1-4 at Fitzgerald Stadium, Killarney. They also won the title in 1998 – again beating Tuosist in the final.

Cromane's first Mid Kerry title came in 1999 when they won the O'Sullivan Cup title. Three more titles followed in 2002, 2003, and 2006. In October 2018 Cromane claimed their fifth Mid Kerry O'Sullivan Cup win.

In March 2008, Cromane won the Munster Junior B Football Championship beating Cork's St Oliver Plunkett's in the final in Knockaderry, Limerick. The final score was Cromane 1–8, Oliver Plunkett's 0–8. Cromane claimed the honour of representing Kerry having won the 2007 Kerry Novice Championship (Kerry's version of Junior B) by beating Ballydonoghue in Austin Stack Park, Tralee. The final score was Cromane 0–11, Ballydonoghue 2–3.

The Cromane players that featured on the Glenbeigh/Glencar/Cromane Under-16 team in 2016.

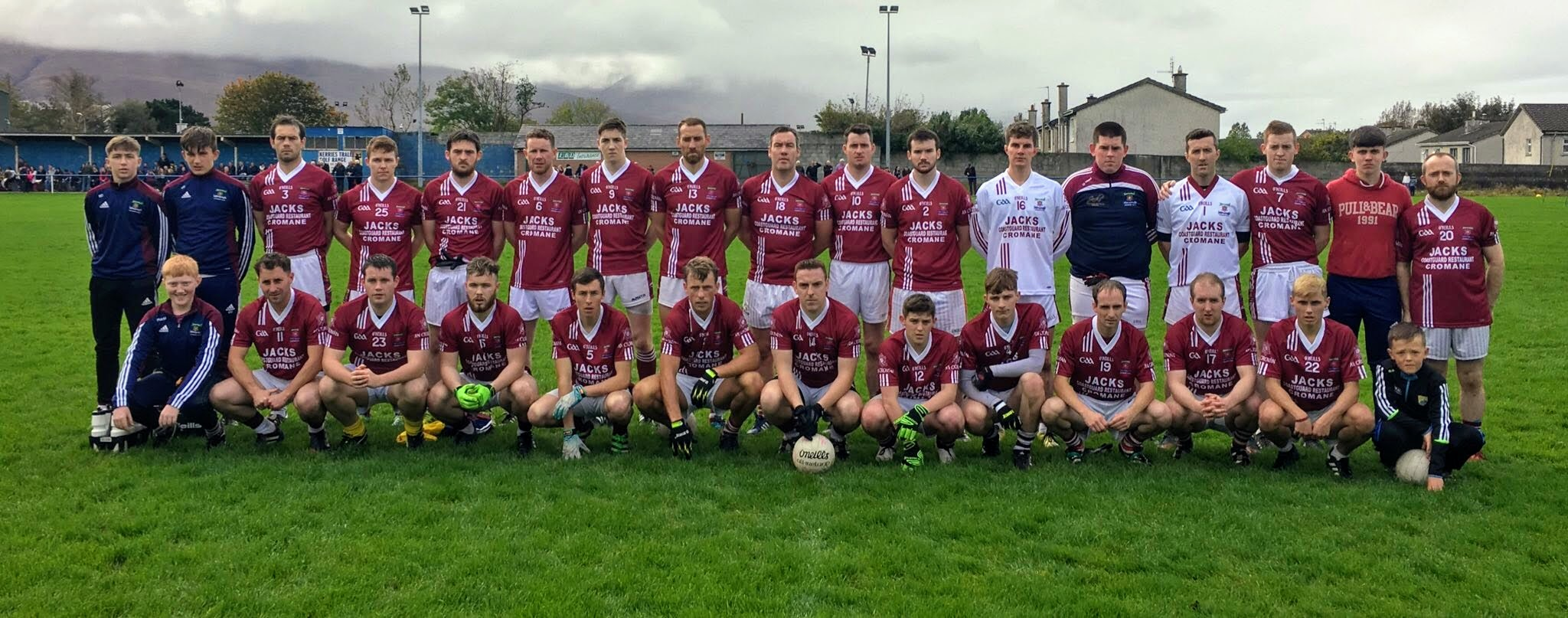
The Cromane senior football team that won the 2017 Kerry Novice championship. They beat Moyvane 1–12 to 0–12 in the final played on Sunday, 8 October, at Strand Road, Tralee.

In October 2017, the club won their fourth Kerry County Novice Championship title when they beat Moyvane by 1–12 to 0–12. This win meant that Cromane represented Kerry in the 2017 Munster Junior B Championship. Cromane met The Banner GAA club, from Ennis, County Clare, in the 2017 Munster Junior B Football Championship quarter-final on 20 November 2017. Cromane won by 0–10 to 0–5, setting up a semi-final meeting with Tipperary champions Cashel King Cormacs. Cromane also won the semi-final, by 2–14 to 4–3, reaching the 2017 Munster Junior B Football Championship final against Ballybrown of Limerick. Cromane lost the final by 0–11 to 1–10.

In October 2021, Cromane claimed their fifth county title when they defeated Asdee, by 3-9 to 0-8, in the Covid-delayed 2020 Novice County Championship final.

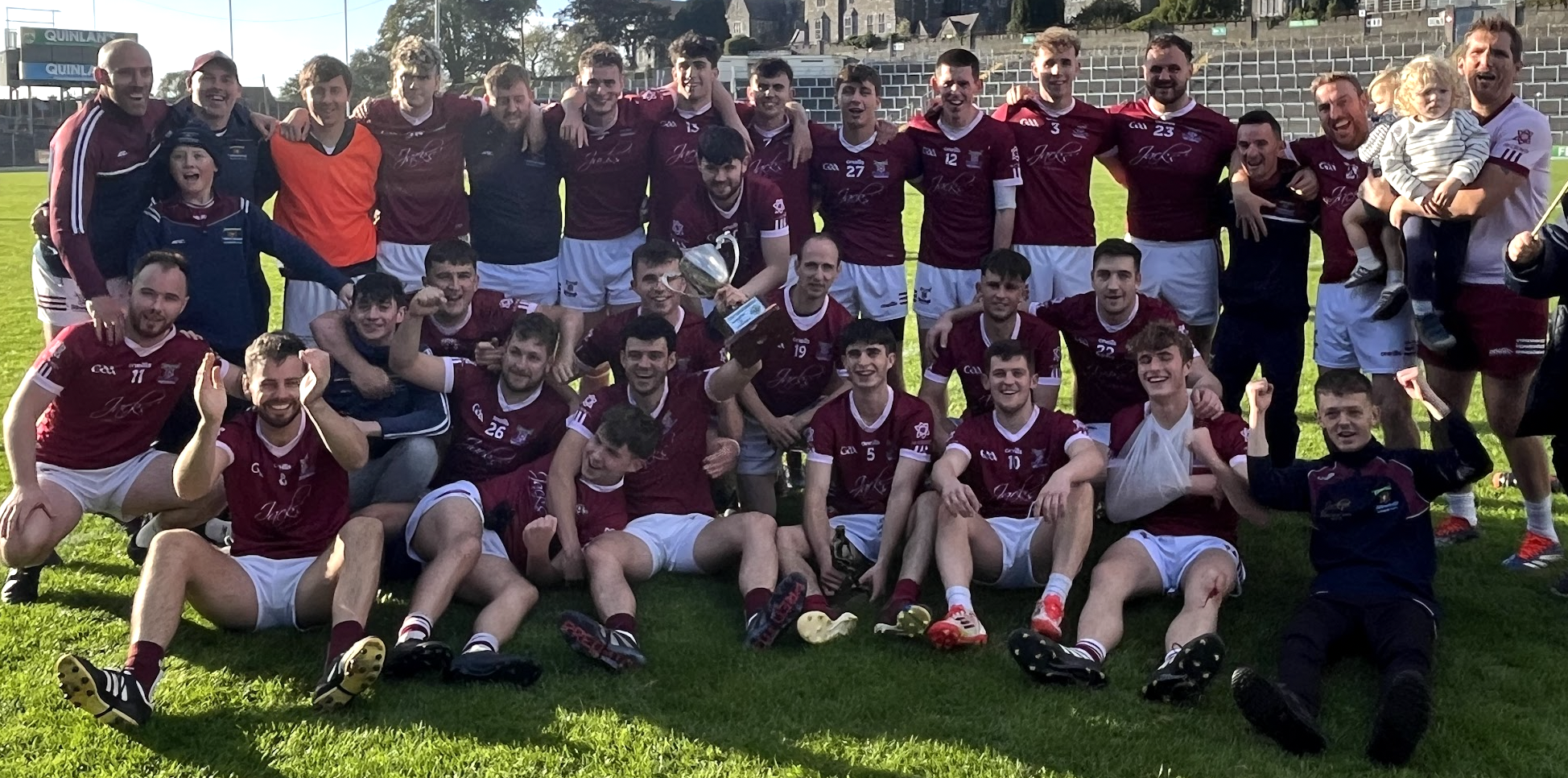
The Cromane team celebrate after their 5-14 to 1-19 win over Finuge in the 2025 Kerry County Novice final in Killarney in September 2025

In September 2025, Cromane won its sixth county title by defeating Finuge in the 2025 Novice County Championship final. The game, played in Fitzgerald Stadium on 27 September 2025, ended Cromane 5-14 to Finuge 1-19.

In March 2026, the club's senior men's team claimed their second Munster Junior B Championship title after defeating Cork's Ballyphehane (2-11 to 2-8) in the final.

== Players ==
Since the 1980s, when the current club was reformed, players such as 2015 GAA Football All-Star Donnchadh Walsh, Seán Walsh, Sean O'Sullivan and Deavan O'Flaherty have played with Kerry inter-county teams.

Donnchadh Walsh, who won All-Ireland medals with Kerry in 2007, 2009 and 2014, was named as left-half forward on the GAA Football All-Stars team in 2015. Seán Walsh, a brother of Donnchadh's, was a member of the Kerry under-21 football panel in 2010, while Deavan O'Flaherty was a member of the Kerry minor football panel in 2012. On 2 March 2003, both Donnchadh Walsh and Seán O'Sullivan lined out in the half-forward line for the Kerry senior football team in their National League win (2–11 to 0–14) over Dublin in Killarney. In November 2015, Donnchadh Walsh was the only Kerry player to be selected to play Australia in a one-off International Rules game in Croke Park. Seán O'Sullivan, who played for Kerry at minor and under-21 levels, progressed to the Kerry senior football team and won four All-Irelands with the county (in 2004, 2006, 2007, and 2009).

In May 2019, Kieran O'Sullivan represented Cromane on the Kerry minor football team.

In 2022, Liam O'Neill was selected for the Kerry minor panel that contested the Munster final against Cork in May 2022.

== Notable players ==
- Sean O'Sullivan - winner of four All-Ireland Senior Football titles with Kerry (2004, 2006, 2007, 2009)
- Donnchadh Walsh - winner of three All-Ireland titles with Kerry (2007, 2009, 2014)
