= Declan Quill =

Kerry Gaelic footballer

Declan Quill is an Irish Gaelic footballer who played at senior level for the Kerry county team and with the Kerins O'Rahilly's club in Tralee. A double All-Ireland Senior Football Championship winner, Quill is noted as a talented, skillful and prolific forward. Winning co manager of the All Ireland Senior Ladies Championship in 2024 with Kerry.

== Playing career ==
Quill was a star of Kerry teams in the All-Ireland Minor Football Championship and All-Ireland Under-21 Football Championship. He first appeared for the Kerry senior team in 2001. He played in the National Football League, and went on to come off the bench in three All-Ireland Senior Football Championship matches that year.

Quill continued to play with the Kerry panel, having great success in the National League, but never quite establishing himself in the starting line-up for the Championship. From 2001 to 2005, Declan Quill played in five consecutive All-Ireland Senior Football Championship semi-finals, but never appeared in the final. He did receive two All-Ireland medals as a substitute. Frustrated by the apparent lack of Championship opportunities given to him by management in the light of his League performances, he did not play with Kerry in 2006. He returned 2008.

Quill was joint manager of the Kerry ladies from 2020 onwards. A Declan Quill also does punditry with TG4 where he is a described as a "former Kerry footballer" and "a star forward with the Kerry seniors in his day", so it a fair guess that probably be him.
