= Mike Frank Russell =

Irish Gaelic footballer (born 1977)

Personal information
- Native name: Mícheál Prionsias Ruiséal (Irish)
- Born: 1977 (age 48–49) Killorglin, County Kerry
- Occupation: teacher
- Height: 5 ft 11 in (180 cm)

Sport
- Sport: Gaelic football
- Position: Right corner forward
Club
- Years: Club
- 1995-present: Laune Rangers
Club titles
- Kerry titles: 2 (1 as sub)
- Munster titles: 2 (1 as sub)
- All-Ireland Titles: 1 (1 as sub)
College titles
- Sigerson titles: 1
Inter-county
Years	County	Apps (scores)
1997-2009	Kerry	56 (8-130)
Inter-county titles
- Munster titles: 8
- All-Irelands: 5
- NFL: 4 ( 1 as sub)
- All Stars: 1

Mike Frank Russell (born 1977) is an Irish Gaelic footballer. He plays Gaelic football with his local club Laune Rangers and was a member at senior level of the Kerry county team from 1997 until 2009.

== Early life ==
Born in Killorglin, County Kerry in 1977, Russell was educated at Scoil Mhuire national school before later attending the Intermediate School in Killorglin. It was here that Russell's football skills were first developed and he became a key member of the school's senior team. In 1996, he captured a Corn Uí Mhuirí winners' medal as the Killorglin school captured the Munster colleges' title. An All-Ireland colleges' final appearance beckoned for Russell's side with St Patrick's of Maghera providing the opposition. Killorglin went on a goal scoring spree and proved more than a match for the point-scoring abilities of St Pat's. A 4-8 to 1-14 score line gave Killorglin the win and gave Russell an All-Ireland colleges' winners' medal.

Russell currently works as a teacher in Mercy Holy Cross primary school in Killarney. In 2009, he married Sinead O'Brien in Killorglin.

== Playing career ==
=== College ===
Russell attended the Institute of Technology, Tralee (ITT), where he lined out with the institute's senior football team and enjoyed some success. In the 1997–98 season, his side reached the final of the inter-varsities football competition. The University of Ulster provided the opposition on that occasion in Austin Stack Park; however, ITT won the game by 0-10 to 0-8, giving Russell a Sigerson Cup winners' medal.

=== Inter-county ===
Russell made his debut for Kerry in the 1997 season. He became a key forward for Kerry over the next decade, winning a total of five All-Ireland medals with Kerry. He was also selected for the All-Star team in 2000. He retired from inter-county football in 2009. Went to New York for summer 2009 to play for Roscommon New York who won the Championship

== Honours ==
=== Ireland ===
- International Rules Series (1)
  - 2001 (sub)

=== Kerry ===
- All-Ireland Senior Football Championship (5)
  - 1997, 2000, 2004, 2006, 2007;
  - runner-up 2002, 2005, 2008
- Munster Senior Football Championship (8)
  - 1997, 1998, 2000, 2001, 2003, 2004, 2005, 2007; runner-up 1999, 2006, 2008
- National Football League (Division 1) (4)
  - 1996-97, 2004, 2006, 2009 (sub)
- National Football League (Division 2) (1)
  - 2002
- All-Ireland Under-21 Football Championship (2)
  - 1996, 1998
- Munster Under-21 Football Championship (3)
  - 1996 (sub), 1997, 1998 (sub)
- All-Ireland Minor Football Championship (1)
  - 1994
- Munster Minor Football Championship (1)
  - 1994

=== Intermediate School Killorglin ===
- All-Ireland Senior Colleges' Football Championship (1)
  - 1996
- Munster Senior Colleges' Football Championship (1)
  - 1996

=== Institute of Technology, Tralee ===
- Sigerson Cup (1)
  - 1997-98

=== Laune Rangers ===
- All-Ireland Senior Club Football Championship (1)
  - 1996 (sub)
- Munster Senior Club Football Championship (1)
  - 1995 (sub), 1996
- Kerry Senior Football Championship (2)
  - 1995 (sub), 1996; runner-up 1997, 2003, 2004
- Kerry Under-21 Football Championship (1)
  - 1995
- Kerry Minor Football Championship (1)
  - 1995
- Kerry County Football League – Division 1 (4)
  - 1995, 1996, 1997, 1998

=== Awards ===
- GAA GPA All Stars Awards (1)
  - 2000

Awards
Preceded by Mark O'Reilly (Meath)	All-Ireland Senior Football Final; Man of the Match; 2000 (Drawn game)	Succeeded by Seamus Moynihan (Kerry)
