= An Ghaeltacht GAA =

Gaelic Athletic Association club in County Kerry

An Ghaeltacht
- CLG na Gaeltachta / Cumann Caide na Gaeltachta
- Founded: 1933
- County: Kerry
- Colours: White with Red sash
- Grounds: Gort Ghallarais (Gallaras)
- Coordinates: 52°10′53.14″N 10°21′53.19″W

Playing kits
standard kit	change kit

Senior Club Championships
	All Ireland	Munster champions	Kerry champions
Football:	-	1	2

An Ghaeltacht is a Gaelic Athletic Association club in Corca Dhuibhne, County Kerry. In 2026, the club won the All-Ireland Intermediate Club Football Championship having previously won the 2025 Kerry Intermediate Football Championship.

They also compete in the West Kerry Football Championship, Division 2 of the Kerry County League and the annual All Ireland Comórtas Peile na Gaeltachta.

== History ==
CLG na Gaeltachta, or simply An Ghaeltacht, was founded in 1933 and covers the Gaeltacht (Irish-speaking) area of Corca Dhuibhne or the Dingle Peninsula apart from the town of Dingle itself. Lios Póil and An Clochán also have their own GAA clubs.

== Honours ==
- All-Ireland Intermediate Club Football Championship (1): 2026
- Comórtas Peile na Gaeltachta: (3) 1999, 2017, 2019
- Munster Senior Club Football Championship: (1) 2003
- Munster Intermediate Club Football Championship: (2) 2017, 2025
- Kerry Senior Football Championship: (2) 2001, 2003
- Kerry Senior Club Football Championship: (3) 2001, 2002, 2005
- Kerry Intermediate Football Championship: (4) 1933, 1998, 2017, 2025
- Kerry Junior Football Championship: (2) 1976, 1993
- Kerry Novice Football Championship: (1) 1992
- Kerry U21 Football Championship: (1) 2014
- Kerry County Senior League Division 1: (1) 2007
- Kerry County Senior League Division 2: (1) 1988
- Kerry County Senior League Division 3: (1) 1986
- Kerry County Senior Development League: (2) 2022, 2023
- Kerry County Junior League: (4) 2007, 2008, 2019, 2020
- West Kerry Senior Football Championship: (12) 1970, 1991, 1997, 1998, 2000, 2001, 2002, 2006, 2008, 2015, 2017, 2025
- Cahill Cup (Junior cup): (1) 2024

== Notable players ==
- Brian Ó Beaglaoich - Two time All-Ireland Senior Football Championship winner. All-Star winner.
- Páidí Ó Sé - Eight time All-Ireland Senior Football Championship winner. 1985 All-Ireland Senior Football Championship winning captain. Five time All-Star. Two time All-Ireland Senior Football Championship winning manager.
- Dara Ó Cinnéide - 2004 All-Ireland Senior Football Championship winning captain.
- Marc Ó Sé - Five time All-Ireland Senior Football Championship winner. Three time All-Star. Texaco Footballer of the Year 2007. GAA/GPA Footballer of the Year 2007.
- Darragh Ó Sé - Six time All-Ireland Senior Football Championship winner.Four time All-Star.
- Tomás Ó Sé - Five time All-Ireland Senior Football Championship winner. Five time All-Star. Texaco Footballer of the Year 2009. GAA/GPA Footballer of the Year 2004
- Aodán Mac Gearailt - Two time All-Ireland Senior Football Championship winner.
- Rónán Ó Flatharta - Three time All-Ireland winner with Kerry.
- Tomás Ó Flatharta - Intercounty manager with Westmeath, Laois and Galway.
- Tomás Ó Luing - All-Ireland winner in 1959 and 1962.
- Mícheál Ó Sé - Two time All-Ireland Senior Football Championship winner.
