= South Kerry GAA =

Gaelic sports club in County Kerry, Ireland

South Kerry
- County: Kerry
- Colours: Green & Gold

Playing kits
Standard colours

Senior Club Championships
	All Ireland	Munster champions	Kerry champions
Football:	0	0	10

South Kerry is a division of Kerry GAA. The South Kerry division consists of club teams. It is primarily known for Gaelic football, though some hurling is also played. The division fields teams in the Kerry Senior Football Championship, Kerry Minor Football Championship, and Kerry Under-21 Football Championship.

== Member clubs ==
=== Football clubs (9) ===
- Derrynane (Now Sneem-Derrynane)
- Dromid Pearses
- Renard
- Skellig Rangers
- Sneem (Now Sneem-Derrynane)
- St Mary's
- St Michael's/Foilmore
- Valentia Young Islanders
- Waterville

=== Hurling clubs (7) ===
The division draws hurling clubs from several divisions other than just south kerry:

- Tralee Parnells (Tralee)
- Kilgarvan (Kenmare District)
- Kenmare Shamrocks (Kenmare District)
- Dr Crokes (East Kerry)
- St Patrick's (East Kerry)
- Duagh (Feale Rangers)
- Rathmore (East Kerry)

=== Divisional teams ===
South Kerry has won 10 Kerry Senior Football Championships, most recently beating Killarney Legion GAA in November 2015. They have never won the Kerry Senior Hurling Championship.

== Divisional competitions ==
Divisional competitions, organised by South Kerry GAA, include:

- South Kerry Senior Football Championship
- South Kerry Senior Hurling Championship
- South Kerry Under-21 Football Championship
- South Kerry Minor Football Championship

=== South Kerry Senior Football Championship ===
The South Kerry Senior Football Championship is a Gaelic football competition between clubs affiliated to the South Kerry division. The championship is played every year. St Mary's is the most successful club, with 34 titles won in its history.

=== South Kerry Senior Hurling Championship ===
Kilgarvan GAA has won the South Kerry Senior Hurling Championship 11 times (in 1999, 2003, 2006, 2007, 2008, 2009, 2010, 2014, 2016, 2018 and 2019).

== Notable players ==
- John Egan
- Maurice Fitzgerald
- Ger Lynch
- Mick O'Dwyer
- Mick O'Connell
- Ger O'Driscoll
- Jack O'Shea
- Declan O'Sullivan
- Bryan Sheehan
- Killian Young

== Honours ==
- Kerry Senior Football Championship (10): 1955, 1956, 1958, 1981, 1982, 2004, 2005, 2006, 2009, 2015
- Kerry Under 21 Football Championship (12): 1984, 1987, 1988, 1991, 1992, 1993, 2003, 2004, 2005, 2007, 2010, 2016
- Kerry Minor Football Championship (9): 1963, 1970, 1971, 1975, 1992, 1999, 2000, 2001, 2005
