= Kerins O'Rahilly's GAA =

Gaelic games club in County Kerry, Ireland

Kerins O'Rahilly's
- Céirín Uí Rathaile
- Founded: 1927
- County: Kerry
- Nickname: The Narriepickers, The Narries
- Colours: Blue & White
- Grounds: Strand Road, Ballyrickard
- Coordinates: 52°16′01.07″N 9°42′57.50″W

Playing kits
Standard colours

Senior Club Championships
	All Ireland	Munster champions	Kerry champions
Football:	-	1	6

Kerins O'Rahilly's' Gaelic Athletic Association club from Tralee, County Kerry, Ireland. They are based in the Strand Road area of the town. They are in Division 1 of the county league which they won in 2006, and compete in the Intermediate Championship.

== History ==
The club was founded in 1927 and was named for The O'Rahilly, a Kerryman killed in the Easter Rising, and Charlie Kerins of the later IRA, executed during the Second World War.

== Notable players ==
- John Dowling 1955 All-Ireland Senior Football Championship winning captain.
- Jas Murphy 1953 All-Ireland Senior Football Championship winning captain.
- Dan Spring 1940 All-Ireland Senior Football Championship winning captain.
- Dan O'Keeffe Seven time All-Ireland Senior Football Championship winner. Member of GAA Team of the Century and Millennium.
- Seán Walsh Seven time All-Ireland Senior Football Championship winner and two-time All-Star.
- Vinnie Murphy, All-Ireland Senior Football Championship winner in 1995 with Dublin.
- David Moran Three time All-Ireland Senior Football Championship winner and two-time All-Star.
- Tommy Walsh Two time All-Ireland Senior Football Championship winner and 2008 GAA/GPA Young Footballer of the Year.
- Barry John Keane, Four time Munster Senior Football Championship winner as well as an All-Ireland Senior Football Championship winner in 2014.
- Jack Savage, All-Ireland Senior Football Championship winner in 2022.

== Achievements ==
- Kerry Senior Football Championship Winners (6) 1933, 1939, 1953, 1954, 1957, 2002
- Munster Senior Club Football Championship Winners (1) 2022
- Kerry Club Football Championship Winners (3) 2009, 2010, 2022
- Kerry County League Div 1: Winners (4) 1985, 1999, 2006, 2013
- Kerry Under-21 Football Championship: Winners (1) 2015
- Kerry Under 21 Club Championship Winners (2) 2013, 2009
- Kerry Minor Football Championship Winners (1) 2006
- Kerry Minor County League Division 1 Winners (3) 1999, 2007, 2008
