= Laune Rangers GAA =

Gaelic games club in County Kerry, Ireland

Laune Rangers
- Fánaithe na Leamhna
- Founded: 1888
- County: Kerry
- Colours: Blue & White
- Grounds: J. P. O'Sullivan Park, Killorglin
- Coordinates: 52°06′19.65″N 9°47′58.55″W

Playing kits
Standard colours

Senior Club Championships
	All Ireland	Munster champions	Kerry champions
Football:	1	2	12
Ladies' football:	-	-	1

Laune Rangers is a Gaelic football and Hurling club based in town of Killorglin, County Kerry, Ireland. The club is affiliated to Kerry GAA. Rangers won the All-Ireland Senior Club Football Championship in 1996.

== History ==
The club was formed in 1888 by two teachers. The newly formed club won the Kerry County Championship of 1889 and 1890. In 1890, after again winning the County Championship, Rangers represented Kerry in the All-Ireland series. They defeated Clondrohid 3-6 to 0-5 and won the Munster final but lost the All-Ireland Final. The first recorded match the club played was against John Mitchels in 1888. The club's finest hour came when they won the All-Ireland Senior Club Football Championship in 1996 beating Éire Óg of Carlow in the final.

Famous players have included Mike & Liam Hassett, Peter Crowley and Mike Frank Russell, all of whom have won All-Ireland Senior Football Championship titles with the Kerry county team.

== Important club dates ==
- 1888 - Club formed.
- 1889 - First Kerry Championship.
- 1909 - J.P O’Sullivan dies.
- 1913 - Paddy Kennelly was the first Killorglin man to win an All- Ireland Medal.
- 1928 - Killorglin Hurlers took their place in the County Hurling Championships for the first time.
- 1958 - First Mid Kerry Senior Football Championship title
- 1972 - First under-age County title at U-12.
- 1989 - First Kerry Minor Football Championship
- 1996 - Managed by John Evans, Laune Rangers win All-Ireland Final.
- 2006 - The first Kerry Camogie County Board is formed, with Wayne Doyle of Laune Rangers elected as chairman.

== Notable players ==
- Peter Crowley 2014 All-Ireland Senior Football Championship and 2014 All-Star winner
- Timmy Fleming Former Kerry captain
- Mike Hassett 1996–97 National Football League and 1997 Munster Senior Football Championship winning captain.
- Liam Hassett - 1997 All-Ireland Senior Football Championship winning captain
- Mike Frank Russell five time All-Ireland Senior Football Championship and 2000 All-Star winner.
- Danny Cahill 1988 All-Ireland Minor Football Championship winning captain.
- John Evans 1996 All-Ireland Senior Club Football Championship winning manager. Tipperary, Roscommon and Wicklow manager.

== Honours ==
=== Football ===
- Kerry Senior Football Championship (12): 1887, 1888, 1889, 1890, 1892, 1893, 1900, 1911, 1989, 1993, 1995, 1996
- Munster Senior Club Football Championship (2): 1995, 1996
- All-Ireland Senior Club Football Championship (1): 1995–96
- Kerry Club Football Championship (3): 1966, 1998, 1999
- Kerry County Football League – Division 1 (9): 1986, 1987, 1989, 1992, 1994, 1995, 1996, 1997, 1998
- Munster Club League (1): 2000
- Kerry Novice Football Championship (1): 1970
- Kerry Under 21 Football Championship (2): 1990,
- Kerry Minor Football Championship (5): 1977, 1987, 1988, 1989, 1995
- Mid Kerry Senior Football Championship (29): 1958, 1963, 1966, 1967, 1969, 1970, 1973, 1983, 1984, 1985, 1986, 1987, 1988, 1990, 1991, 1992, 1993, 1994, 1995, 1996, 1997, 1999, 2000, 2002, 2003, 2004, 2005, 2006, 2023
- East Kerry Senior Football Championship (1): 1932

=== Ladies' Football ===
- Kerry Senior Ladies' Football Championship (1): 2013

=== Hurling ===
- Kerry Junior Hurling Championship: (1) 2003

== County championship winning captains ==
Football

- 1889: J.P. O'Sullivan
- 1890: J.P. O'Sullivan
- 1892: J.P. O'Sullivan
- 1893: J.P. O'Sullivan
- 1900: John. P. Murphy
- 1911: Dan Hayes
- 1989: Peter Lyons
- 1993: James O'Shea
- 1995: Gerard Murphy
- 1996: Mark O'Connor

Preceded by Kilmacud Crokes	All-Ireland Senior Club Football Champions; 1996	Succeeded by Crossmaglen Rangers
