= 2026 Kerry Intermediate Football Championship =

Gaelic football tournament season

Tournament details
- County: Kerry
- Year: 2026
- Trophy: Fenian Cup
- Sponsor: Kerry Petroleum
- Date: 8 August - 13 September
- Teams: 16
- Defending champions: An Ghaeltacht

Winners
- Champions: Fossa (1st win)
- Manager: Jerome Stack
- Captain: Sam Buckley
- Qualify for: Munster Intermediate Club Football Championship

Runners-up
- Runners-up: Kilcummin
- Manager: James Foley
- Captain: Paul O'Shea

Promotion/Relegation
- Promoted team(s): Keel
- Relegated team(s): St Mary's

Other
- Website: http://www.kerrygaa.ie/

The 2026 Kerry Intermediate Football Championship (known as the Kerry Petroleum Intermediate Club Football Championship for sponsorship reasons) was the latest instalment of the Kerry Intermediate Football Championship. The tournament consisted of Kerry GAA's 16 intermediate club teams.

The championship was won for the first time by Fossa who defeated Kilcummin in the final and qualify to represent Kerry in the 2026 Munster Intermediate Club Football Championship.

== Format ==
The 16 clubs were drawn into four groups of 4 teams each. Each team is to play the other three teams in their group once, having one home match, one away match and one at a neutral venue. The top two teams from each group will advance to the quarter-finals with each group winner playing the runner-up of another group at home.

The winners of the championship will be promoted to the 2027 Kerry Club Football Championship and will represent Kerry in the 2026 Munster Intermediate Club Football Championship. The 4 teams who finish bottom of their group will advance to the relegation play-off semi-finals. The losers of the semi-finals will then contest the final play-off with the losers of this match dropping down to the Junior Premier Championship for 2027.

== Teams ==
Ballymacelligott were promoted to the Internediate Championship for 2026 having won the Junior Premier Championship in 2025. They replace An Ghaeltacht who were promoted to the Senior Championship.

Team	Location	Division	In championship since	Championship titles	Last championship title
Ballydonoghue	Lisselton	Shannon Rangers	2021	0	—
Ballymacelligott	Ballymacelligott	St Kieran's	2026	0	—
Beaufort	Beaufort	Mid Kerry	2019	2	2000
Castleisland Desmonds	Castleisland	St Kieran's	2004	3	1981
Firies	Firies	East Kerry	2025	0	—
Fossa	Fossa	East Kerry	2023	0	—
Glenbeigh/Glencar	Glenbeigh	Mid Kerry	2017	0	—
Glenflesk	Glenflesk	East Kerry	2004	0	—
Gneeveguilla	Gneeveguilla	East Kerry	2022	1	2010
John Mitchels	Tralee	St Brendan's	2009	0	—
Kerins O'Rahilly's	Tralee	St Brendan's	2024	0	—
Kilcummin	Kilcummin	East Kerry	2021	2	2018
Killarney Legion	Killarney	East Kerry	2022	1	2005
Laune Rangers	Killorglin	Mid Kerry	2016	0	—
Listowel Emmets	Listowel	Feale Rangers	2024	1	2002
St. Mary’s	Cahersiveen	South Kerry		2	2015

== Group Stage ==
=== Group 1 ===
Pos	Team	Pld	W	D	L	Diff	Pts	Qualification
1	Fossa	3	3	0	0	+44	6	Advance to Quarter-finals
2	Ballymacelligott	3	2	0	1	+24	4	Advance to Quarter-finals
3	Gneeveguilla	3	1	0	2	-19	2	
4	Glenbeigh/Glencar	3	0	0	3	-49	0	Advance to Relegation play-offs

Source: Kerry GAA Fixtures/Results/Tables

Round 1

9 August 2026 Round 1	Gneeveguilla	1–17 (20) – (31) 1–28	Fossa
14:00 IST (UTC+1)		(HT: 0–14 - 0–09)		Venue: Fitzgerald Stadium
	Gls: S Finnegan; Pts: C O'Connor 5 (1tp, 1f, 1'45), S Crowley 4 (2tp), S O'Sullivan 4 (1tp), P O'Leary 3, O O'Leary 1	Report	Gls: E O'Shea; Pts: D Clifford 11 (3tp, 1tpf, 2fs), E O'Shea 7 (2tp, 2fs), T O'Gorman, R Colleran 2 each, E Talbot, J Hallissey, P Clifford, D Ryan, C O'Shea 1 each	Referee: B Griffin (Clounmacon)

9 August 2026 Round 1	Glenbeigh/Glencar	0–16 (16) – (34) 6–16	Ballymacelligott
15:45 IST (UTC+1)		(HT: 0–04 - 3–12)		Venue: Austin Stack Park
		Report		Referee: M Hennessy (Ballyduff)

Round 2

15 August 2026 Round 2	Glenbeigh/Glencar	0–12 (12) – (40) 5–25	Fossa
19:00 IST (UTC+1)		(HT: 0–03 - 3–10)		Venue: Glenbeigh
	Pts: T Cahill 4 (2tp), L Smith 3 (1tp), F O'Sullivan, C Teahan 1 (1f), J Brosnan, K O'Sullivan, S Quirke 1 each	Report	Gls: M Kennelly, T O'Gorman, H Buckley, D Clifford, E O'Shea 1 each Pts: E O'Shea 8 (1tp), H Buckley 4, P Clifford 3 (1tp), D Clifford 2 (1tp), T O'Shea 2, H Kelly, J Hallissey, C O'Shea, T O'Gorman, F Doyle, F Colleran 1 each	Referee: E Ó Muircheartaigh (Dingle)

15 August 2026 Round 2	Ballymacelligott	2–20 (26) – (15) 1–12	Gneeveguilla
19:00 IST (UTC+1)		(HT: 0–09 - 0–09)		Venue: Ballymacelligott
	Gls: J Joy, D Daly 1 each Pts: M Quirke 6 (5fs), D Daly 5 (1tp, 1f), J Joy 4 (2fs), M McKivergan 3 (1tpf), N Collins, D Keane 1 each	Report	Gls: S O'Sullivan; Pts: O O'Leary 6 (4fs), C Buckley 2 (2fs), C O'Connor 2 (1'45), P Brosnan, S O'Sullivan 1 each	Referee: E Moran (Ballydonoghue)

Round 3

22 August 2026 Round 3	Fossa	1–25 (28) – (22) 3–13	Ballymacelligott
16:00 IST (UTC+1)		(HT: 1–11 - 0–07)		Venue: Fossa
		Report		Referee: M Murphy (St Michael's/Foilmore)

22 August 2026 Round 3	Gneeveguilla	1–16 (19) – (16) 1–13	Glenbeigh/Glencar
18:00 IST (UTC+1)		(HT: 0–10 - 0–03)		Venue: Gneeveguilla
		Report		Referee: P Hayes (Kerins O'Rahilly's)

=== Group 2 ===
Pos	Team	Pld	W	D	L	Diff	Pts	Qualification
1	Kilcummin	3	3	0	0	+9	6	Advance to Quarter-finals
2	John Mitchels	3	2	0	1	+16	4	Advance to Quarter-finals
3	Ballydonoghue	3	1	0	2	-19	2	
4	Firies	3	0	0	3	-6	0	Advance to Relegation play-offs

Source: Kerry GAA Fixtures/Results/Tables

Round 1

8 August 2026 Round 1	Firies	2–15 (21) – (23) 1–20	John Mitchels
16:00 IST (UTC+1)		(HT: 0–06 - 0–10)		Venue: Ballymacelligott
				Referee: M Murphy (St Michael's/Foilmore)

9 August 2026 Round 1	Ballydonoghue	0–11 (11) – (18) 0–18	Kilcummin
15:00 IST (UTC+1)		(HT: 0–09 - 0–08)		Venue: Brosna
		Report		Referee: G Kissane (Kerins O'Rahilly's)

Round 2

15 August 2026 Round 2	Firies	1–14 (17) – (18) 2–12	Kilcummin
19:00 IST (UTC+1)		(HT: 0–06 - 1–04)		Venue: Farranfore
		Report		Referee: P Dowling (Ballylongford)

16 August 2026 Round 2	John Mitchels	4–19 (31) – (16) 1–13	Ballydonoghue
13:00 IST (UTC+1)		(HT: 4–10 - 0–08)		Venue: Ballyseedy
		Report		Referee: C O'Connor (Glenbeigh/Glencar)

Round 3

23 August 2026 Round 3	Ballydonoghue	1–12 (15) – (12) 2–06	Firies
15:00 IST (UTC+1)		(HT: 1–05 - 1–05)		Venue: Coolard
		Report		Referee: D Clifford (Laune Rangers)

23 August 2026 Round 3	Kilcummin	2–14 (20) – (19) 0–19	John Mitchels
16:00 IST (UTC+1)		(HT: 2–05 - 0–09)		Venue: Kilcummin
		Report		Referee: J Murphy (Ballyduff)

=== Group 3 ===
Pos	Team	Pld	W	D	L	Diff	Pts	Qualification
1	Laune Rangers	3	3	0	0	+33	6	Advance to Quarter-finals
2	Listowel Emmets	3	2	0	1	+11	4	Advance to Quarter-finals
3	Killarney Legion	3	1	0	2	-7	2	
4	St. Mary’s	3	0	0	3	-37	0	Advance to Relegation play-offs

Source: Kerry GAA Fixtures/Results/Tables

Round 1

1 August 2026 Round 1	St. Mary's	0–12 (12) – (25) 2–19	Killarney Legion
19:00 IST (UTC+1)		(HT: 0–08 - 1–08)		Venue: Killorglin
		Report		Referee: P Curtin (Brosna)

8 August 2026 Round 1	Laune Rangers	3–12 (21) – (20) 0–20	Listowel Emmets
17:30 IST (UTC+1)		(HT: 3–08 - 0–09)		Venue: Austin Stack Park
	Gls: A O'Neill 2, G Hassett 1 Pts: A O'Neill 4 (1f), J Tyther 3 (2fs), O Birmingham 2, S Gannon 1 (1f), D Mangan, C Moriarty 1 each	Report	Pts: D Lynch 8 (1tpf, 1tp, 4fs), S Tarrant 6 (1tpf, 1f), C Mulvihill 1 (1f), A Kennelly, E Healy, JJ Grimes, D Keane 1 each	Referee: E Horan (Glenflesk)

Round 2

16 August 2026 Round 2	Laune Rangers	2–18 (24) – (7) 0–07	St. Mary's
15:00 IST (UTC+1)		(HT: 1–08 - 0–04)		Venue: Killorglin
		Report		Referee: F Clifford (Listry)

16 August 2026 Round 2	Listowel Emmets	1–15 (18) – (13) 2–07	Killarney Legion
16:00 IST (UTC+1)		(HT: 0–08 - 1–05)		Venue: Listowel
	Gls: B Sweeney; Pts: D Lynch 5 (2tp, 1f), S Tarrant 4 (1tp, 1f), J McVeigh, D Keane 2 each, P Walsh, B Sweeney 1 each	Report	Gls: C Gammell, F Murphy 1 each Pts: R O'Grady 3 (2fs), P Lucey 2 (1tp), F Murphy 1 (f), P McCarthy 1	Referee: G Kissane (Kerins O'Rahilly's)

Round 3

23 August 2026 Round 3	Killarney Legion	2–10 (16) – (31) 3–22	Laune Rangers
15:30 IST (UTC+1)		(HT: 1–05 - 1–08)		Venue: Dirreen
	Gls: R Leen, O Fleming 1 each Pts: R O'Grady 4 (2fs, 1tpf), C Keane 2 (1f), W Shine 2, F Murphy 1 (f), J O'Donoghue 1	Report	Gls: E Clifford 2, S Gannon 1 Pts: A O'Neill 7 (1tpf), J Tyther 5 (5fs), E Clifford 2 (1tp), D Cleary, S Gannon, M Leslie 2 each, O Birmingham, G Hassett 1 each	Referee: E Ó Muircheartaigh (Dingle)

23 August 2026 Round 3	St. Mary's	2–11 (17) – (24) 2–18	Listowel Emmets
15:30 IST (UTC+1)		(HT: 1–12 - 0–05)		Venue: Cahersiveen
		Report		Referee: T Corbett (Milltown/Castlemaine)

=== Group 4 ===
Pos	Team	Pld	W	D	L	Diff	Pts	Qualification
1	Beaufort	3	3	0	0	+26	6	Advance to Quarter-finals
2	Glenflesk	3	1	0	2	-3	2	Advance to Quarter-finals
3	Kerins O'Rahilly's	3	1	0	2	-6	2	
4	Castleisland Desmonds	3	1	0	2	-17	2	Advance to Relegation play-offs

Source: Kerry GAA Fixtures/Results/Tables

Round 1

8 August 2026 Round 1	Beaufort	4–20 (32) – (24) 3–15	Glenflesk
18:00 IST (UTC+1)		(HT: 3–09 - 0–06)		Venue: Lewis Road
	Gls: C Kennedy 3, K Coffey 1 Pts: F Hallissey 6 (1tpf, 1f, 1'45), L Carey 4, J O'Connor 3 (1tpf), S O'Brien 2 (1tp), N O'Connor 2, D o'Connor, C Kennedy, K Coffey 1 each	Report	Gls: Dylan Roche 2, Darragh Riche 1 (1p); Pts: J Kelleher 4 (2tp), K O'Sullivan, L Crowley 2 (2tp) each, Dylan Roche, L O'Brien 2 each, T Bowler, Darragh Roche 1 (1f) each, C Cronin 1	Referee: E Ó Muircheartaigh (Dingle)

8 August 2026 Round 1	Castleisland Desmonds	1–14 (17) – (32) 4–20	Kerins O'Rahilly's
19:00 IST (UTC+1)		(HT: 1–06 - 2–07)		Venue: Currow
		Report		Referee: D Clifford (Laune Rangers)

Round 2

15 August 2026 Round 2	Beaufort	1–16 (19) – (15) 1–12	Castleisland Desmonds
16:00 IST (UTC+1)		(HT: 0–07 - 0–06)		Venue: Beaufort
	Gls: C Kennedy; Pts: F Hallissey 5 (4fs), L Carey 5, C Kennedy 4 (1tp), J Coffey, K Coffey 1 each	Report	Gls: T Lynch; Pts: T Hickey 5 (3fs), A O'Donoghue 4 (1tp, 1f), T Lynch 3	Referee: M Murphy (St Michael's/Foilmore)

16 August 2026 Round 2	Glenflesk	1–16 (19) – (12) 0–12	Kerins O'Rahilly's
16:00 IST (UTC+1)		(HT: 0–08 - 0–07)		Venue: Glenflesk
	Gls: L Crowley; Pts: M Kelliher 2 (2'45), D Roche 2 (1f), J Kelliher, P D'Arcey 2 each, K O'Sulivan, L O'Brien, C Cronin 1 each	Report	Pts: D O'Connor 8 (2tpf, 2fs, 1tp), BJ Keane 2 (1tp), T Hoare 1 (f), C O'Sullivan 1	Referee: P Curtin (Brosna)

Round 3

22 August 2026 Round 3	Castleisland Desmonds	2–12 (18) – (16) 1–13	Glenflesk
18:30 IST (UTC+1)		(HT: 1–05 - 0–06)		Venue: Castleisland
	Gls: A O'Donoghue, T Hickey 1 each Pts: A O'Donoghue 6 (1tp), PJ Curtin 2, T Hickey 1 (f), CH O'Connor, B Leonard, T Lynch 1 each	Report	Gls: C Cronin; Pts: J Kelliher, P D'Arcy, Darragh Roche 3 each, Dylan Roche 2 (1f), D O'Brien, L Crowley 1 each	Referee: C O'Connor (Glenbeigh/Glencar)

22 August 2026 Round 3	Kerins O'Rahilly's	0–12 (12) – (26) 1–23	Beaufort
18:30 IST (UTC+1)		(HT: 0–07 - 1–13)		Venue: Strand Road
	Pts: D O'Connor 7 (2tpf, 2fs), T Kennedy 2 (1tp), T Hoare 1 (f), BJ Keane, C Hayes 1 each	Report	Gls: C Kennedy; Pts: F Hallissey 8 (2tpf, 2fs), C Kennedy 5 (1tp), L Carey 5, D O'Connor 3, J Caffey, N O'Connor 1 each	Referee: E Walsh (Rathmore)

== Knockout Stage ==
=== Quarter-finals ===
29 August 2026
17:30 IST (UTC+1)
Quarter-final 1

Report

Kilcummin	2–16 (22) – (14) 0–14	Ballymacelligott
(HT: 0–10 - 0–09)
Gls: M Casey, P O'Leary 1 each Pts: K McCarthy 7 (7fs), M Casey 3, C Foley 2, B Kealy 1 (1'45), P O'Shea, P O'Leary, M O'Shea 1 each		Pts: D Daly 5 (1tp, 1f), M Quirke 3 (1tpf, 1f), N Collins 3, D Keane 2 (tp), J Joy 1

Kilcummin
Referee: S Joy (Laune Rangers)

30 August 2026
13:00 IST (UTC+1)
Quarter-final 2

Report

Fossa	1–19 (22) – (18) 2–12	Listowel Emmets
(HT: 0–11 - 1–05)
Gls: T O'Gorman; Pts: D Clifford 12 (2tp, 1tpf, 1f), E O'Shea 2 (tp), P Clifford 2, T O'Gorman, F Doyle 1 each		Gls: J Carmody, D Lynch 1 each Pts: A Carey 3, D Lynch 2 (2fs), JJ Grimes 2 (1f), L McElligott 2, P Walsh, J McVeigh, S Tarrant 1 each

Fossa
Referee: P Hayes (Kerins O'Rahilly's)

30 August 2026
13:00 IST (UTC+1)
Quarter-final 3

Report

Beaufort	4–14 (26) – (18) 0–18	John Mitchels
(HT: 2–06 - 0–07)
Gls: M Breen, D O'Connor, F Hallissey, C Kennedy 1 each Pts: F Hallissey 5 (1'45, 1f), J O'Connor 4, N O'Connor, C Kennedy 2 each, J Coffey 1		Gls: G White 10 (2tpf, 1tp, 2fs), C Holden, D Cunnane 2 (2fs) each, S Broderick 1 (1'45), S Moloney, M Kelliher, J Duggan 1 each

Beaufort
Referee: P Dowling (Ballylongford)

30 August 2026
16:00 IST (UTC+1)
Quarter-final 4

Report

Laune Rangers	0–16 (16) – (23) 4–11	Glenflesk
(HT: 0–07 - 0–05)
Pts: A O'Neill 5 (1tpf, 1f), J Tyther 4 (3fs), G Hassett 2 (1f), O Birmingham, S Gannon 2 each, E Clifford 1		Gls: D O'Brien, C Lynch, Darragh Roche, Dylan Roche 1 each Pts: Darragh Roche 5 (2fs), Dylan Roche, L O'Brien 2 each, K O'Sullivan, J Kelliher 1 each

Killorglin
Referee: S Mulvihill (St Senan's)

=== Semi-finals ===
6 September 2026
13:00 IST (UTC+1)
Semi-final 1

Report

Glenflesk	1–14 (17) – (21) 1–18 (a.e.t.)	Kilcummin
(HT: 1–05 - 1–06) (FT: 1–11 - 1–11)
Gls: Darragh Roche; Pts: Darragh Roche 5 (2fs), L Crowley 4 (1tp, 1'45), L O'Donoghue 2, K O'Sullivan, T Bowler, Dylan Roche 1 each		Gls: K McCarthy; Pts: S O'Leary 5 (1tp), M Casey, P O'Leary 5 each, M O'Shea, C Foley, M Keane 1 each

Tullig
Referee: D Clifford (Laune Rangers)

6 September 2026
16:00 IST (UTC+1)
Semi-final 2

Report

Fossa	2–25 (31) – (30) 2–24 (a.e.t.)	Beaufort
(HT: 0–07 - 1–10) (FT: 2–18 - 2–18)
Gls: M Rennie, E O'Shea 1 each Pts: D Clifford 16 (4tp, 1tpf, 1f), P Clifford 5 (1tp, 1'45), E O'Shea 1 (f), M Rennie, T O'Gorman, D Ryan 1 each		Gls: J Coffey, F Hallissey 1 each Pts: C Kennedy 7 (3tp), F Hallissey 5 (3fs, 1'45, 1mk), D O'Connor 5 (1f), L Carey 3 (1tp), M Breen 2 (1tp), N O'Connor 2

Lewis Road
Referee: E Ó Muircheartaigh (Dingle)

=== Final ===
13 September 2026
15:30 IST (UTC+1)
Final

Report

Kilcummin	0–22 (22) – (26) 0–26	Fossa
(HT: 0–12 - 0–10)
Pts: P O'Shea 4 (1tp, 1tpf), K Murphy 3 (1tp), M O'Shea, M Casey 3 each, P O'Leary, M Keane 2 each, B Kealy 1 (1'45), K McCarthy 1 (1f), J Williams, C Foley, J Fogarty 1 each		Pts: D Clifford 15 (3tp, 2tpf, 2fs), P Clifford 4 (2tp), D Ryan 2, E O'Shea 1 (1f), P Sheehan, E Talbot, R Colleran, T O'Gorman 1 each

Fitzgerald Stadium
Referee: E Ó Muircheartaigh (Dingle)

Source: Kerry GAA Fixtures/Results/Tables

== Relegation play-offs ==
=== Semi-finals ===
29 August 2026
15:00 IST (UTC+1)
Semi-final 1

Castleisland Desmonds	1–12 (15) – (17) 0–17	Firies
(HT: 1–05 - 0–05)

Currow
Referee: E Ó Muircheartaigh (Dingle)

30 August 2026
14:00 IST (UTC+1)
Semi-final 2

Glenbeigh/Glencar	2–19 (25) – (11) 1–08	St. Mary’s
(HT: 0–11 - 1–04)

Cahersiveen
Referee: E Horan (Glenflesk)

=== Play-off final ===
6 September 2026
15:00 IST (UTC+1)
Play-off final

Report

Castleisland Desmonds	0–18 (18) – (15) 2–09	St Mary's
(HT: 0–12 - 1–01)

Killorglin
Referee: F Clifford (Listry)

St Mary's are relegated to the Kerry Premier Junior Football Championship for 2027

Source: Kerry GAA Fixtures/Results/Tables

== See also ==
- 2026 Kerry Club Football Championship
- 2026 Kerry Senior Football Championship
