= 2024 Kerry Intermediate Football Championship =

Gaelic football tournament season

Tournament details
- County: Kerry
- Year: 2024
- Trophy: Fenian Cup
- Sponsor: Kerry Petroleum
- Date: 26 July - 9 November
- Teams: 16
- Defending champions: Milltown/Castlemaine

Winners
- Champions: Austin Stacks (1st win)
- Manager: Billy Lee
- Captain: Greg Horan
- Qualify for: Munster Intermediate Club Football Championship

Runners-up
- Runners-up: Laune Rangers
- Manager: Liam Hassett
- Captain: Fiachra Clifford

Promotion/Relegation
- Promoted team(s): Firies
- Relegated team(s): none

Other
- Website: http://www.kerrygaa.ie/

The 2024 Kerry Intermediate Football Championship (known as the Kerry Petroleum Intermediate Club Football Championship for sponsorship reasons) was the latest instalment of the Kerry Intermediate Football Championship. The tournament consisted of Kerry GAA's 16 intermediate club teams. The championship was won for the first time by Austin Stacks which sees them return to the Kerry Senior Club Football Championship for 2025 after an absence of two years. They also qualify to represent Kerry in the Munster Intermediate Club Football Championship.

== Format ==
The championship had a similar format to 2023. The draw took place at Austin Stack Park, Tralee on 15th February, 2024. The 16 clubs were drawn into four groups of 4 teams each with the semi-final and final losers from 2023 (Killarney Legion, Austin Stacks, Fossa) and the Kerry SFC relegated team (Kerins O'Rahilly's) being seeded. Each team played the other three teams in their group once, having one home match, one away match and one at a neutral venue. The top two teams from each group advanced to the quarter-finals with each group winner playing the runner-up of another group at home.

In a change to the 2023 format there was no relegation to the Junior Premier Championship in 2024. This is due to changes to the Senior Championships which will commence in 2025.

== Teams ==
=== Team changes ===
- Kerins O'Rahilly's (relegated from the Senior Club Championship) replaced Milltown/Castlemaine who were promoted to the senior championship.
- Listowel Emmets (winners of the Junior Premier Championship) were promoted to the intermediate championship and replaced Currow who were relegated.

=== 2024 Teams ===
Team	Location	Club's Divisional Side	In championship since	Championship titles	Last championship title
An Ghaeltacht	Gallarus	West Kerry	2019	3	2017
Austin Stacks	Tralee	St Brendan's	2023	0	—
Ballydonoghue	Lisselton	Shannon Rangers	2021	0	—
Beaufort	Beaufort	Mid Kerry	2019	2	2000
Castleisland Desmonds	Castleisland	St Kieran's	2004	3	1981
Fossa	Fossa	East Kerry	2023	0	—
Glenbeigh-Glencar	Glenbeigh	Mid Kerry	2017	0	—
Glenflesk	Glenflesk	East Kerry	2004	0	—
Gneeveguilla	Gneeveguilla	East Kerry	2022	1	2010
John Mitchels	Tralee	St Brendan's	2009	0	—
Kerins O'Rahilly's	Tralee	St Brendan's	2024	0	—
Kilcummin	Kilcummin	East Kerry	2021	2	2018
Killarney Legion	Killarney	East Kerry	2022	1	2005
Laune Rangers	Killorglin	Mid Kerry	2016	0	—
Listowel Emmets	Listowel	Feale Rangers	2024	1	2002
St. Mary's	Cahersiveen	South Kerry	2011	2	2015

== Group stage ==
=== Group A ===
Pos	Team	Pld	W	D	L	Diff	Pts	Qualification
1	Austin Stacks	3	2	1	0	+24	5	Advance to Quarter-finals
2	Glenbeigh-Glencar	3	2	0	1	-5	4	Advance to Quarter-finals
3	An Ghaeltacht	3	1	1	1	+13	3	
4	John Mitchels	3	0	0	3	-32	0	

Round 1

27 July 2024 Round 1	Austin Stacks	2–15 (21) – (9) 0–09	John Mitchels	Strand Road
16:00 IST (UTC+1)		(HT: 2–06 – 0–06)
	Gls: J O'Connor, C Purcell 1 each Pts: P Lane 5 (1m), J O'Shea, G Horan 2 each, A Heinrich, C Horan, C Purcell, D Kirby, M O'Donnell, S O'Callaghan 1 each	Report	Pts: M Kelliher 3 (2fs), A O'Donoghue 2 (1f), P Nammock 1 (1'45), C Holden, S O'Connor, C Hurley 1 each	Referee: P O'Sullivan (Firies)

27 July 2024 Round 1	Glenbeigh-Glencar	2–09 (15) – (11) 0–11	An Ghaeltacht	Keel
18:00 IST (UTC+1)		(HT: 1–06 – 0–08)
		Report		Referee: F Clifford (Listry)

Round 2

3 August 2024 Round 2	Austin Stacks	0–08 (8) – (8) 0–08	An Ghaeltacht	Connolly Park
18:00 IST (UTC+1)
				Referee: T Corbett (Milltown/Castlemaine)

4 August 2024 Round 2	John Mitchels	0–10 (10) – (13) 0–13	Glenbeigh-Glencar	Ballyseedy
13:00 IST (UTC+1)
				Referee: E Moriarty (Dingle)

Round 3

10 August 2024 Round 3	An Ghaeltacht	2–21 (27) – (10) 0–10	John Mitchels	Gallarus
16:00 IST (UTC+1)

10 August 2024 Round 3	Glenbeigh-Glencar	1–10 (13) – (25) 4–13	Austin Stacks	Glenbeigh
16:00 IST (UTC+1)

=== Group B ===
Pos	Team	Pld	W	D	L	Diff	Pts	Qualification
1	Kerins O'Rahilly's	3	3	0	0	+11	6	Advance to Quarter-finals
2	Laune Rangers	3	2	0	1	+11	4	Advance to Quarter-finals
3	Kilcummin	3	1	0	2	-1	2	
4	Listowel Emmets	3	0	0	3	-21	0	

Round 1

26 July 2024 Round 1	Kerins O'Rahilly's	2–09 (15) – (13) 0–13	Laune Rangers	Austin Stack Park
19:30 IST (UTC+1)		(HT: 0–06 – 0–03)
	Gls: T Hoare, BJ Keane 1 each Pts: T Kennedy 3 (1f), C Coffey 2, G Dillon, D Moran, BJ Keane, T Walsh 1 each	Report	Pts: E Hassett 5 (2fs), J Burke, F Clifford 2 each, E Clifford, E O'Sullivan, P Daly, J Tyther 1 each	Referee: D Casey (Scartaglin)

27 July 2024 Round 1	Listowel Emmets	0–09 (9) – (11) 0–11	Kilcummin	Castleisland
19:00 IST (UTC+1)		(HT: 0–07 – 0–06)
		Report		Referee: E Moriarty (Dingle)

Round 2

4 August 2024 Round 2	Kerins O'Rahilly's	1–16 (19) – (11) 0–11	Listowel Emmets	Strand Road
13:00 IST (UTC+1)
				Referee: E Walsh (Rathmore)

4 August 2024 Round 2	Laune Rangers	2–12 (18) – (16) 2–10	Kilcummin	Killorglin
13:00 IST (UTC+1)
				Referee: G Murphy (Skellig Rangers)

Round 3

11 August 2024 Round 3	Kilcummin	1–12 (15) – (16) 0–16	Kerins O'Rahilly's	Kilcummin
16:00 IST (UTC+1)
				Referee: G Kelliher (Beaufort)

11 August 2024 Round 3	Listowel Emmets	0–14 (14) – (25) 3–16	Laune Rangers	Listowel
16:00 IST (UTC+1)
				Referee: F Clifford (Listry)

=== Group C ===
Pos	Team	Pld	W	D	L	Diff	Pts	Qualification
1	Beaufort	3	3	0	0	+12	6	Advance to Quarter-finals
2	Fossa	3	2	0	1	+9	4	Advance to Quarter-finals
3	Castleisland Desmonds	3	1	0	2	-5	2	
4	Ballydonoghue	3	0	0	3	-16	0	

Round 1

27 July 2024 Round 1	Fossa	1–10 (13) – (14) 0–14	Beaufort	Fitzgerald Stadium
17:00 IST (UTC+1)		(HT: 0–02 – 0–08)
	Gls: P Clifford 1 Pts: D Clifford 4 (4fs), E O'Shea 2 (2fs), P Clifford 2 (1f), C O'Shea, M O'Dwyer 1 each	Report	Pts: F Hallissey 3 (2fs, 1'45), C Kennedy 3, D O'Connor, L Carey, J O'Connor 2 each, S O'Brien 1 (1'45), M Breen 1	Referee: JM Fitzgerald (Abbeydorney)

27 July 2024 Round 1	Ballydonoghue	2–11 (17) – (19) 3–10	Castleisland Desmonds	Brosna
19:00 IST (UTC+1)		(HT: 1–03 – 1–04)
		Report		Referee: T Corbett (Milltown/Castlemaine)

Round 2

3 August 2024 Round 2	Fossa	1–18 (21) – (16) 0–16	Castleisland Desmonds	Fossa
17:30 IST (UTC+1)		(HT: 1–08 – 0–07)
	Gls: D Clifford 1 Pts: D Clifford 9 (4fs), E O'Shea 3, C O'Shea, P Clifford 2 each, M Rennie, M Dwyer 1 each	Report	Pts: G O'Connor 4 (3fs), T Hickey 3 (3fs), L Brosnan 3, I Brosnan, D Finnegan 2 each, B Leonard, A Donoghue 1 each	Referee: E Moriarty (Dingle)

4 August 2024 Round 2	Beaufort	2–15 (21) – (12) 1–09	Ballydonoghue	Beaufort
13:00 IST (UTC+1)
				Referee: D Casey (Scartaglin)

Round 3

10 August 2024 Round 3	Ballydonoghue	3–07 (16) – (21) 1–18	Fossa	Coolard
19:00 IST (UTC+1)

10 August 2024 Round 3	Castleisland Desmonds	1–18 (21) – (23) 2–17	Beaufort	Castleisland
19:00 IST (UTC+1)

=== Group D ===
Pos	Team	Pld	W	D	L	Diff	Pts	Qualification
1	Glenflesk	3	3	0	0	+6	6	Advance to Quarter-finals
2	Killarney Legion	3	2	0	1	+16	4	Advance to Quarter-finals
3	Gneeveguilla	3	1	0	2	+1	2	
4	St. Mary's	3	0	0	3	-23	0	

Round 1

27 July 2024 Round 1	Gneeveguilla	3–12 (21) – (7) 0–07	St. Mary's	Killorglin
18:30 IST (UTC+1)		(HT: 1–05 – 0–03)
		Report		Referee: P Curtin (Brosna)

27 July 2024 Round 1	Glenflesk	1–17 (20) – (19) 1–16	Killarney Legion	Tullig
19:00 IST (UTC+1)		(HT: 0–09 – 0–10)
	Gls: Darragh Roche 1 (1p); Pts: Darragh Roche 10 (7fs), T Bowler 2 (1f), K O'Sullivan, K Bowler, J O'Donoghue, C Cronin, Dylan Roche 1 each	Report	Gls: P McCarthy 1 Pts: J O'Donoghue 7 (2fs), D O'Sullivan 6 (3fs), J Lyne, C Gammell, M Devlin 1 each	Referee: E Walsh (Rathmore)

Round 2

3 August 2024 Round 2	Killarney Legion	0–20 (20) – (9) 0–09	Gneeveguilla	Direen
19:00 IST (UTC+1)		(HT: 0–09 – 0–06)
	Pts: P McCarthy 4, D O'Sullivan 3 (3fs), D Lyne, D Sheahan, J O'Donoghue 2 each, D O'Doherty, J Lyne, R Leen, J Alade, Cian Gammell, E O'Sullivan, Conor Gammell 1 each	Report	Pts: S O'Keeffe 4 (2fs), C Herlihy, S O'Sullivan 2 each, P Doyle 1 (1m)	Referee: P O'Sullivan (Firies)

4 August 2024 Round 2	Glenflesk	1–07 (10) – (7) 0–07	St. Mary's	Glenflesk
13:00 IST (UTC+1)
				Referee: J Enright (Glengarriff)

Round 3

11 August 2024 Round 3	Gneeveguilla	1–14 (17) – (19) 2–13	Glenflesk	Gneeveguilla
13:00 IST (UTC+1)

11 August 2024 Round 3	St. Mary's	0–07 (7) – (13) 1–10	Killarney Legion	Cahersiveen
13:00 IST (UTC+1)

== Knockout stage ==
=== Quarter-finals ===
17 August 2024
17:00 IST(UTC+1)
Quarter-final 1

Report

Beaufort	0–10 (10) – (11) 0–11	Glenbeigh-Glencar
(HT: 0–04 – 0–05)
Pts: F Hallissey, J O'Connor 2 (2fs) each, N Breen 2, R Murphy, D O'Connor, C Kennedy, L Carey 1 each		Pts: G O'Grady 4 (1'45), D O'Sullivan 3 (2fs), L Smith 2, L Roche, C Teahan 1 each

Beaufort
Referee: E Walsh (Rathmore)

17 August 2024
18:00 IST(UTC+1)
Quarter-final 2

Report

Kerins O'Rahilly's	0–13 (13) – (17) 1–14	Fossa
(HT: 0–04 – 1–08)
Pts: J Savage 9 (6fs), T Kennedy 2, C Coffey, D O'Connor 1 each		Gls: E Talbot 1 Pts: D Clifford 5 (2fs), E O'Shea 2 (1f), C O'Shea, P Clifford 2 each, R Colleran, D O'Keeffe, H Buckley 1 each

Strand Road
Referee: B O'Shea (Keel)

18 August 2024
13:00 IST(UTC+1)
Quarter-final 3

Report

Glenflesk	2–18 (24) – (28) 3–19 (a.e.t.)	Laune Rangers
(HT: 0–10 – 0–06) (FT: 0–16 – 1–13)
Gls: S Doherty, B O'Donoghue 1 each Pts: D Roche 9 (3fs), T Bowler 5 (5fs), J Moynihan 2, M Mullane, I Roche 1 each		Gls: G Hassett, E Hassett, D Cleary 1 each Pts: E Hassett 6 (1f), F Clifford, M Leslie 3 each, J Tyther 2 (2fs), J Burke 2, S Cleary, O Bermingham, D Cleary 1 each

Glenflesk
Referee: E Moran (Ballydonoghue)

18 August 2024
16:00 IST(UTC+1)
Quarter-final 4

Report

Austin Stacks	2–09 (15) – (13) 0–13	Killarney Legion
(HT: 1–06 – 0–07)
Gls: A Curran 1 (p), P Lane 1 Pts: P Lane 3 (2fs), J O'Connor 2, P O'Sullivan, B Shanahan, F Mangan, G Horan 1 each		Pts: D O'Sullivan 7 (6fs), C Gammell 2, D Lyne 1 (f), S Kearney, E O'Sullivan, P McCarthy 1 each

Connolly Park
Referee: E Moriarty (Dingle)

=== Semi-finals ===
25 August 2024
14:00 IST(UTC+1)
Semi-final 1

Report

Glenbeigh-Glencar	1–07 (10) – (14) 0–14	Austin Stacks
(HT: 0–03 – 0–07)
Gls: G O'Grady 1 Pts: G O'Grady 3 (3fs), C Teahan 1 (f), D O'Sullivan, J Brosnan, A O'Connor 1 each		Pts: P Lane 4 (2fs), D McKivergan 3, D Casey, C Purcell 2 each, J Nagle, J O'Connor, J O'Shea 1 each

Fitzgerald Stadium
Referee: E Horan (Glenflesk)

25 August 2024
16:00 IST(UTC+1)
Semi-final 2

Report

Laune Rangers	1–19 (22) – (20) 3–11	Fossa
(HT: 1–08 – 3–08)
Gls: T Whittleton 1 Pts: E Hassett 10 (5fs), J Tyther 4 (3fs), C Moriarty, O Bermingham, T Whittleton, F Clifford, M Leslie 1 each		Gls: D Clifford 3 (1p); Pts: D Clifford 8 (6fs), E OShea 2, H Buckley 1

Fitzgerald Stadium
Referee: E Moriarty (Dingle)

=== Final ===
8 September 2024
15:00 IST (UTC+1)
Final

Report

Austin Stacks	0–12 (12) – (12) 2–06 (a.e.t.)	Laune Rangers
(HT: 0–06 – 1–01) (FT: 0–10 – 2–04)
Pts: P Lane 3 (2fs), D McKivergan 2 (2fs), M Tansley 2 (1f, 1'45), D Kirby, C Purcell, M O'Donnell, C Horan, D O'Brien 1 each		Gls: S Cleary, M Leslie 1 each Pts: E Hassett 2 (1f), F Clifford 2, M Leslie, M Diggin 1 each

Fitzgerald Stadium
Referee: Edmund Walsh (Rathmore)

9 November 2024
13:30 WET (UTC+0)
Final Replay

Report

Austin Stacks	1–14 (17) – (5) 0–05	Laune Rangers
(HT: 0–06 – 0–02)
Gls: C Purcell 1 Pts: D McKivergan 3 (3fs), G Horan 3, P Lane 2 (1f), D Casey, J Nagle, A Heinrich, D Kirby, D O'Brien, B O'Sullivan 1 each		Pts: E Hassett 2 (2fs), P Daly 2 (1f), J Tyther 1

Fitzgerald Stadium
Referee: Pádraig O'Sullivan (Firies)

== See also ==
- 2024 Kerry Senior Football Championship
- 2024 Kerry Club Football Championship
