= 2025 Kerry Intermediate Football Championship =

Gaelic football tournament season

Tournament details
- County: Kerry
- Year: 2025
- Trophy: Fenian Cup
- Sponsor: Kerry Petroleum
- Date: 2 August - 14 September
- Teams: 16
- Defending champions: Austin Stacks

Winners
- Champions: An Ghaeltacht (4th win)
- Manager: Feargal Ó Sé
- Captain: Franz Sauerland
- Qualify for: Munster Intermediate Club Football Championship

Runners-up
- Runners-up: Fossa
- Manager: Jerome Stack
- Captain: Cian O'Shea

Promotion/Relegation
- Promoted team(s): Ballymacelligott
- Relegated team(s): n/a

Other
- Matches played: 31
- Total scored: 63–940 (1,129)
- Website: http://www.kerrygaa.ie/

The 2025 Kerry Intermediate Football Championship (known as the Kerry Petroleum Intermediate Club Football Championship for sponsorship reasons) was the latest instalment of the Kerry Intermediate Football Championship. The tournament consisted of Kerry GAA's 16 intermediate club teams. The championship was won for a fourth time by An Ghaeltacht who subsequently represented Kerry in the 2025 Munster Intermediate Club Football Championship and will compete in the Kerry Senior Club Football Championship for 2026.

== Format ==
The 16 clubs were drawn into four groups of 4 teams each. Each team is to play the other three teams in their group once, having one home match, one away match and one at a neutral venue. The top two teams from each group will advance to the quarter-finals with each group winner playing the runner-up of another group at home.

The winners of the championship will be promoted to the 2026 Kerry Club Football Championship and will represent Kerry in the 2025 Munster Intermediate Club Football Championship. There will be no relegation to the Junior Premier Championship in 2025. This is to facilitate an increase in the number of teams competing in the Senior Club Championship in 2026.

== Teams ==
Austin Stacks were promoted to the Kerry Club Football Championship for 2025 and were replaced by Firies who won the 2024 Junior Premier Championship.

Team	Location	Club's Divisional Side	In championship since	Championship titles	Last championship title
An Ghaeltacht	Gallarus	West Kerry	2019	3	2017
Ballydonoghue	Lisselton	Shannon Rangers	2021	0	—
Beaufort	Beaufort	Mid Kerry	2019	2	2000
Castleisland Desmonds	Castleisland	St Kieran's	2004	3	1981
Firies	Farranfore	East Kerry	2025	0	—
Fossa	Fossa	East Kerry	2023	0	—
Glenbeigh/Glencar	Glenbeigh	Mid Kerry	2017	0	—
Glenflesk	Glenflesk	East Kerry	2004	0	—
Gneeveguilla	Gneeveguilla	East Kerry	2022	1	2010
John Mitchels	Tralee	St Brendan's	2009	0	—
Kerins O'Rahilly's	Tralee	St Brendan's	2024	0	—
Kilcummin	Kilcummin	East Kerry	2021	2	2018
Killarney Legion	Killarney	East Kerry	2022	1	2005
Laune Rangers	Killorglin	Mid Kerry	2016	0	—
Listowel Emmets	Listowel	Feale Rangers	2024	1	2002
St. Mary's	Cahersiveen	South Kerry	2011	2	2015

== Group stage ==
=== Group 1 ===
Pos	Team	Pld	W	D	L	Diff	Pts	Qualification
1	Kilcummin	3	3	0	0	+25	6	Advance to Quarter-finals
2	Fossa	3	2	0	1	+9	4	Advance to Quarter-finals
3	Firies	3	1	0	2	-6	2	
4	John Mitchels	3	0	0	3	-28	0	

Source: Kerry GAA Fixtures/Results/Tables

Round 1

2 August 2025 Round 1	Firies	0–14 (14) – (21) 1–18	Kilcummin	Fitzgerald Stadium
19:00 IST (UTC+1)		(HT: 0–09 – 0–12)
	Pts: J Horgan 8 (3fs, 1tp), D O'Mahony, S Palmer 2 each, P de Brún, M Daly 1 each	Report	Gls: K Gorman 1 Pts: M O'Shea 6 (1tp, 1f), P O'Shea 4 (2fs), B Kealy 2 (tpf), C Foley 2, P O'Leary, P Moynihan, M Keane, S O'Leary 1 each	Referee: E Moran (Ballydonoghue)

9 August 2025 Round 1	Fossa	2–19 (25) – (14) 1–11	John Mitchels	Austin Stack Park
19:00 IST (UTC+1)		(HT: 1–13 - 1–04)
	Gls: M Rennie, D Clifford 1 each Pts: D Clifford 8 (1f), T O'Gorman 5, E O'Shea 3, C O'Shea, K Buckley, F Coffey 1 each	Report	Gls: C Holden 1 Pts: S Broderick 3 (1tpf, 1 '45), C Hurley 2 (1tp), M Kelliher 2 (1f), J Carmody 2, D Cunnane, P White 1 each	Referee: P Curtin (Brosna)

Round 2

16 August 2025 Round 2	John Mitchels	0–10 (10) – (16) 0–16	Kilcummin	Ballyseedy
18:30 IST (UTC+1)		(HT: 0–06 - 0–07)
		Report		Referee: B O'Shea (Keel)

16 August 2025 Round 2	Fossa	4–16 (28) – (18) 0–18	Firies	Fossa
19:00 IST (UTC+1)		(HT: 1–09 - 0–10)
	Gls: E O'Shea 2, T O'Gorman, M Rennie 1 each Pts: D Clifford 9 (2tpf, 2tp), E O'Shea 6 (2tp, 1f), T O'Gorman 1	Report	Pts: J Horgan 6 (4fs), D O'Mahony 4, S Palmer 3, J Flynn 2 (1tp), Darragh Brosnan 2, C Doe 1	Referee: S Joy (Laune Rangers)

Round 3

23 August 2025 Round 3	Firies	3–15 (24) – (13) 2–07	John Mitchels	Farranfore
18:30 IST (UTC+1)		(HT: 2–06 - 0–03)
				Referee: J Murphy

24 August 2025 Round 3	Kilcummin	0–22 (22) – (10) 0–10	Fossa	Kilcummin
13:00 IST (UTC+1)		(HT: 0–07 - 0–08)
				Referee: P Hayes (Kerins O'Rahilly's)

=== Group 2 ===
Pos	Team	Pld	W	D	L	Diff	Pts	Qualification
1	Killarney Legion	3	2	0	1	+1	4	Advance to Quarter-finals
2	Listowel Emmets	3	1	1	1	+7	3	Advance to Quarter-finals
3	Laune Rangers	3	1	1	1	-3	3	
4	Ballydonoghue	3	0	2	1	-5	2	

Source: Kerry GAA Fixtures/Results/Tables

Round 1

9 August 2025 Round 1	Laune Rangers	2–15 (21) – (16) 1–13	Killarney Legion	Austin Stack Park
17:00 IST (UTC+1)		(HT: 2–08 - 1–06)
	Gls: C O'Sullivan, J Tyther 1 each Pts: G Hassett 4 (1 '45), S Gannon 3, J Tyther 2 (2fs), O Bermingham, D Clifford, P Daly, D Cleary, M Leslie 1 each	Report	Gls: Denis Sheahan 1 Pts: D O'Sullivan 5 (1p, 4fs), B Kelly 3 (1tpf, 1 '45), R O'Grady 3 (1f), Cian Gammell, Danny Sheahan 1 each	Referee: S Mulvihill (St. Senan's)

10 August 2025 Round 1	Listowel Emmets	1–15 (18) – (18) 1–15	Ballydonoghue	Moyvane
14:00 IST (UTC+1)		(HT: 1–07 - 0–11)
	Gls: A Carey 1 Pts: S Tarrant 4 (1tp), D Lynch 3 (3fs), JJ Grimes 2 (1tp), A Carey 2, P Walsh, A Kennelly, B Sweeney, S Kissane 1 each	Report	Gls: K Lynch 1 Pts: J Kennelly 8 (2tpf, 4fs), P Kennelly 4 (1tp), Jason Foley 2, Jack Foley 1	Referee: F Clifford (Listry)

Round 2

17 August 2025 Round 2	Laune Rangers	1-10 (13) – (13) 0-13	Ballydonoghue	Killorglin
15:30 IST (UTC+1)		(HT: 0–05 - 0–06)
		Report		Referee: M Murphy (St. Michael's/Foilmore)

17 August 2025 Round 2	Killarney Legion	0–16 (16) – (15) 2-09	Listowel Emmets	Dirreen
15:00 IST (UTC+1)		(HT: 0–07 - 0–05)
	Pts: D O'Sullivan 6 (3fs),R O'Grady 5 (2fs), B Kelly 2 (1tpf), E O'Sullivan 2, D Lyne 1	Report	Gls: E Healy, S Keane 1 each Pts: D Lynch 3 (3fs), S Tarrant 2 (2fs), JJ Grimes 2 (1tp), E Healy, A Carey 1 each	Referee: G Kelliher (Beaufort)

Round 3

23 August 2025 Round 3	Ballydonoghue	0–09 (9) – (14) 0–14	Killarney Legion	Coolard
14:00 IST (UTC+1)		(HT: 0–02 - 0–06)
	Pts: J Kennelly 2 (2fs), D Sheehy 2 (1f, 1'45), Jack Foley 2 (1f), B Mason, Jason Foley, S Foley 1 each	Report	Pts: R O'Grady 3 (1f), F Murphy 3, P McCarthy, D O'Sullivan 2 each, E O'Sullivan, C Gammell, J Alade, J O'Donoghue 1 each	Referee: E Moriarty (Dingle)

23 August 2025 Round 3	Listowel Emmets	1-23 (26) – (18) 1-15	Laune Rangers	Listowel
14:00 IST (UTC+1)		(HT: 1–14 - 0–07)
	Gls: S Keane 1 Pts: S Keane 8 (2tpf, 2fs), A Kennelly, S Tarrant 3 (1tp) each, E Healy 3, P Walsh 2, E Browne, JJ Grimes, J McVeigh, C Sweeney 1 each	Report	Gls: G Hassett 1 Pts: J Tyther 4 (1tpf, 1f), E Hassett 3 (1f), P Carey 2 (1tp), E Clifford 2, C O'Sullivan, D Clifford, D Cleary, S Gannon 1 each	Referee: E Horan (Glenflesk)

=== Group 3 ===
Pos	Team	Pld	W	D	L	Diff	Pts	Qualification
1	An Ghaeltacht	3	2	1	0	+12	5	Advance to Quarter-finals
2	Glenflesk	3	2	0	1	+2	4	Advance to Quarter-finals
3	St. Mary's	3	1	0	2	-7	2	
4	Castleisland Desmonds	3	0	1	2	-7	1	

Source: Kerry GAA Fixtures/Results/Tables

Round 1

9 August 2025 Round 1	An Ghaeltacht	0–13 (13) – (13) 0–13	Castleisland Desmonds	Strand Road
19:00 IST (UTC+1)		(HT: 0–08 - 0–04)
		Report		Referee: P Hayes (Kerins O'Rahilly's)

9 August 2025 Round 1	St. Mary's	0–15 (15) – (16) 0–16	Glenflesk	Glenbeigh
19:00 IST (UTC+1)		(HT: 0–09 - 0–09)
		Report		Referee: G Kelliher (Beaufort)

Round 2

17 August 2025 Round 2	An Ghaeltacht	2-18 (24) – (15) 0-15	St. Mary's	Gallarus
13:30 IST (UTC+1)		(HT: 1-12 - 0-09)
		Report		Referee: P Curtin (Brosna)

17 August 2025 Round 2	Castleisland Desmonds	3-11 (20) – (24) 1-21	Glenflesk	Castleisland
16:00 IST (UTC+1)		(HT: 0-15 - 2-07)
	Gls: A O'Donoghue 2 (1p), PJ Curtin 1 Pts: A O'Donoghue 4 (1f, 1tp), M Hickey 2 (2fs), CH O'Connor 2 (1tp), L Brosnan, I Brosnan, PJ Curtin 1 each	Report	Gls: T Bowler 1 Pts: T Bowler 8 (3tp, 1tpf), D Roche 5 (3fs), L Crowley 5 (1tp), I Roche, D Roche, J O'Donoghue 1 each	Referee: JM Fitzgerald (Abbeydorney)

Round 3

23 August 2025 Round 3	St. Mary's	1-22 (25) – (22) 2-16	Castleisland Desmonds	Cahersiveen
18:30 IST (UTC+1)		(HT: 1–06 - 1–11)
				Referee: B Griffin (Clounmacon)

23 August 2025 Round 3	Glenflesk	1-15 (18) – (21) 2-15	An Ghaeltacht	Glenflesk
18:30 IST (UTC+1)		(HT: 1-05 - 1-06)
				Referee: G Kissane (Kerins O'Rahilly's)

=== Group 4 ===
Pos	Team	Pld	W	D	L	Diff	Pts	Qualification
1	Beaufort	3	3	0	0	+25	6	Advance to Quarter-finals
2	Gneeveguilla	3	2	0	1	+19	4	Advance to Quarter-finals
3	Kerins O'Rahilly's	3	1	0	2	-29	2	
4	Glenbeigh/Glencar	3	0	0	3	-15	0	

Source: Kerry GAA Fixtures/Results/Tables

Round 1

10 August 2025 Round 1	Glenbeigh/Glencar	1–15 (18) – (20) 1–17	Kerins O'Rahilly's	Fitzgerald Stadium
14:00 IST (UTC+1)		(HT: 0–04 - 0–08)
		Report		Referee: E Walsh (Rathmore)

10 August 2025 Round 1	Beaufort	0–20 (20) – (11) 0–11	Gneeveguilla	Fitzgerald Stadium
16:00 IST (UTC+1)		(HT: 0–09 - 0–07)
		Report		Referee: JM Fitzgerald (Abbeydorney)

Round 2

16 August 2025 Round 2	Kerins O'Rahilly's	0–12 (12) – (31) 5–16	Gneeveguilla	Strand Road
16:00 IST (UTC+1)		(HT: 0–05 - 2–09)
	Pts: J Savage 7 (1tpf, 2fs), D O'Connor 2 (2fs), J Foley 2 (1tp), G Savage 1 (1f)	Report	Gls: P Doyle 2, Paudie O'Leary, S O'Keeffe, J Cremin 1 each Pts: P Doyle 4, J O'Leary 3 (1f), S O'Keeffe 2, P Brosnan, Paul O'Leary, Paudie O'Leary, D O'Leary, C Buckley, J Cremin, P Finnegan 1 each	Referee: P Dowling (Ballylongford)

16 August 2025 Round 2	Glenbeigh/Glencar	3–09 (18) – (22) 1–19	Beaufort	Glenbeigh
17:00 IST (UTC+1)		(HT: 1-06 - 0–10)
	Gls: F O'Sullivan, C Teahan, T Cahill 1 each Pts: C Teahan 6 (3fs, 1tp), L Smith 2 (1tp), F O'Sullivan 1	Report	Gls: L Carey 1 Pts: F Hallissey 5 (2fs, 1tp), J O'Connor 5 (2fs, 1'45), D O'Connor 4, L Carey 3, N Breen, D Dennehy 1 each	Referee: B Griffin (Clounmacon)

Round 3

24 August 2025 Round 3	Beaufort	3–18 (27) – (15) 0–15	Kerins O'Rahilly's	Beaufort
16:00 IST (UTC+1)		(HT: 0-10 - 0–12)
	Gls: L Carey, J O'Connor, D Dennehy 1 each Pts: J O'Connor 6 (1tpf), L Carey 5, F Hallissey 3 (3fs), N Breen 2, S O'Brien, D Dennehy 1 each	Report	Pts: D O'Connor 6 (1tp), T Kennedy 5 (2tp), G Dillane 2 (1tp), J Savage 2 (1f)	Referee: P O'Sullivan (Firies)

24 August 2025 Round 3	Gneeveguilla	2–18 (24) – (15) 0–15	Glenbeigh/Glencar	Gneeveguilla
16:00 IST (UTC+1)		(HT: 2-09 - 0–08)
				Referee: E Moran (Ballydonoghue)

== Knockout stage ==
=== Quarter-finals ===
30 August 2025
16:00 IST (UTC+1)
Quarter-final

Report

Killarney Legion	1–21 (24) – (14) 0–14	Glenflesk
(HT: 0–11 - 0–06)
Gls: D Lyne 1 Pts: R O'Grady 8 (1tp, 1f), E O'Sullivan 4, J O'Donoghue 3, P McCarthy, F Murphy 2 each, C Gammell, D Lyne 1 each		Pts: D Roche 6, L Crowley 3 (1f), M Kelliher 2 (1tpf), K O'Sullivan 1

Dirreen
Referee: P Hayes (Kerins O'Rahilly's)

30 August 2025
18:00 IST (UTC+1)
Quarter-final

Report

Kilcummin	1–14 (17) – (16) 0–16	Listowel Emmets
(HT: 1–08 - 0–07)
Gls: M O'Shea 1 Pts: P O'Shea 4 (1tpf, 1f), C Foley 4 (1tpf), P O'Leary 2 (1tp), M Keane 2 (1f), S O'Leary, S McSweeney 1 each		Pts: JJ Grimes 4 (1tpf), S Keane 3 (1tpf), S Tarrant 2 (2fs), D Lynch 2 (1f), E Healy, D Leahy, C Sweeney, B Sweeney, A Carey 1 each

Kilcummin
Referee: S Joy (Laune Rangers)

31 August 2025
15:00 IST (UTC+1)
Quarter-final

Report

An Ghaeltacht	0–21 (21) – (19) 1–16	Gneeveguilla
(HT: 0–08 - 0–15)
Pts: É Ó Conchúir 7 (1p, 1tp, 1tpf, 1f), C Ó Beaglaoich 4 (2tp), R Ó Beaglaoich 2 (2fs), PJ Mac Láimh , T Ó Sé DC 2 each, B Ó Beaglaoich, P Ó Sé, C Mac Gearailt, C Ó Corrduibh 1 each		Gls: P O'Connor 1 Pts: J O'Leary 8 (2tpf, 2fs, 1'45), P O'Connor 3 (1tp), D O'Leary, C Buckley 2 (1tp) each, P Finnegan 1

Gallarus
Referee: B O'Shea (Keel)

31 August 2025
16:00 IST (UTC+1)
Quarter-final

Report

Beaufort	0–15 (15) – (17) 2–11	Fossa
(HT: 0–11 - 0–05)
Pts: F Hallissey 6 (4fs, 1'45), J O'Connor 3 (2fs), L Carey 3 (1tp), D O'Connor 2 (1tp), M Breen 1		Gls: P Clifford 2 Pts: D Clifford 5 (2fs), P Clifford 4 (1tp), E O'Shea 2 (1f)

Beaufort
Referee: S Mulvihill (St. Senan's)

=== Semi-finals ===
7 September 2025
13:30 IST (UTC+1)
Semi-final

Report

Kilcummin	0–20 (20) – (23) 3–14	Fossa
(HT: 0–04 - 0–10)
Pts: P O'Shea 7 (2tp, 1f), M O'Shea 4 (2tp), C Foley 4 (1tp), P O'Leary 4, K O'Shea 1		Gls: P Sheahan, D Clifford, E O'Shea 1 each Pts: D Clifford 5 (1tp, 1tpf), E O'Shea 4 (1f), P Clifford 3 (1'45), P Sheahan, T O'Gorman 1 each

Austin Stack Park
Referee: P Hayes (Kerins O'Rahilly's)

7 September 2025
16:00 IST (UTC+1)
Semi-final

Report

An Ghaeltacht	2–16 (22) – (20) 2–14	Killarney Legion
(HT: 1–09 - 0–06)
Gls: É Ó Conchúir, R Ó Beaglaoich 1 each Pts: C Ó Beaglaoich 5 (2tp), R Ó Beaglaoich 5 (1tpf, 2fs),PJ MacLáimh 3, B Ó Beaglaoich 2, C Ó Riagáin 1		Gls: J O'Donoghue, J Bowler 1 each Pts: D O'Sullivan 4 (4fs),R O'Grady 4 (1tpf, 1f), E O'Sullivan, C Gammell 2 (1tp) each, D Lyne, J O'Donoghue 1 each

Milltown
Referee: É Moran (Ballydonoghue)

=== Final ===
14 September 2025
13:00 IST (UTC+1)
Final

Report

Fossa	1–11 (14) – (19) 0–19	An Ghaeltacht
(HT: 1–04 - 0–14)
Gls: E O'Shea 1 (f); Pts: D Clifford 7 (2tp, 1f), E O'Shea 3 (3fs), M Rennie 1		Pts: B Ó Beaglaoich 9 (4tp), É Ó Conchúir 3 (1tp), R Ó Beaglaoich 2 (2fs), C Ó Corrduibh, A Ó Beaglaoich 2 each, C Ó Beaglaoich 1

Austin Stack Park
Referee: P Hayes (Kerins O'Rahilly's)

== See also ==
- 2025 Kerry Club Football Championship
- 2025 Kerry Senior Football Championship
