= Kerry Intermediate Football Championship =

Annual Gaelic football competition

Fenian Cup
- Current season or competition: 2026 Kerry Intermediate Football Championship
- Irish: Corn Fíníneach
- Code: Gaelic football
- Founded: 1931
- Region: Kerry (GAA)
- Trophy: Fenian Cup
- No. of teams: 16
- Title holders: Fossa (1st title)
- Most titles: Kenmare Shamrocks, Milltown/Castlemaine (5 titles)
- Sponsors: Kerry Petroleum
- Official website: kerrygaa.ie

The Kerry Intermediate Football Championship is an annual Gaelic football competition contested by mid-tier Kerry GAA clubs.

An Ghaeltacht are the title holders, having defeated Fossa 0–19 to 1–11 in the 2025 final.

== History ==
The competition was revived in 1959, and District Boards had the right to enter teams.

Kerry senior players play in the Kerry Intermediate Football Championship. 2014 All-Ireland winner Peter Crowley had a season-ending cruciate injury from playing for Laune Rangers in it in 2019 and missed the 2019 All-Ireland Senior Football Championship as a result. 2021 winners Na Gaeil boasted ex-Australian Football League professional Stefan Okunbor, Diarmuid O'Connor and brothers Jack and Andrew Barry in their ranks.

=== Honours ===
The winners can be promoted to play in the Kerry Club Football Championship in the year after they win this competition.

The winners of the Kerry Intermediate Football Championship progress to the Munster Intermediate Club Football Championship, representing Kerry, later that year, or, as was the case in 2021, the following year. They often do well there and recent winners include Templenoe in 2019 and Na Gaeil winning in 2022 after winning the Kerry Intermediate Football Championship in 2021. Kilcummin made it 12 wins for Kerry out of 13 in 2018. The winners can then go on and win the All-Ireland Intermediate Club Football Championship title like Milltown/Castlemaine did in 2012.

Teams beaten in the first round take part in the Intermediate Football Shield. The winners collect the Fenian Cup.

== Format ==
=== Group stage ===
The 16 clubs are divided into four groups of four. Over the course of the group stage, each team plays once against the others in the group, resulting in each team being guaranteed three group games. Two points are awarded for a win, one for a draw and zero for a loss. The teams are ranked in the group stage table by points gained, then scoring difference and then their head-to-head record. The top two teams in each group qualify for the quarter-finals and the bottom team in each group advance to the relegation playoffs.

=== Knockout stage ===
Quarter-finals: The 4 group winners and 4 group runners-up contest this round. A group winner will play a group runner-up of another group. The two winners from these two games advance to the semi-finals.

Semi-finals: The four quarter-final winners contest this round. The two winners from these two games advance to the final.

Final: The two semi-final winners contest the final. The winning team are declared champions and are promoted to the Kerry Senior Football Championship.

=== Relegation playoffs ===
Relegation semi-finals: The 4 group losers contest this round. The two losers from these two games advance to the relegation finals.

Relegation finals: The two semi-final losers contest the relegation final. The losing team are relegated to the Kerry Premier Junior Football Championship.

=== Qualification ===
At the end of the championship, the winning club qualify to the subsequent Munster Intermediate Club Football Championship.

== Teams ==
=== 2026 Teams ===
Team	Location	Colours	Division	In championship since	Championship titles	Last championship title
Ballydonoghue	Lisselton	Green and White	Shannon Rangers	2021	0	—
Ballymacelligott	Ballymacelligott	Blue and yellow	St Kieran's	2026	0	—
Beaufort	Beaufort	Blue and yellow	Mid Kerry	2019	2	2000
Castleisland Desmonds	Castleisland	White and blue	St Kieran's	2004	3	1981
Firies	Firies	Blue and navy	East Kerry	2025	0	—
Fossa	Fossa	Red and black	East Kerry	2023	0	—
Glenbeigh-Glencar	Glenbeigh	Red and black	Mid Kerry	2017	0	—
Glenfesk	Glenflesk	Blue and yellow	East Kerry	2004	0	—
Gneeveguilla	Gneeveguilla	Yellow and green	East Kerry	2022	1	2010
John Mitchels	Tralee	Green and yellow	Tralee	2009	0	—
Kerins O'Rahilly's	Tralee	Blue and white	Tralee	2024	0	—
Kilcummin	Kilcummin	Red and green	East Kerry	2021	2	2018
Killarney Legion	Killarney	Green and white	East Kerry	2022	1	2005
Laune Rangers	Killorglin	Blue and white	Mid Kerry	2016	0	—
Listowel Emmets	Listowel	Black and amber	Feale Rangers	2024	1	2002
St. Mary’s	Cahersiveen	White and blue	South Kerry	—	2	2015

== List of finals ==
=== Legend ===
- Gold – All-Ireland intermediate club champions
- Silver – All-Ireland intermediate club runners-up

=== List of Kerry IFC finals ===
Year	Winners		Runners-up		#
Year	Club	Score	Club	Score	#
2026	Fossa	0-26	Kilcummin	0-22	
2025	An Ghaeltacht	0-19	Fossa	1-11	
2024	Austin Stacks	(0-12) 1-14 R	Laune Rangers	(2-06) 0-05 R	
2023	Milltown/Castlemaine	2-13	Fossa	0-18	
2022	Rathmore	1-13	An Ghaeltacht	0-14	
2021	Na Gaeil	0-13	Beaufort	1-07	
2020	Spa	4-18	Beaufort	1-19	
2019	Templenoe	2-14	An Ghaeltacht	0-12	
2018	Kilcummin	3-05	Glenflesk	1-08	
2017	An Ghaeltacht	1-12	Templenoe	0-14	
2016	Kenmare Shamrocks	2-11	Templenoe	1-06	
2015	St Mary's	1-13	Spa	0-13	
2014	Ardfert	1-12	Spa	0-10	
2013	Currow	2-11	St Mary's	0-14	
2012	Finuge	1-12	Spa	0-12	
2011	Milltown/Castlemaine	3-09	Waterville	1-06	
2010	Gneeveguilla	1-06	Finuge	1-05	
2009	Spa	1-12	Currow	0-07	
2008	St Michael's/Foilmore	1-09	Gneeveguilla	0-10	
2007	Annascaul	0-10	Listowel Emmets	0-06	
2006	Ardfert	3-07	Annascaul	0-10	
2005	Legion	0-08	Finuge	0-06	
2004	Dingle	1-11	Annascaul	0-10	
2003	Milltown/Castlemaine	1-07	Waterville	0-05	
2002	Listowel Emmets	1-12	Dingle	0-09	
2001	St Mary's	1-17	Ballymacelligott	1-09	
2000	Beaufort	2-07	Ballymacelligott	1-02	
1999	Rathmore	0-15	Glenflesk	0-09	
1998	An Ghaeltacht	2-14	Dingle	0-04	
1997	Kilcummin		Currow		
1996	Dingle	2-12	Milltown/Castlemaine	2-10	
1995	Valentia	3-10	Spa	0-08	
1994	Milltown/Castlemaine		An Ghaeltacht		
1993	Waterville		Milltown/Castlemaine		
1992	Annascaul		St Mary's		
1991	Milltown/Castlemaine		Kenmare Shamrocks		
1990	Kenmare Shamrocks				
1989	Dingle	2-09	Kenmare Shamrocks	1-10	
1988	Dingle	1-09	Templenoe	0-10	
1987	Annascaul	1-10	Spa	1-07	
1986	Valentia	1-10	Annascaul	1-07	
1985	Dr Crokes	0-13	Moyvane	0-06	
1984	Beale	2-05	Moyvane	1-06	
1983	No championship				
1982	Annascaul	2-03	Beale	1-05	
1981	Castleisland Desmonds				
1980	Beaufort	5-04	Dingle	0-08	
1979	Castleisland Desmonds				
1978	Castleisland Desmonds				
1977	Tarbert	2-07	Keel	2-03	
1976	Ballylongford	1-09	Tarbert	0-04	
1975	Castlegregory		Tarbert		
1974	Spa	0-11	Waterville	1-06	
1973	No championship				
1972	Ballylongford	5-09	Kenmare Shamrocks	0-06	
1971	Ballylongford		Dr Crokes		
1970	Kenmare Shamrocks	2-15	Ballylongford	2-05	
1969	Keel	0-07	Tarbert	0-04	
1968	Kenmare Shamrocks	1-07	Finuge	0-06	
1960–1967	No championship				
1959	Castleisland District	1-10	East Kerry	0-02	
1949	North Kerry		Kenmare District		
1944–1948	No championship				
1943	Army Ballymullen Barracks	1-07	Currow	1-01	
1942	Castlegregory	3-08	Kenmare District	2-02	
1941	No championship				
1940	Kenmare Shamrocks	3-06	Listry	1-08	
1934–1939	No championship				
1933	An Ghaeltacht	0-05	South Kerry	0-01	
1932	North Kerry	3-02	South Kerry	2-04	
1931	North Kerry	0-08	South Kerry	1-03	

== Roll of honour ==
=== By club ===
#	Team	Titles	Runners-Up	Championships won	Championships runner-up
1	Kenmare Shamrocks	5	3	1940, 1968, 1970, 1990, 2016	1972, 1989, 1991
1	Milltown/Castlemaine	5	2	1991, 1994, 2003, 2011, 2023	1993, 1996
3	Dingle	4	3	1988, 1989, 1996, 2004	1980, 1998, 2002
3	Annascaul	4	3	1982, 1987, 1992, 2007	1986, 2004, 2006
3	An Ghaeltacht	4	3	1933, 1998, 2017, 2025	1994, 2019, 2022
6	Spa	3	5	1974, 2009, 2020	1987, 1995, 2012, 2014, 2015
6	Ballylongford	3	1	1971, 1972, 1976	1970
6	North Kerry	3	0	1931, 1932, 1949	—
6	Castleisland Desmonds	3	0	1978, 1979, 1981	—
10	Beaufort	2	2	1980, 2000	2020, 2021
10	St Mary's	2	2	2001, 2015	1992, 2013
10	Kilcummin	2	1	1997, 2018	2026
10	Castlegregory	2	0	1942, 1975	—
10	Valentia Young Islanders	2	0	1986, 1995	—
10	Ardfert	2	0	2006, 2014	—
10	Rathmore	2	0	1999, 2022	—
17	Tarbert	1	3	1977	1969, 1975, 1976
17	Waterville	1	3	1993	1974, 2003, 2011
17	Finuge	1	3	2012	1968, 2005, 2010
17	Currow	1	3	2013	1943, 1997, 2009
17	Templenoe	1	3	2019	1988, 2016, 2017
17	Fossa	1	2	2026	2023, 2025
17	Keel	1	1	1969	1977
17	Beale	1	1	1984	1982
17	Dr Crokes	1	1	1985	1971
17	Listowel Emmets	1	1	2002	2007
17	Gneeveguilla	1	1	2010	2008
17	Army Ballymullen Barracks	1	0	1943	—
17	Castleisland District	1	0	1959	—
17	Killarney Legion	1	0	2005	—
17	St Michael's/Foilmore	1	0	2008	—
17	Na Gaeil	1	0	2021	—
17	Austin Stacks	1	0	2024	—
33	South Kerry	0	3	—	1931, 1932, 1933
33	Kenmare District	0	2	—	1942, 1949
33	Moyvane	0	2	—	1984, 1985
33	Ballymacelligott	0	2	—	2000, 2001
33	Glenflesk	0	2	—	1999, 2018
33	Listry	0	1	—	1940
33	East Kerry	0	1	—	1959
33	Laune Rangers	0	1	—	2024

=== By division ===
Division	Titles	Runners-Up	Total
West Kerry	14	9	23
East Kerry	11	14	25
Mid Kerry	8	7	15
Kenmare District	6	8	14
South Kerry	6	8	14
Shannon Rangers	5	5	10
St Kieran's	5	5	10
St Brendan's Board	5	0	5
North Kerry	3	0	3
Feale Rangers	2	6	8
Tralee District	1	0	1

== Records and statistics ==
=== By decade ===
The most successful team of each decade, judged by number of Kerry Intermediate Football Championship titles, is as follows:

- 1930s: 2 for North Kerry (1931, 1932)
- 1940s: 1 each for Kenmare Shamrocks (1940), Castlegregory (1942), Army Ballymullen Barracks (1943) and North Kerry (1949)
- 1950s: 1 for Castleisland District (1959)
- 1960s: 1 each for Kenmare Shamrocks (1968) and Keel (1969)
- 1970s: 3 for Ballylongford (1971, 1972, 1976)
- 1980s: 2 each for Annascaul (1982, 1987) and Dingle (1988, 1989)
- 1990s: 2 for Milltown/Castlemaine (1991, 1994)
- 2000s: 1 each for ten clubs (2000–2009)
- 2010s: 1 each for ten clubs (2010–2019)
- 2020s: 1 each for five clubs (2020–2024)

== See also ==
- Kerry Senior Football Championship (Tier 1)
- Kerry Club Football Championship (Tier 1)
- Kerry Premier Junior Football Championship (Tier 3)
- Kerry Junior Football Championship (Tier 4)
- Kerry Novice Football Championship (Tier 5)
- Munster Intermediate Club Football Championship
- Kerry Intermediate Hurling Championship
