= 2023 Kerry Intermediate Football Championship =

Annual Gaelic football competition season

- Dates: 5 August – 19 November 2023
- Teams: 16
- Sponsor: Kerry Petroleum
- Champions: Milltown/Castlemaine (5th title); Cathal Moriarty (captain); Mark Bourke (manager)
- Runners-up: Fossa; Emmett O’Shea (captain); Adrian Sheehan (manager)
- Relegated: Currow

Tournament statistics
- Matches played: 34
- Goals scored: 81 (2.38 per match)
- Points scored: 834 (24.53 per match)

The 2023 Kerry Intermediate Football Championship (known as the Kerry Petroleum Intermediate Club Championship for sponsorship reasons) was the 2023 edition of the Kerry Intermediate Football Championship. The draw for the group stage pairings took place on 15 February 2023. The championship ran from 5 August to 19 November 2023 and was won by Milltown/Castlemaine.

== Team changes ==
=== To Championship ===
Promoted from the Kerry Premier Junior Football Championship

- Fossa

Relegated from the Kerry Senior Football Championship

- Austin Stacks

=== From Championship ===
Promoted to the Kerry Senior Football Championship

- Rathmore

Relegated to the Kerry Premier Junior Football Championship

- Dromid Pearses

== Group A ==
=== Group A table ===
Advance to knockout stage

Team	Matches				Score			Pts
Team	Pld	W	D	L	For	Against	Diff	Pts
Beaufort	3	1	2	0	51	43	8	4
Milltown/Castlemaine	3	1	1	1	35	42	-7	3
Gneeveguilla	3	1	1	1	52	43	9	3
Glenbeigh-Glencar	3	1	0	2	39	49	-10	2

=== Group A results ===
12 August 2023 Round 1	Milltown/Castlemaine	1-12 - 1-11	Gneeveguilla	Spa Grounds

13 August 2023 Round 1	Glenbeigh-Glencar	0-13 - 1-18	Beaufort	J. P. O'Sullivan Park
	G O'Grady 0-6, C Teahan 0-2, O O'Connor 0-1, L Roche 0-1, T Cahill 0-1, T Sheahan 0-1, K Courtney 0-1.		D O'Connor 0-6, F Hallissey 0-4, K Dennehy 0-4, C O'Sullivan 1-0, S O'Brien 0-3, R Murphy 0-1.

19 August 2023 Round 2	Glenbeigh-Glencar	2-11 - 0-09	Milltown/Castlemaine	Páirc na nGael

20 August 2023 Round 2	Beaufort	2-13 - 3-10	Gneeveguilla	Páirc Uí Chocláin

26 August 2023 Round 3	Milltown/Castlemaine	0-11 - 2-05	Beaufort	Páirc de Búrca

26 August 2023 Round 3	Gneeveguilla	3-10 - 0-09	Glenbeigh-Glencar	Gneeveguilla Grounds

== Group B ==
=== Group B table ===
Advance to knockout stage

Team	Matches				Score			Pts
Team	Pld	W	D	L	For	Against	Diff	Pts
Glenflesk	3	3	0	0	58	47	11	6
Fossa	3	2	0	1	54	47	7	4
An Ghaeltacht	3	1	0	2	39	43	-4	2
St Mary's	3	0	0	3	41	55	-14	0

=== Group B results ===
12 August 2023 Round 1	Fossa	0-15 - 1-07	An Ghaeltacht	Austin Stack Park
	D Clifford 0-7, E O'Shea 0-3, T O'Shea 0-2, C O'Shea 0-1, P Clifford 0-1, K Buckley 0-1.		D Ó Sé 1-1, C Ó Beaglaoich 0-3, R Ó Sé 0-1, G Ó Cinnéide 0-1, R Ó Beaglaoich 0-1.

12 August 2023 Round 1	St Mary's	1-10 - 2-15	Glenflesk	Páirc na nGael

20 August 2023 Round 2	An Ghaeltacht	1-11 - 1-13	Glenflesk	Gallaras Grounds

20 August 2023 Round 2	Fossa	1-16 - 2-10	St Mary's	Fossa Grounds

27 August 2023 Round 3	St Mary's	1-09 - 4-06	An Ghaeltacht	Con Keating Park

27 August 2023 Round 3	Glenflesk	4-12 - 0-20	Fossa	Glenflesk Grounds

== Group C ==
=== Group C table ===
Advance to knockout stage

Team	Matches				Score			Pts
Team	Pld	W	D	L	For	Against	Diff	Pts
Kilcummin	3	3	0	0	64	35	29	6
Killarney Legion	3	2	0	1	46	33	13	4
Laune Rangers	3	1	0	2	42	45	-3	2
Currow	3	0	0	3	34	73	-39	0

=== Group C results ===
5 August 2023 Round 1	Kilcummin	2-14 - 1-08	Laune Rangers	Páirc Uí Chocláin

13 August 2023 Round 1	Currow	0-08 - 1-20	Killarney Legion	Firies Grounds

19 August 2019 Round 2	Currow	2-09 - 4-19	Kilcummin	Currow Grounds

20 August 2023 Round 2	Killarney Legion	0-14 - 1-09	Laune Rangers	Legion Grounds

26 August 2023 Round 3	Laune Rangers	1-16 - 1-08	Currow	JP O'Sullivan Park

26 August 2023 Round 3	Kilcummin	0-13 - 0-09	Killarney Legion	Kilcummin Grounds

== Group D ==
=== Group D table ===
Advance to knockout stage

Team	Matches				Score			Pts
Team	Pld	W	D	L	For	Against	Diff	Pts
Castleisland Desmonds	3	3	0	0	45	29	16	6
Austin Stacks	3	2	0	1	51	40	11	4
John Mitchels	3	1	0	2	38	43	-5	2
Ballydonoghue	3	0	0	3	39	61	-22	0

=== Group D results ===
12 August 2023 Round 1	Ballydonoghue	1-08 - 2-18	Austin Stacks	Páirc Mhic Shithigh
	J Kennelly 1-4, D Sheehan 0-1, J Foley 0-1, P Kennelly 0-1,		S Quilter 0-9, D McKivergan 1-1, C Griffin 1-0, D Mannix 0-3, G Horan 0-2, E Carroll 0-1, M O'Donnell 0-1, C Browne 0-1.

12 August 2023 Round 1	John Mitchels	0-06 - 1-08	Castleisland Desmonds	Ballymacelligott Grounds

19 August 2023 Round 2	Ballydonoghue	0-12 - 1-14	Castleisland Desmonds	Ballydonoghue Grounds

20 August 2023 Round 2	Austin Stacks	2-10 - 1-09	John Mitchels	Connolly Park

27 August 2023 Round 3	John Mitchels	2-14 - 2-10	Ballydonoghue	John Mitchels Grounds

27 August 2023 Round 3	Castleisland Desmonds	2-11 - 1-08	Austin Stacks	Castleisland Grounds

== Relegation playoffs ==
=== Relegation semi-finals ===
2 September 2023 Semi-final	Currow	0-07 - 1-10	Glenbeigh-Glencar	Fossa Grounds

2 September 2023 Semi-final	Ballydonoghue	3-12 - 2-13	St Mary's	Páirc de Búrca

=== Relegation final ===
9 September 2023 Final	Currow	1-09 - 2-14	St Mary's	Páirc na nGael

== Knockout stage ==
=== Quarter-finals ===
2 September 2023 Quarter-final	Glenflesk	0-12 - 1-18	Austin Stacks	Glenflesk Grounds

3 September 2023 Quarter-final	Beaufort	0-11 - 0-13	Killarney Legion	Páirc Uí Chocláin

3 September 2023 Quarter-final	Kilcummin	0-14 - 0-18	Milltown/Castlemaine	Kilcummin Grounds

3 September 2023 Quarter-final	Castleisland Desmonds	1-19 - 5-17	Fossa	Castleisland Grounds

=== Semi-finals ===
10 September 2023 Semi-final	Milltown/Castlemaine	1-13 - 1-10	Killarney Legion	FitzGerald Stadium

10 September 2023 Semi-final	Austin Stacks	0-21 - 0-21; Penalties: 2-3	Fossa	FitzGerald Stadium
		Report

=== Final ===
19 November 2023 Final	Milltown/Castlemaine	2-13 - 0-18	Fossa	Austin Stack Park
	É O’Connor 0-8 (3 frees, 1 45), B Casey 2-1, J O’Sullivan 0-2, C Moriarty 0-1, G McKenna 0-1.	Report	D Clifford 0-12 (5 frees, 1 mark), E O’Shea 0-3 (1 free), P Clifford 0-2, H Buckley 0-1.
