= Keel GAA =

GAA club in Galmoy, County Kilkenny, Ireland

Keel
- An Chill
- Founded: 1889
- County: Kerry
- Colours
- Grounds: Keel GAA Grounds

Playing kits
Standard colours

Senior Club Championships
	All Ireland	Munster champions	Kerry champions
Football:	0	0	0

Keel GAA Club is a Gaelic Athletic Association club in Keel, County Kerry, Ireland. The club is affiliated to the Mid Kerry Board and the Kerry County Board and is solely concerned with the game of Gaelic football.

== History ==
Located in the village of Keel, about 5 km west of Castlemaine on the Dingle Peninsula, Keel GAA Club was founded in 1889. The club, known as Keel Geraldines in its early years, contested two Kerry SFC finals in three years, but lost out to Ballymacelligott in 1891 and Laune Rangers in 1893. In spite of these defeats, Keel have won eight Mid Kerry SFC titles between 1948 and 2009.

Keel has spent the majority of its existence operating in the lower grades of Gaelic football. One of the club's most notable successes came in 1969, when Keel beat Tarbert by 0–07 to 0–04 to win the Kerry IFC title. The club subsequently returned to the junior grade.

The 21st century saw Keel claim Kerry NFC titles in 2000 and 2003, as well as Kerry JFC titles in 2007 and 2013. The latter title was subsequently converted into a Munster Club JFC title, following a 0–14 to 0–04 win over Feohanagh/Castlemahon in the final. Keel's most recent success came in 2026, when the club beat Churchill by 0–14 to 0–12 to win the Kerry PJFC title.

== Honours ==
- Mid Kerry Senior Football Championship (8): 1948, 1957, 1959, 1960, 1968, 1971, 1981, 2009
- Kerry Intermediate Football Championship (1): 1969
- Munster Junior Club Football Championship (1): 2013
- Kerry Premier Junior Football Championship (1): 2026
- Kerry Junior Football Championship (2): 2007, 2013
- Kerry Novice Football Championship (2): 2000, 2003

== Notable players ==
- Tom Prendergast: All-Ireland SFC-winner (1969, 1970)
