= 1895 Kerry Senior Football Championship =

Gaelic football competition

- Dates: 11
- Champions: Ballymacelligott (3rd title)
- Runners-up: Cahersiveen

The 1895 Kerry Senior Football Championship was the seventh staging of the Kerry Senior Football Championship since its establishment by the Kerry County Board in 1889.

Ballymacelligott entered the championship as the defending champions.

The final was played between Ballymacelligott and Cahersiveen, in what was their first meeting in the final. Ballymacelligott won the match by 1–05 to 0–06 to claim their third championship title overall and a second title in succession.

== Results ==
=== Final ===
Final	Ballymacelligott	1-05 - 0-06	Cahersiveen
