= Maglass =

Maglass Magh Glas
- Townland
- Maglass shown within Ireland
- Coordinates: 52°14′48″N 09°32′45″W
- Country: Ireland
- County: County Kerry
- Barony: Trughanacmy
- Civil parish: Nohaval
- First recorded: Early 19th Century

Area
  - Total: 38 ha (93 acres)

Maglass (Irish: Magh Glas) is a townland in the parish of Ballymacelligott, which is situated between two towns, Tralee and Castleisland, County Kerry, Ireland. Ballymacelligott is the biggest parish in Munster. Maglass is a farming area, with the nearest shop and post office is approximately 1 mile from Maglass in Ballydwyer. The nearest church is a further mile in Clogher, where there is also a National School.

== Archaeology ==
The townland has an earthwork, 2 ringforts and a fulacht fiadh listed in the Archaeological Survey Database.

== See also ==
- List of townlands of County Kerry
