= Mike Breen (Gaelic footballer) =

Kerry Gaelic footballer

Personal information
- Born: 1998 (age 27–28) Tralee, County Kerry, Ireland
- Height: 5 ft 11 in (180 cm)

Sport
- Sport: Gaelic football
- Position: Midfield
Clubs
- Years: Club
- Beaufort → Mid Kerry
Club titles
- Kerry titles: 0
College
- Years: College
- MTU Kerry
College titles
- Sigerson titles: 0
Inter-county
- Years: County
- 2021–present: Kerry
Inter-county titles
- Munster titles: 2
- All-Irelands: 0
- NFL: 1
- All Stars: 0

Michael Breen (born 1998) is an Irish Gaelic footballer. At club level he plays with Beaufort, divisional side Mid Kerry and at inter-county level with the Kerry senior football team.

== Career ==
Breen first played Gaelic football at club level with Beaufort. He was part of the club's senior team that won four Mid Kerry SFC titles between 2016 and 2022. He lined out at centre-back when Beaufort beat Easkey to win the All-Ireland Club JFC title in 2019. Breen has also been called up to the Mid Kerry divisional team and lined out when they were beaten in finals by East Kerry in 2020 and 2022.

Breen first appeared on the inter-county scene with Kerry during a two year-stint with the minor team. He won consecutive All-Ireland MFC medals after defeats of Tipperary in 2015 and Galway in 2016. A season with the under-21 team yielded a Munster U20FC medal in 2018, before claiming an All-Ireland JFC medal in 2019.

After a number of years away from the inter-county scene, Breen was drafted onto the senior team during their Munster SFC-winning season in 2021. He missed the 2022 inter county season due to injury, before returning the following year and coming on as a substitute in Kerry's defeat by Dublin in the 2023 All-Ireland final.

== Honours ==
Beaufort

- Mid Kerry Senior Football Championship: 2016, 2017, 2021, 2022
- All-Ireland Junior Club Football Championship: 2019
- Munster Junior Club Football Championship: 2018

Kerry

- Munster Senior Football Championship: 2021, 2023
- National Football League: 2021
- All-Ireland Junior Football Championship: 2019
- Munster Junior Football Championship: 2019
- Munster Under-21 Football Championship: 2018
- All-Ireland Minor Football Championship: 2015, 2016
- Munster Minor Football Championship: 2015, 2016
