= 2013–14 All-Ireland Junior Club Football Championship =

- Sponsor: Allied Irish Bank
- Champions: Two Mile House (1st title); Niall Browne (captain); Jarlath Gilroy (manager)
- Runners-up: Fuerty; Niall Kilroy (captain); Malachy Gately (manager)

The 2013–14 All-Ireland Junior Club Football Championship was the 13th staging of the All-Ireland Junior Club Football Championship since its establishment by the Gaelic Athletic Association.

The All-Ireland final was played on 9 February 2014 at Croke Park in Dublin, between Two Mile House and Fuerty. Two Mile House won the match by 5–07 to 1–11 to claim their first ever championship title.

== All-Ireland Junior Club Football Championship ==
=== All-Ireland quarter-final ===
15 December 2013 Quarter-final	John Mitchels (Britain)	0-12 - 2-09	Emyvale (Monaghan)	Páirc na hÉireann
	M Molloy (0-5, 4f), D McConnell (0-2), C Murphy (0-1), C Owen, M Magee (0-1); C McGlade (0-1), P Murphy (0-1), A Murray (0-1).	Report	D McMahon (1-3, 0-2f)), M McAree (0-5f), D Colton (1-0), D Bellew (0-1);

=== All-Ireland semi-finals ===
26 January 2014 Semi-final	Two Mile House (Kildare)	0-13 - 2-06	Emyvale (Monaghan)	Pearse Park
	N Browne 0-5; C Healy 0-4 (1f), A Casey 0-3 (1f), S Darcy 0-1.		D McMahon 1-1 (0-1f), M McAree 1-1 (0-1f), D McAllister 0-3, R McAnespie 0-1.

1 February 20214 Semi-final	Fuerty (Roscommon)	0-10 - 0-09	Keel (Kerry)	Seán Finn Park
	G Ennis 0-6fs, N Kilroy 0-2 (1f), R Fallon, E Bannon 0-1 each.	Report	G Sayers 0-4 (1f), L Sheehan 0-3 (1f), T O Sullivan, M Burke 0-1 each.

=== All-Ireland final ===
9 February 2014 Final	Two Mile House (Kildare)	5-07 - 1-11	Fuerty (Roscommon)	Croke Park
	A Burke 2-2, M Sherry 2-0, C Healy 1-1 (pen), A Casey 0-3, C Julian 0-1 (f).	Report	R Fallon 1-2, N Kilroy 0-3, P Leahy 0-2, G Ennis 0-2 (1f), D Delaney, G Fallon 0-1 each.
