= 1894 Kerry Senior Football Championship =

Gaelic football competition

- Dates: 6
- Champions: Ballymacelligott (2nd title)
- Runners-up: Irremore

The 1894 Kerry Senior Football Championship was the sixth staging of the Kerry Senior Football Championship since its establishment by the Kerry County Board in 1889.

Laune Rangers entered the championship as the defending champions, however, they exited the championship after conceding a walkover to Ballymacelligott in the semi-finals.

Ballymacelligott were awarded the title without playing a single game, as Irremore conceded a walkover to them in the final. This was their second championship title overall and a first title in three years.

== Results ==
=== Final ===
Final	Ballymacelligott	w/o - scr.	Irremore

== Championship statistics ==
=== Miscellaneous ===
- Ballymacelligott win the title without playing a single game.
