= Edenburn =

Coordinates: 52.245°N 9.565°W

Edenburn House, formerly 'Magh House' or 'Rockfield', is a house and demesne in the parish of Ballymacelligott, County Kerry, in Ireland. Built in the late 18th century, it is situated between Tralee and Castleisland.

Formerly the home of the Hussey family, from 1937 to 1968, the house was used as a sanatorium for tuberculosis patients. Later becoming known as Edenburn Hospital, from 1968 until its closure in 1988 the building was a convalescent home and hospital, catering mostly for orthopaedic patients and elderly patients.
