= Ruairi O'Rahilly =

Irish Gaelic footballer

Ruairi O Rahilly
Personal information
- Native name: Ruairí Ó Raithile (Irish)
- Born: Ballymacelligott, County Kerry

Sport
- Sport: Gaelic football
- Position: Forward
Club
- Years: Club
- Ballymacelligott
Inter-county
- Years: County
- 1990's: Kerry
Inter-county titles
- Munster titles: 0
- All-Irelands: 0
- NFL: 0

Ruairi O'Rahilly was a footballer from County Kerry. He played football with Ballymacelligott and Kerry. He played with Kerry at all levels during the 1990s and early 2000s.

== Club ==
He played with his local Ballymacelligott club and the St Kieran's divisional side.

With St Kieran's he was a Runner-up in the 1996 Kerry Under-21 Football Championship and the 1998 Kerry Senior Football Championship.

== Underage ==
He first linked up with Kerry at minor level in 1992. He lined out in the Munster final but was on the losing side to Cork after a replay.

He was underage again in 1993. It was a short campaign however. Despite scoring four points two late Cork goals gave the Leesiders the win.

He joined the Under 21 side in 1996. He started the side first four games, including the Munster final win over Clare, but lost his place for the All-Ireland final with Cavan. He appeared as sub in a 1–17 to 2–10 win to pick up an All-Ireland U21 medal.

== Junior ==
He lined out with the Kerry Junior side in 1995. His only appearance being against Limerick.

He made another appearance in 1996, this time against Waterford.

He made his final apprentice at Junior level in 2001. Lining out in a surprise loss to Tipperary. This would be his final appearance with Kerry at any level.

== Senior ==
On the back of his displays at underage he joined the Kerry senior team during the 1996–97 National Football League. He made two appearances, including the semi-final win over Laois He played no part in the final win over Cork. He remained part of the panel for the championship as Kerry won the All-Ireland.

He made two more appearances during the 1997–98 National Football League. These would be his last at senior level.

== Sources ==
- http://munster.gaa.ie/winning-teams/u21f_teams/
- http://www.terracetalk.com/kerry-football/player/144/Ruairi-Rahilly
