= Aidan O'Sullivan =

Irish Gaelic footballer

Personal information
- Nickname: Shine
- Born: 1987 (age 38–39) Cahersiveen, County Kerry
- Height: 6 ft 0 in (183 cm)

Sport
- Sport: Gaelic football
- Position: Half back
Club
- Years: Club
- 200?-present: Dromid Pearses
Club titles
- Kerry titles: 3
Inter-county
- Years: County
- Kerry

Aidan Shine O'Sullivan (born 1987 in Cahersiveen, County Kerry) is an Irish sportsperson. He plays Gaelic football with his local club Dromid Pearses, his divisional side South Kerry and has been a member of the Kerry inter-county teams at all levels. He won an All Ireland Under 21 title in 2008.

He helped CIT GAA to a first Sigerson Cup in 2009.

At club level with the South Kerry divisional side he has won County championships at minor, Under 21 and senior level. With Dromid Pearses he has won county and Munster Junior championships.
