= 2022–23 All-Ireland Junior Club Football Championship =

- Dates: 22 October 2022 - 15 January 2023
- Teams: 33
- Sponsor: Allied Irish Bank
- Champions: Fossa (1st title); Paudie Clifford (captain); Adrian Sheehan (manager)
- Runners-up: Stewartstown Harps; Mark Rooney (captain); Blake Smyth (manager); Peter Armour (manager)

Tournament statistics
- Matches played: 32
- Goals scored: 66 (2.06 per match)
- Points scored: 691 (21.59 per match)
- Top scorer(s): Gareth Devlin (3-27)

The 2022–23 All-Ireland Junior Club Football Championship was the 21st staging of the All-Ireland Junior Club Football Championship since its establishment by the Gaelic Athletic Association for the 2001–02 season. The draws for the respective provincial championships took place at various stages between June and September 2022. The championship ran from 22 October 2022 to 15 January 2023.

The All-Ireland final was played on 15 January 2023 at Croke Park in Dublin, between Fossa from Kerry and Stewartstown Harps from Tyrone, in what was their first ever meeting in the final. Fossa won the match by 0-19 to 1-13 to claim their first ever championship title.

Gareth Devlin was the championship's top scorer with 3-27.

== Connacht Junior Club Football Championship ==
=== Connacht quarter-final ===
13 November 2022 Quarter-final	Clifden (Galway)	1-10 – 0-10	Carrigallen (Leitrim)	Galway
	G Gibbons 0-7, J O'Brien 1-0, E Moran 0-3.		A Skelly 0-3, M Dolan 0-3, C Kiernan 0-1, D Reilly 0-1, A Harte 0-1, C Kenny 0-1.	Stadium: Pearse Stadium; Referee: Ronan Hynes

=== Connacht semi-finals ===
12 November 2022 Semi-final	St. Ronan's (Roscommon)	1-12 – 0-09	Owenmore Gaels (Sligo)	Roscommon
	J Keavney 0-5, R Kelly 1-0, G O'Daly 0-2, E Killoran 0-1, T McManus 0-1, J Earley 0-1, J Glynn 0-1, F Guihen 0-1.		M Walsh 0-3, C Davey 0-2, G Anderson 0-2, O Geraghty 0-1, N O'Malley 0-1.	Stadium: Dr Hyde Park; Referee: S Corcoran

19 November 2022 Semi-final	Clifden (Galway)	1-10 – 0-11	Islandeady (Mayo)	Athenry
	G Gibbons 0-5, E Conneely 1-0, C Joyce 0-1, C Coneys 0-1, D Kennedy 0-1, J O'Brien 0-1, E Moran 0-1.		B Gibbons 0-4, D Gibbons 0-3, D Joyce 0-3, S Lally 0-1.	Stadium: Kenny Park; Referee: D Lyons Jr

=== Connacht final ===
3 December 2022 Final	St. Ronan's (Roscommon)	0-10 - 1-16	Clifden (Galway)	Roscommon
	J Keavney 0-5, A Benson 0-2, G O'Daly 0-2, L Killoran 0-1	Report	G Gibbons 0-6, E Conneely 1-1, J O'Brien 0-2, R King 0-2, S Sweeney 0-1, S Black 0-1, C Joyce 0-1, E Moran 0-1, C O'Donnell 0-1	Stadium: Dr Hyde Park; Referee: J Glavey

== Leinster Junior Club Football Championship ==
=== Leinster first round ===
22 October 2022 First round	St. Abban's, Adamstown (Wexford)	1-10 – 0-11	Stabannon Parnells (Louth)	Enniscorthy
	C Hickey 1-4, P Barden 0-3, R O'Brien 0-1, M Furlong 0-1, G O'Reilly 0-1.		H Butterly 0-8, D Crilly 0-2, S Reynolds 0-1.	Stadium: St. Patrick's Park; Referee: James Foley

22 October 2022 First round	Ballycommon (Offaly)	4-16 – 2-05	Erin's Own (Kilkenny)	Tullamore
	C Dunne 2-3, S Conneely 1-3, G Mann 0-5, S Conway 1-0, C Kenny 0-2, B Bracken 0-1, B Todd 0-1, TJ Bermingham 0-1.		S Daly 1-2, A Carron 1-0, L Carroll 0-1, J Holohan 0-1, K Holland 0-1.	Stadium: Bord na Móna O'Connor Park; Referee: Paddy McDermott

22 October 2022 First round	Laragh (Wicklow)	3-09 – 2-08	Amsterdam (Europe)	Baltinglass
	M Miley 2-0, J Nolan 0-5, A Olohan 1-0, P Merrigan 0-1, M Cullen 0-1, S Olohan 0-1.		C Kenny 0-4, M Rafferty 1-0, R Butler 1-0, P Thornton 0-3, S Strain 0-1.	Stadium: Baltinglass Grounds; Referee: Darren Delaney

22 October 2022 First round	Barrowhouse (Laois)	0-10 – 0-20	Straffan (Kildare)	Crettyard
	L Day 0-7, F Murphy 0-2, J Baldwin 0-1.		A Allen 0-5, R Kelly 0-5, B Tracey 0-3, S O'Connor 0-2, A Kiernan 0-2, J Tracey 0-2, K Calnan 0-1.	Stadium: Crettyard Grounds; Referee: Kieran Olwell

23 October 2022 First round	Clonmore (Carlow)	1-16 – 1-10	Grattan Óg (Longford)	Carlow
	S McGrath 0-7, S Murphy 1-0, B Lawler 0-2, J Hickey 0-2, T Pollard 0-1, A Byrne 0-1, R Bulmer 0-1, J Whelan 0-1, L Connolly 0-1.		J Hand 1-6, R Howlin 0-1, E Farrell 0-1, E Kinlan 0-1, G Hand 0-1.	Stadium: Netwatch Cullen Park; Referee: Kevin Williamson

=== Leinster quarter-finals ===
5 November 2022 Quarter-final	Clonmore (Carlow)	3-05 – 0-08	Straffan (Kildare)	Carlow
	J Hickey 1-0, E Connolly 1-0, C Murphy 1-0, S McGrath 0-2, E McGrath 0-1, K McDonald 0-1, L Connolly 0-1.		R Power 0-3, J Tracey 0-2, A Kelly 0-2, R Kelly 0-1.	Stadium: Netwatch Cullen Park; Referee: Enda Kelly

5 November 2022 Quarter-final	Ballycommon (Offaly)	1-06 – 2-06	Multyfarnham (Westmeath)	Tullamore
	A Mann 1-0, C Kenny 0-2, C Dunne, G Mann (f), TJ Bermingham and T Mealiffe 0-1 each.	Report	S Williams 1-2, S Sweeney 1-0 (pen), J Coffey 0-2 (2f), I McGovern (f) and R Wallace each.	Stadium: Bord na Móna O'Connor Park; Referee: David Fedigan

5 November 2022 Quarter-final	Laragh (Wicklow)	0-07 – 2-19	Castletown (Meath)	Aughrim
	J Nolan (0-4, 4f), D Miley (0-1); M Miley (0-1), M Cullen (0-1).	Report	K Ross (1-5, 2f, 1 45), D Cribbin (1-4), R McConnell (0-5, 3f), D Finney (0-3), A Matthews (0-1); K Price (0-1).	Stadium: Echelon Park; Referee: Kieran Harris

5 November 2022 Quarter-final	Garristown (Dublin)	1-08 – 2-07	St. Abban's, Adamstown (Wexford)	Balgriffin
	F Brooks (1-0), B O’Brien (0-3, 2 frees), C Galvin (0-2, 1 mark), J Gormley (0-1); R Tormey (0-1); S McManus (0-1)	Report	P Barden (1-1), C Hickey (0-4, 1 ’45, 1 free), D Kehoe (1-0), M Furlong (0-1), R O’Brien (0-1).	Stadium: Carrs Lane; Referee: Stephen Johnson

=== Leinster semi-finals ===
19 November 2022 Semi-final	Clonmore (Carlow)	0-07 – 0-10	Castletown (Meath)	Carlow
	S McGrath 0-4, C Murphy 0-2, T Pollard 0-1.		R McConnell 0-3, K Ross 0-2, D Cribbin 0-2, K Smyth 0-1, D Finney 0-1, D Ginnitty 0-1.	Stadium: Netwatch Cullen Park; Referee: K O'Brien

19 November 2022 Semi-final	Multyfarnham (Westmeath)	0-07 – 0-08 (aet)	St. Abban's, Adamstown (Wexford)	Mullingar
	S Williams 0-3, R Wallace 0-2, A Loughrey 0-1, E Feerick 0-1.		C Hickey 0-4, M Furlong 0-2, C Feeney 0-1, R O'Brien 0-1.	Stadium: TEG Cusack Park; Referee: C McCullough

=== Leinster final ===
3 December 2022 Final	St. Abban's, Adamstown (Wexford)	0-06 - 0-12	Castletown (Meath)	Chadwick's Wexford Park
	C Hickey 0-6 (2f)	Report	K Ross 0-6 (4f, 45), K Price 0-3, K Smyth 0-1 (1f), D Ginnitty 0-1, D Cribbin 0-1.	Referee: D Byrne

== Munster Junior Club Football Championship ==
=== Munster quarter-finals ===
12 November 2022 Quarter-final	Castlemahon (Limerick)	1-18 – 2-12	Shamrocks (Waterford)	Coolyroe
	S Flanagan (1-5, 0-3 frees), A Roche (0-8, 0-5 frees), J Kenny, J F Reidy (both 0-2), J Condon (0-1)		B Hynes (0-7, 0-5 frees), E Lonergan (1-1), P Hynes (1-1, 0-1 frees), K Crawford (0-2), A Crawford (0-1)	Stadium: Quaid Park; Referee: James O'Regan

12 November 2022 Quarter-final	Liscannor (Clare)	0-07 – 1-09	Thurles Sarsfields (Tipperary)	Milltown Malbay
	A Clohessy (0-3 2f), B Considine, P Haugh, G Duffy, D Nagle (0-1 apiece)		P Creedon (0-3), J Fogarty (1-0), L McCormack (0-2), K Bracken, S Butler, A Ryan, D Stakelum (0-1 apiece)	Stadium: Hennessy Memorial Park; Referee: Eoin Morrissey

=== Munster semi-finals ===
26 November 2022 Semi-final	Castlemahon (Limerick)	0-05 - 1-22	Fossa (Kerry)	Coolyroe
	A Roche 0-4 (2f), M Fitzgibbon (0-1).	Report	E O'Shea 1-7, P Clifford 0-4, D Clifford 0-4 (2f), T O’Shea 0-3, M Rennie 0-2, C O'Shea 0-1, H Kelly 0-1.	Stadium: Quaid Park; Referee: J Bermingham

26 November 2022 Semi-final	Thurles Sarsfields (Tipperary)	0-12 - 2-11	Kilmurry (Cork)	Templetuohy
	P Creedon 0-5 (0-4 f), L McCormack 0-2 f, K Bracken 0-2, D Stakelum, K Costello, H Fogarty 0-1 each.	Report	L Wall 0-6 (0-2 f), P Berhanu 1-1, D McCarthy 1-0, K Kelleher, J Mullane, B Hinchin, R Leahy 0-1 each.	Stadium: Longorchard Grounds; Referee: J Hayes

=== Munster final ===
11 December 2022 Final	Fossa (Kerry)	1-17 - 1-06	Kilmurry (Cork)	Mallow GAA Complex
	D Clifford 0-10 (7 frees), P Clifford 1-4, E O’Shea 0-2 (1 free), M Rennie 0-1.	Report	L Wall 1-2, D McCarthy 0-1, D Cahalane 0-1, P Berhanua 0-1, T Collins 0-1.	Referee: N Quinn (Clare)

== Ulster Junior Club Football Championship ==
=== Ulster preliminary round ===
30 October 2022 Preliminary round	Drumlane (Cavan)	1-08 – 0-10	Craigbane (Derry)	Cavan
	R Connolly 0-4, C Flynn 1-0, D Dolan 0-2, D McGurren 0-1, L Belton 0-1	Report	L Moore 0-8, T O'Connor 0-2	Stadium: Kingspan Breffni Park; Referee: Enda Mallon

=== Ulster quarter-finals ===
5 November 2022 Quarter-final	Teconnaught (Down)	0-05 – 2-20	Stewartstown Harps (Tyrone)	Newry
	P Grant 0-3, C Carville 0-2	Report	G Devlin 1-5, D Lowe 0-7, M Quinn 1-2, C Quinn 0-2, D McElhatton 0-1, K Robinson 0-1, J Park 0-1, T Lowe 0-1	Stadium: Páirc Esler; Referee: Shane Murphy

6 November 2022 Quarter-final	Derrynoose (Armagh)	1-12 – 1-13	Letterkenny Gaels (Donegal)	Crossmaglen
	Conor McNally 1-9, P McGrane 0-1, D Mone 0-1, Conall McNally 0-1.	Report	C McBrearty 0-5, B O'Brien 1-0, S Doherty 0-3, R Frain 0-2, D Ó Cathail 0-2, B Diver 0-1.	Stadium: St. Oliver Plunkett Park; Referee: Conor Curran

6 November 2022 Quarter-final	Newtownbutler First Fermanaghs (Fermanagh)	3-18 – 1-06	Na Piarsaigh (Antrim)	Enniskillen
	R Carson 2-4, G O'Keeffe 1-4, D King 0-5, J Flanagan 0-1, C Courtney 0-1, J Connolly 0-1, P Mullaney 0-1, F Mulligan 0-1.	Report	J Smith 1-0, S Fitzsimmons 0-2, P Donaghy 0-1, S Moreland 0-1, F Grew 0-1, J Begley 0-1.	Stadium: Brewster Park; Referee: Richie Donoghue

6 November 2022 Quarter-final	Clones (Monaghan)	0-13 – 1-11	Drumlane (Cavan)	Clones
	Darren Freeman 0-4, David Freeman 0-3, E Audley 0-1, F Beggan 0-1, C Dowd 0-1, R Nolan 0-1, R Kierans 0-1.		R Connolly 0-8, M Owens 1-1, C Flynn 0-1, L Belton 0-1.	Stadium: St Tiernach's Park; Referee: Mark Loughran

=== Ulster semi-finals ===
20 November 2022 Semi-final	Letterkenny Gaels (Donegal)	2-05 – 2-15	Stewartstown Harps (Tyrone)	Dungiven
	C McBrearty 1-4, P Doherty 1-0, B Diver 0-1	Report	D Lowe 1-6, G Devlin 0-6, A Coyle 1-1, C Quinn 0-1, C Devlin 0-1	Stadium: Owenbeg; Referee: Micheál Moore

20 November 2022 Semi-final	Drumlane (Cavan)	3-15 – 1-08	Newtownbutler First Fermanaghs (Fermanagh)	Clones
	D McGurren 1-4, M Owens 1-3, D Dolan 1-0, L Belton 0-3, R Connolly 0-2, G Tubman 0-2, J McCahill 0-1	Report	F Mulligan 1-0, S Conlon 0-3, D King 0-2, J Flanagan 0-2, G O'Keefe 0-1	Stadium: St Tiernach's Park; Referee: Enda McFeely

=== Ulster final ===
26 November 2022 Final	Drumlane (Cavan)	0-15 - 1-12; Penalties: 4-5	Stewartstown Harps (Tyrone)	Clones
	R Connolly (0-9, 0-8 frees); M Owens (0-2), D McGurren (0-2), C Flynn (0-1, f), D Dolan (0-1).		D Lowe (1-1, 1-0 pen, 0-1 frees), A Coyle (0-4), G Devlin (0-4 frees), C Quinn (0-1), T Rush (0-1 free); T Lowe (0-1 mark). Subs: A Coyle (0-4, 4f)	Stadium: St Tiernach's Park; Referee: M Dorrian

== All-Britain Club Football Championship ==
=== Britain quarter-finals ===
8 October 2022 Quarter-final	Glasgow Gaels (Scotland)	5-15 - 0-05	Brothers Pearse (Yorkshire)

10 October 2022 Quarter-final	Roger Casement’s (Warwickshire)	5-21 - 0-03	Éire Óg (Hertfordshire)

10 October 2022 Quarter-final	Wandsworth Gaels (London)	w/o - scr.	St Jude's (Gloucestershire)

=== Britain semi-finals ===
23 October 2022 Semi-final	Roger Casement’s (Warwickshire)	2-07 - 1-17	Glasgow Gaels (Scotland)

22 October 2022 Semi-final	St Brendan's (Lancashire)	1-13 - 1-12	Wandsworth Gaels (London)

=== Britain final ===
6 November 2022 Final	Glasgow Gaels (Scotland)	1-09 - 0-07	St Brendan's (Lancashire)

== All-Ireland Junior Club Football Championship ==
=== All-Ireland quarter-final ===
11 December 2022 Quarter-final	Glasgow Gaels (Scotland)	2-05 - 2-10	Stewartstown Harps (Tyrone)	Clydebank Community Sports Hub
	D Ashmore 2-0, R Stevenson 0-2, S O'Brien 0-1, D Elliot 0-1, L Ryan 0-1.		D Lowe 2-2, A Coyle 0-2, D McElhatton 0-2, C Quinn 0-1, T Lowe 0-1, G Devlin 0-1.

=== All-Ireland semi-finals ===
7 January 2023 Semi-final	Castletown (Meath)	0-11 - 3-14	Fossa (Kerry)	MW Hire O'Moore Park
	K Ross (0-6, 4 frees, 1 mark); R McConnell (1 free), S Doherty (0-2 each); K Price (0-1).	Report	D Clifford (0-7, 1 free); E O’Shea (1-1, 0-1 free); P Clifford (0-2, 1 45); C O’Shea, E Talbot (1-0 each); D Rennie, H Buckley, D O’Keeffe, T O’Shea (0-1 each).

7 January 2023 Semi-final	Clifden (Galway)	1-09 - 1-13 (aet)	Stewartstown Harps (Tyrone)	Dr. Hyde Park
	G Gibbons 0-9 (0-8f), J O’Brien 1-0.	Report	G Devlin 1-6 (0-4f); G O’Neill, T Rush, D McElhatton, S Talbot, J Park, M Quinn, T Lowe (m), A Coyle (f) 0-1 each.

=== All-Ireland final ===
15 January 2023 Final	Fossa (Kerry)	0-19 - 1-13	Stewartstown Harps (Tyrone)	Croke Park
	D Clifford (0-11, 3 frees); E O’Shea (1 mark), H Buckley (0-3 each); P Clifford (0-2).	Report	G Devlin (1-5, 0-3 frees); D Lowe (0-3, 2 frees); M Quinn, S Talbot (0-2 each); C Quinn (0-1).	Referee: T Murphy (Galway)

== Championship statistics ==
=== Top scorers ===
Overall

Rank	Player	Club	Tally	Total	Matches	Average
1	Gareth Devlin	Stewartstown Harps	3-27	36	6	6.00
2	David Clifford	Fossa	0-32	32	4	8.00
3	Dan Lowe	Stewartstown Harps	4-19	31	6	5.16
4	Ryan Connolly	Drumlane	0-23	23	4	5.75
5	Kevin Ross	Castletown	0-22	22	4	5.50
6	Conor Hickey	St. Abban's, Adamstown	1-18	21	4	5.25
6	Ger Gibbons	Clifden	0-21	21	3	7.00
8	Emmet O'Shea	Fossa	2-13	19	4	4.75
9	Paudie Clifford	Fossa	1-12	15	4	3.75
10	Shane McGrath	Clonmore	0-13	13	3	4.33

In a single game

Rank	Player	Club	Tally	Total	Opposition
1	Conor McNally	Derrynoose	1-09	12	Letterkenny Gaels
2	Ryan Carson	Newtownbutler First Fermanaghs	2-04	10	Na Piarsaigh
2	Emmet O'Shea	Fossa	1-07	10	Castlemahon
2	David Clifford	Fossa	0-10	10	Kilmurry
5	Conor Dunne	Ballycommon	2-03	9	Erin's Own
5	Gareth Devlin	Stewartstown Harps	1-06	9	Clifden
5	John Hand	Grattan Óg	1-06	9	Clonmore
5	Dan Lowe	Stewartstown Harps	1-06	9	Letterkenny Gaels
5	Ryan Connolly	Drumlane	0-09	9	Stewartstown Harps
5	Ger Gibbons	Clifden	0-09	9	Stewartstown Harps
