= Graham O'Sullivan =

Kerry Gaelic footballer

Personal information
- Date of birth: c. 1998 (age 27–28)
- Place of birth: County Kerry, Ireland

Team information
- Current team: Dromid Parses; Kerry county team

Graham O'Sullivan is an Irish Gaelic footballer who plays for the Dromid Parses club and at senior level for the Kerry county team.

Sullivan made his senior championship debut in the 2022 Munster Senior Football Championship semi-final against Cork, though he had been involved with the senior panel for four years. 2022 marked his breakthrough season for his county and his performance in that year's All-Ireland SFC Final was ranked alongside those of David Clifford, Shane Walsh and Cillian McDaid.

O'Sullivan played at cornerback for Kerry in the 2022 All-Ireland SFC Final. He was assigned to mark Robert Finnerty and kept him from influencing the game, while also scoring a point.
