= Coolgarriv =

Coolgarriv An Chúil Gharbh
- Townland
- Coolgarriv shown within Ireland
- Coordinates: 52.0785°N 9.5191°W
- Country: Ireland
- County: County Kerry
- Barony: Magunihy
- Civil parish: Aghadoe

Area
  - Total: 91 ha (220 acres)

Coolgarriv (Irish: An Chúil Gharbh) is a townland on the outskirts of Killarney, County Kerry, Ireland. It is located on Madam's Hill, overlooking Killarney in the nearby valley. It is bordered by Aghadoe and Knockasarnett townlands. Coolgarriv is part of Fossa parish, in the Diocese of Kerry.

== Transport ==
The main N22 Tralee-Killarney-Cork road goes through Coolgarriv. Branching off from this is the Killarney-Ballyhar-Firies road.

The Mallow–Killarney–Tralee rail line passes through Coolgarriv and the nearest railway station is Killarney railway station.

== See also ==
- List of townlands of County Kerry
