= Jack Sherwood (Gaelic footballer) =

Gaelic football player

Jack Daly
Personal information
- Born: 17 February 1991 (age 35) Dublin, Ireland
- Occupation: Biomedical Engineer
- Height: 1.85 m (6 ft 1 in)

Sport
- Sport: Gaelic Football
- Position: Centre Back
Club
- Years: Club
- 2008–: Firies East Kerry
Club titles
- Kerry titles: 3
Inter-county*
Years	County	Apps (scores)
2013–	Kerry	2 (0–0)
Inter-county titles
- Munster titles: 4
- All-Irelands: 1
- *Inter County team apps and scores correct as of 20 September 2015.

Jack Sherwood (born 17 February 1991) is a footballer with the Kerry senior football team. He has played with Kerry at all levels from minor to senior. He then moved on to the Under 21 team and played in the Munster final in 2012 but lost out to Cork. Following on from his displays with the Under 21 team he moved on to the Junior team where he won Munster and All Ireland titles.

== Honours ==
Firies

- Kerry Premier Junior Football Championship (1): 2024
- Kerry Junior Football Championship (1): 2022 (c)

East Kerry

- Kerry Senior Football Championship (3): 2019, 2020, 2022

Kerry

- Munster Minor Football Championship (2): 2008, 2009
- Munster Junior Football Championship (1): 2012
- All-Ireland Junior Football Championship (1): 2012
- Munster Senior Football Championship (4): 2013, 2014, 2015, 2019
- All-Ireland Senior Football Championship (1): 2014
- Kerry Senior Football Championship (2): 2019, 2020
