= Paudie Clifford =

Kerry Gaelic footballer (born 1997)

Personal information
- Native name: Pádraig Ó Clúmháin (Irish)
- Born: September, 1997 Tralee, County Kerry, Ireland
- Occupation: Business Development Executive at Red Chair Recruitment
- Height: 5 ft 10 in (178 cm)

Sport
- Sport: Gaelic football
- Position: Half forward
Clubs
- Years: Club
- 2015 – Present 2018 – Present: Fossa; East Kerry (Divisional)
Club titles
- Kerry titles: 4
College(s)
- Years: College
- 2015 – 2018 2018 – 2019: Cork IT; University College Cork
College titles
- Sigerson titles: 1
Inter-county*
| Years | County | Apps (scores) |
| 2020 – Present | Kerry | 31 (2–46) |
Inter-county titles
- Munster titles: 5
- All-Irelands: 2
- NFL: 3
- All Stars: 4
- *Inter County team apps and scores correct as of match played 27 July 2025.

Paudie Clifford (Irish: Pádraig Ó Clúmháin) is an Irish Gaelic footballer. He is centre back and captain of Fossa, half forward for regional side East Kerry and at senior level for the Kerry county team. He is the older brother of fellow Kerry footballer David Clifford.

== Club ==
Clifford plays for the Fossa GAA club in County Kerry and for divisional side East Kerry GAA.

He won the 2016 Kerry Junior Football Championship and the 2022 Kerry Premier Junior Football Championship with Fossa. Clifford would also win both the Munster Junior Football Championship and the All-Ireland Junior Football Championship with Fossa in 2022.

He is also a four-time winner of the Kerry Senior Football Championship with East Kerry GAA

== Kerry ==
=== Junior ===
As a member of the Kerry junior team, Clifford won the 2018 All-Ireland Junior Football Championship and Munster Junior Football Championship.

=== 2020 ===
Clifford made his senior debut for Kerry in 2020.

=== 2021 ===
Kerry won the 2021 National League and the 2021 Munster Senior Football Championship.

He won his first All Star award at Centre Forward. He was also chosen on The Sunday Game Team of the Year.

=== 2022 ===
Clifford's Kerry team won every competition they entered in 2022. The 2022 McGrath Cup was followed with the 2022 National Football League and the 2022 Munster Senior Football Championship.

On 24 July, Kerry won the 2022 All-Ireland Senior Football Championship Final, giving the county their 38th title and Clifford his first.

Clifford won his second All Star award at Wing Forward. He also was chosen on The Sunday Game Team of the Year.

=== 2023 ===
Clifford helped Kerry win the 2023 Munster Senior Football Championship. Clifford's Kerry would reach the 2023 All-Ireland Senior Football Final, however Kerry would lose to Dublin by two points.

Clifford won his third All Star award at Wing Forward. He also was chosen on The Sunday Game Team of the Year.

Clifford would also captain East Kerry to win his fourth Kerry Senior Football Championship.

=== 2024 ===
Clifford won his fourth Munster Senior Football Championship.

=== 2025 ===
Clifford's Kerry team won every competition they entered in 2025. Clifford would play in every game of the 2025 National Football League scoring 1-12.

Clifford would miss the 2025 Munster Senior Football final after receiving a red card in the semi-final.

Clifford won his second All-Ireland Senior Football Championship scoring 0-03 in the win against Donegal. Clifford would receive praise for his performance in the final as he had racked up 76 possessions of the ball in the game.

Clifford won his fourth All Star award at Wing Forward. He also was chosen on The Sunday Game Team of the Year.

=== 2026 ===
In the 2026 All-Ireland Final, Kerry lost to Mayo, with Clifford scoring 0-3. He was selected at 11 in The Sunday Game 2026 Team of the Year.

== Third-level ==
During his time in third level college in Cork, Clifford lined out with both Cork Institute of Technology and University College Cork.

With UCC GAA, he was part of the college's 2019 Sigerson Cup winning side.

== Career statistics ==
As of match played 27 July 2025

| Team | Year | National League | | | Munster | | All-Ireland | | Total | |
| Team | Year | Division | Apps | Score | Apps | Score | Apps | Score | Apps | Score |
|---|---|---|---|---|---|---|---|---|---|---|
| Kerry | 2020 | Division 1 | 1 | 0-00 | 1 | 0-00 | - | | 2 | 0-00 |
| Kerry | 2021 | Division 1 | 4 | 1-05 | 3 | 0-06 | 1 | 0-02 | 8 | 1-13 |
| Kerry | 2022 | Division 1 | 8 | 0-10 | 2 | 0-04 | 3 | 0-04 | 13 | 0-18 |
| Kerry | 2023 | Division 1 | 6 | 1-05 | 2 | 1-01 | 6 | 1-09 | 14 | 3-15 |
| Kerry | 2024 | Division 1 | 6 | 0-10 | 2 | 0-02 | 5 | 0-08 | 13 | 0-20 |
| Kerry | 2025 | Division 1 | 8 | 1-12 | 1 | 0-02 | 5 | 0-08 | 14 | 1-22 |
| Kerry | Total | | 33 | 3-45 | 11 | 1-15 | 20 | 1-31 | 64 | 5-88 |

== Honours ==
Fossa

- Kerry Premier Junior Football Championship (1): 2022 (c)
- Munster Junior Club Football Championship (1): 2022 (c)
- All-Ireland Junior Club Football Championship (1): 2022 (c)
- Kerry Junior Football Championship (1): 2016

East Kerry

- Kerry Senior Football Championship (4): 2019, 2020, 2022, 2023 (c)

Kerry

- All-Ireland Senior Football Championship (2): 2022, 2025
- Munster Senior Football Championship (5): 2021, 2022, 2023, 2024, 2025
- All-Ireland Junior Football Championship (1): 2018
- Munster Junior Football Championship (1): 2018
- National Football League (2): 2021, 2022, 2025
- McGrath Cup: 2022

University College Cork

- Sigerson Cup (1): 2019

Individual

- All Star (4): 2021, 2022, 2023, 2025
- The Sunday Game Team of the Year (4): 2021, 2022, 2023, 2025
