= 2018–19 All-Ireland Junior Club Football Championship =

- Sponsor: Allied Irish Bank
- Champions: Beaufort (1st title); Nathan Breen (captain); Éanna O'Malley (manager)
- Runners-up: Easkey; Eugene Mullen (captain); Dessie Sloyan (manager)

The 2018–19 All-Ireland Junior Club Football Championship was the 18th staging of the All-Ireland Junior Club Football Championship since its establishment by the Gaelic Athletic Association.

The All-Ireland final was played on 9 February 2019 at Croke Park in Dublin, between Beaufort and Easkey. Beaufort won the match by 3-17 to 0-05 to claim their first ever championship title.

== Connacht Junior Club Football Championship ==
=== Connacht final ===
17 November 2018 Connacht final	Clonbur St Patrick's (Galway)	1-10 - 1-11	Easkey (Sligo)	Enniscrone

== Leinster Junior Club Football Championship ==
=== Leinster final ===
8 December 2018 Leinster final	Dundalk Young Irelands (Louth)	2-10 - 2-07	St Brigid's (Offaly)	Gaelic Grounds

== Munster Junior Club Football Championship ==
=== Munster final ===
2 December 2018 Munster final	Beaufort (Kerry)	2-13 - 2-12	Dromtarriffe (Cork)	Mallow

== Ulster Junior Club Football Championship ==
=== Ulster final ===
17 November 2018 Ulster final	Red Hughs (Donegal)	1-11 - 1-09	Limavady (Derry)	Celtic Park

== All-Britain Club Football Championship ==
=== Britain final ===
18 November 2018 Britain final	Neasden Gaels (London)	2-12 - 3-12	Dunedin Connollys (Scotland)	Old Bedians

== All-Ireland Junior Club Football Championship ==
=== All-Ireland quarter-final ===
9 December 2018 Quarter-final	Red Hughs (Donegal)	3-11 - 1-15	Dunedin Connollys (Scotland)	O'Donnell Park

=== All-Ireland semi-finals ===
20 January 2019 Semi-final	Easkey (Sligo)	1-08 - 0-09	Red Hughs (Donegal)	Seán O'Heslin Memorial Park

20 January 2019 Semi-final	Beaufort (Kerry)	0-12 - 0-10	Dundalk Young Irelands (Louth)	O'Moore Park

=== All-Ireland final ===
9 February 2019 Final	Beaufort (Kerry)	3-17 - 0-05	Easkey (Sligo)	Croke Park
