= Castlemaine =

Castlemaine or Castle Maine may refer to:

== Australia ==
- Castlemaine, Victoria, a town
  - Castlemaine Football Club, an Australian rules football club
  - Castlemaine railway station
- Castlemaine Brewery, Western Australia, ceased trading in 1927
- Castlemaine Perkins, a Queensland-based brewery, known for the XXXX range of beers
- HMAS Castlemaine, a ship in the Royal Australian Navy

== Elsewhere ==
- Castlemaine, County Kerry, Ireland, a village
  - Castle Maine, a former castle in the village
- Baron Castlemaine, in the peerage of Ireland
- Roger Palmer, 1st Earl of Castlemaine, English courtier
- Barbara Palmer, 1st Duchess of Cleveland, wife of Roger Palmer
