= 1891 Kerry Senior Football Championship =

Gaelic football competition

- Dates: 24
- Champions: Ballymacelligott (1st title)
- Runners-up: Keel Geraldines

The 1891 Kerry Senior Football Championship was the third staging of the Kerry Senior Football Championship since its establishment by the Kerry County Board in 1889.

Laune Rangers entered the championship as the defending champions, however, they were beaten by Keel Geraldines in the semi-finals.

The final was played between Ballymacelligott and Keel Geraldines, in what was their first meeting in the final. Ballymacelligott won the match by 1–08 to 0–01 to claim their first ever championship title.

== Results ==
=== Final ===
Final	Ballymacelligott	1-08 - 0-01	Keel Geraldines

== Championship statistics ==
=== Miscellaneous ===
- Ballymacelligott win the title for the first time.
- Keel Geraldines qualify or the final for the first time.
