= Dromid Pearses GAA =

Gaelic football club in County Kerry, Ireland

Dromid Pearses
- Piarsaigh na Dromoda
- Founded: 1946
- County: Kerry
- Colours: Maroon and White
- Grounds: Pairc an Phiarsaigh
- Coordinates: 51°53′39.57″N 10°05′16.45″W

Playing kits
Standard colours

Dromid Pearses is a Gaelic Athletic Association club from the parish of Dromid, on the Ivearagh peninsula, South Kerry in County Kerry, Ireland.

== History ==
Dromid Pearses was founded in 1946 by Sean Hard Curran. They have a football field at Inchintinny, Mastergeehy. Construction of the pitch started in 1979 and later dressing rooms that was officially opened on 20 October 1991. The club subsequently built an additional stand, new dug outs, floodlights and a new scoreboard.

== Achievements ==
- Munster Junior Club Football Championship (1): 2011
- Kerry Premier Junior Football Championship (1): 2017
- Kerry Junior Football Championship (1): 2011
- Kerry Novice Football Championship (1): 1999
- South Kerry Senior Football Championship (3): 2004 2019, 2022

== Women's team ==
In 2009, Dromid Pearses formed a women's team. Players from all over South Kerry joined up to play and the club were competitive for several years. However, with the popularity of the Southern Gaels Ladies team, Dromid Pearses Ladies found it difficult to field a team and ceased playing in 2015.

== Notable players ==
=== All-Ireland winners ===
SFC

- Declan O'Sullivan (5): 2004, 2006 (c), 2007 (c), 2009, 2014
- Graham O'Sullivan (1): 2022, 2025

JFC

- Niall O'Shea (2): 2012, 2016
- Denis Shine O'Sullivan (1): 2006

U21FC

- Aidan O'Sullivan (1): 2008

MFC

- Graham O'Sullivan (2): 2015, 2016

Hogan Cup

- Dominic O'Sullivan (1): 2009
- Niall O'Shea (1): 2009
- Pádraig Ó Sullivan (1): 2009
- Ciarán O Shea (1): 2009

=== National Football League ===
National Football League Division 1

- Declan O'Sullivan (3): 2004, 2006 (c), 2009

=== All Stars ===
- Declan O'Sullivan (3): 2007, 2008 2009

=== Others ===
- Jack O'Connor
