= Fossa GAA =

Gaelic Athletic Association club in County Kerry, Ireland

Fossa
- Fosadh
- Founded: 1970
- County: Kerry
- Colours: Red and Black
- Grounds: Fossa

Playing kits
Standard colours

Senior Club Championships
	All Ireland	Munster champions	Kerry champions
Football:	1 (Junior)	1 (Junior)	1 (Intermediate); 1 (Premier Junior); 1 (Junior)

Fossa GAA is a Gaelic Athletic Association club located in Fossa, County Kerry, Ireland. The club is concerned with the game of Gaelic football and is a member of the East Kerry GAA board. They have won Intermediate, Premier Junior and Junior Kerry championships, a Munster Junior Club Football Championship and an All-Ireland Junior Club Football Championship.

== History ==
Located four miles west of Killarney, County Kerry, Fossa GAA Club was founded on 11 January 1970. The club leased a field from the nearby Liebherr firm in 1972 and the following year fielded its first team in the East Kerry League and Championship and in Division 4 of the County League. Fossa won their first championship in 2016, winning the Kerry Junior Championship.

Fossa won the Kerry Premier Junior title in 2022, beating Listry in the final after extra-time. They went on to claim the Munster Junior title after wins over Castlemahon in the semi-final and Kilmurry in the final. On 15 January 2023, Fossa faced Stewartstown Harps at Croke Park in the All-Ireland final. Fossa won by 0–19 to 1–13 in a bad-tempered game which featured six red cards.

In Fossa's first year in the Kerry Intermediate Championship in 2023, they reached the final after a penalty shoot-out win over Austin Stacks. Fossa lost the final by a point to Milltown/Castlemaine

== Honours ==
- All-Ireland Junior Club Football Championship
  - (1): 2022–23
- Munster Junior Club Football Championship
  - (1): 2022
- Kerry Intermediate Football Championship
  - (1): 2026
- Kerry Premier Junior Football Championship
  - (1): 2022
- Kerry Junior Football Championship
  - (1): 2016
- East Kerry Junior Football Championship
  - (2) 1975, 2023

== Notable players ==
- David Clifford
- Paudie Clifford
