= Ballymacelligott GAA =

GAA club in Ballymacelligott, County Kerry, Ireland

Ballymacelligott
- Baile Mhic Ealagóid
- County: Kerry
- Nickname: Ballymac
- Colours
- Grounds: Ballymacelligott GAA Park

Playing kits
Standard colours

Senior Club Championships
	All Ireland	Munster champions	Kerry champions
Football:	0	0	4

Ballymacelligott GAA is a Gaelic Athletic Association club in Ballymacelligott, County Kerry, Ireland. The club is exclusively concerned with the game of Gaelic football.

== History ==
Located in the parish of Ballymacelligott, about five miles east of Tralee, the Gaelic Athletic Association has been active in the area since its foundation in 1884. Ballymacelligott GAA Club, along with Laune Rangers, became one of the most dominant clubs in the early years of competitive Gaelic football. The club won three Kerry SFC titles from four appearances in finals between 1891 and 1895. Ballymacelligott's fourth and final Kerry SFC title was won after a defeat of Faranfore in 1918.

A period of decline followed, with the club disbanding for a period before returning to win the Castleisland District League in 1945. This was followed by a return to the Kerry SFC in the 1950s. Ballymacelligott claimed their first title in 75 years when they won the Kerry NFC. The club's most recent title success came in 2025, when Ballymacelligott beat St Senan's in a penalty shootout to win the Kerry PJFC title.

== Honours ==
- Kerry Senior Football Championship (4): 1891, 1894, 1895, 1918
- All-Ireland Junior Club Football Championship (1): 2026
- Munster Junior Club Football Championship (1): 2025
- Kerry Premier Junior Football Championship (1): 2025
- Kerry Novice Football Championship (1): 1993
- St Brendan's District Senior Football Championship (1): 2022

== Notable players ==
- Phil O'Sullivan: All-Ireland SFC-winning captain (1924)
- Ruairi O'Rahilly – Irish Gaelic footballer
