= Firies GAA =

GAA club in Firies, County Kerry, Ireland

Firies
- Fiodh Ros
- Founded: 1962
- County: Kerry
- Colours: Blue and navy
- Grounds: Farranfore

Playing kits
Standard colours

Firies GAA is a Gaelic Athletic Association club in Farranfore, County Kerry, Ireland. Affiliated to the East Kerry Board, the club is solely concerned with the game of Gaelic football.

== History ==
Located in the village of Farranfore, County Kerry, Firies GAA Club was founded in 1962. The club has spent all of its existence operating in the junior grades. The club won its first-ever Kerry JFC title after a nine-point defeat of Cordal in 2022. Firies claimed the Kerry PJFC title two years later after an extra-time defeat of Ardfert.

== Honours ==
- Kerry Premier Junior Football Championship (1): 2024
- Kerry Junior Football Championship (1): 2022
- Kerry Novice Football Championship (1) 1995

== Notable players ==
- Donal Daly: All-Ireland SFC-winner (1997, 2000)
- Jack Sherwood: All-Ireland SFC-winner (2014)
