= Beaufort GAA =

Beaufort
- Lios an Phúca
- Founded: 1929
- County: Kerry
- Colours: Blue and yellow
- Grounds: Páirc Uí Chocláin

Playing kits
Standard colours

Beaufort GAA is a Gaelic Athletic Association club located in Beaufort, County Kerry, Ireland. The club is solely concerned with the game of Gaelic football.

== History ==
Located in the village of Beaufort, between Killarney and Killorglin, Beaufort GAA Club was founded in 1929. The club has spent most of its existence operating in the junior grade, however, Kerry IFC titles were claimed in 1980 and again in 2000.

Beaufort enjoyed one of its most successful seasons during 2018–19. After claiming the Kerry JFC title, the club subsequently beat Dromtarriffe to win the Munster Club JFC title. On 9 February 2019, Beaufort defeated Easkey by 3–17 to 0–05 in the All-Ireland final.

== Honours ==
- All-Ireland Junior Club Football Championship: 2019
- Munster Junior Club Football Championship: 2018
- Kerry Intermediate Football Championship: 1980, 2000
- Kerry Premier Junior Football Championship: 2018
- Kerry Junior Football Championship: 1977
- Mid Kerry Senior Football Championship: 1976, 1977, 1978, 1979, 1980, 1982, 1998, 2016, 2017, 2021, 2022, 2024, 2025

== Notable players ==
- Mike Breen: All-Ireland SFC runner-up (2023)
- Kevin Coffey: All-Ireland SFC-winner (1959, 1962)
- Murt Kelly: All-Ireland SFC-winner (1939, 1940, 1941)
- Brendan Lynch: All-Ireland SFC-winner (1969, 1970, 1975)
- Paudie Lynch: All-Ireland SFC-winner (1975, 1978, 1979, 1980, 1981)
