= Fossa, County Kerry =

Village in County Kerry, Ireland

Fossa An Fosadh
- Townland
- Location in Ireland
- Coordinates: 52°04′14″N 9°35′00″W
- Country: Ireland
- Province: Munster
- County: County Kerry
- Time zone: UTC+0 (WET)
  - Summer (DST): UTC-1 (IST (WEST))

Fossa (Irish: An Fosadh) is a village and parish in County Kerry, Ireland, north of the Lakes of Killarney.

Townlands in Fossa parish include Aghadoe and Coolgarriv.

== Notable people ==
- David Clifford, Kerry and Fossa Gaelic footballer (born 1999)
- Paudie Clifford, Gaelic footballer (born 1997)
- Michael Fassbender, born 1977 in Heidelberg, lived in Fossa

== See also ==
- List of towns and villages in Ireland
