= Kilcummin, County Kerry =

Village near Killarney, Ireland

Kilcummin Cill Chuimín
- Village
- Location in Ireland
- Coordinates: 52°05′53″N 9°28′11″W
- Country: Ireland
- Province: Munster
- County: County Kerry

Population (2022)
  - Total: 612

Kilcummin (Irish: Cill Chuimín, meaning 'St Cummin's church') is a village in County Kerry, Ireland, about 6 kilometres (4 mi) north-east of Killarney. The population was 612 at the 2022 census. Kilcummin GAA Club was formed in 1910 and competes in Gaelic football. Seán Kelly, currently an MEP and formerly GAA president, was born in Kilcummin. Founded in 1979, Mastergeeha FC is a local association football (soccer) club.
