= Ballymacelligott =

Ballymacelligott Baile Mhic Eileagóid
- Civil parish
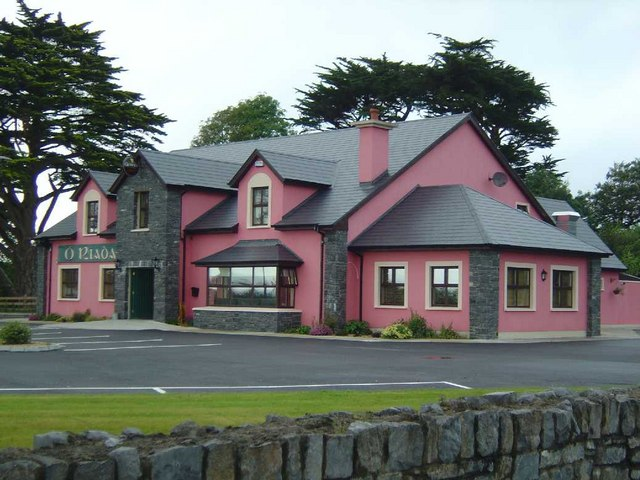
- O'Riada's Bar is in Ballymacelligott parish, on the N21 road between Castleisland and Tralee

- Location in Ireland
- Coordinates: 52°15′12″N 9°36′39″W
- Country: Ireland
- Province: Munster
- County: County Kerry

Area
  - Total: 56 km^{2} (22 sq mi)
- Time zone: UTC+0 (WET)
  - Summer (DST): UTC-1 (IST (WEST))
- Irish Grid Reference: Q905125

Ballymacelligott (Irish: Baile Mhic Eileagóid) is a civil parish in the north of County Kerry in Ireland. It is situated 7 kilometres (4.3 mi) east of Tralee in the historical barony of Trughanacmy.

== History ==
A quarry was first built in Ballymacelligott in 1811 as a source for building materials for construction of a barracks in Tralee.

The local Church of Ireland (Anglican) church, Ballymacelligott Church, was built in 1820, and is listed on Kerry County Council's Record of Protected Structures. It is in the Diocese of Limerick and Killaloe. The nearby Catholic church, the Church of the Immaculate Conception, is in the Roman Catholic Diocese of Kerry and was described in 1837 as being a "large slated building".

Edenburn House, later used as a hospital, is also in Ballymacelligott.

== Demographics ==
In 1831, the population was 3,535, and by 1841 had grown to 4,058.

== Sports ==
The Ballymacelligott handball club was founded in 1950. The area is also home to two soccer clubs, Ballymac Celtic and Ballymac Galaxy, which both play in the Kerry District League.
