= St Mary's GAA (Kerry) =

Gaelic games club in County Kerry, Ireland

St Mary's
- Founded: 1890
- County: Kerry
- Nickname: Marys
- Colours: White and Blue
- Grounds: Con Keating Park
- Coordinates: 51°56′43″N 10°14′03″W

Playing kits
Standard colours

St Mary's are a Gaelic Athletic Association Gaelic football club from town of Cahersiveen in the south of County Kerry, Ireland. They are one of the most successful teams in South Kerry, having won the South Kerry Senior Football Championship 41 times. The club has also won All-Ireland titles at junior and intermediate levels.

== History ==
Preceding Saint Mary's, a club known as O'Connells Caherciveen was the first club founded in the town of Caherciveen. This club was founded on 10 December 1890 and won the South Kerry Senior Football Championship six times. They also won their first and only county championship in 1896.

In 1929, the local Christian Brothers school was allowed to enter a team in the South Kerry Junior Championship under the name Saint Mary's. Cahersiveen, thus had two teams entering competitions for a four-year overlap; however, due to emigration the club was dissolved and merged with Saint Mary’s. Since 1933 Saint Mary's has solely represented the town of Cahersiveen.

In 1947, the club purchased a playing field in the West end and the Con Keating Park was officially opened on 6 August 1950.

== Honours ==
- All-Ireland Intermediate Club Football Championship (1): 2016
- All-Ireland Junior Club Football Championship (1): 2011
- Munster Intermediate Club Football Championship (1): 2015
- Munster Junior Club Football Championship (1): 2010
- Kerry Senior Football Championship (1): 1896 as O'Connells Caherciveen
- Kerry Intermediate Football Championship (2): 2001, 2015
- Kerry Junior Football Championship (2): 1983, 2010
- South Kerry Senior Football Championship (6): 1902, 1903, 1904, 1928, 1929, 1931 as O'Connells Caherciveen
- South Kerry Senior Football Championships (41): 1932, 1937, 1938, 1940, 1941, 1942, 1943, 1944, 1947, 1949, 1952, 1954, 1955, 1960, 1969, 1971, 1973, 1978, 1980, 1984, 1985, 1991, 1992, 1995, 2001, 2002, 2003, 2009, 2010, 2011, 2014, 2015, 2016, 2017, 2018, 2020, 2021, 2023, 2024, 2025, 2026

== Notable players ==
- Jack O'Shea, seven time All-Ireland Senior Football Championship winner. Four time Texaco Footballer of the Year 1980-81, 1984-85. Six time All-Star.
- Maurice Fitzgerald, two time All-Ireland Senior Football Championship winner. 1997 Texaco Footballer of the Year. Three time All-Star.
- Jerome O'Shea, three time All-Ireland Senior Football Championship winner.
- Bryan Sheehan, five time All-Ireland Senior Football Championship winner. All-Star winner.
- Peter Keane, former Kerry minor and senior manager.
