= Glenflesk =

Village in County Kerry, Ireland

Glenflesk Gleann Fleisce
- Village
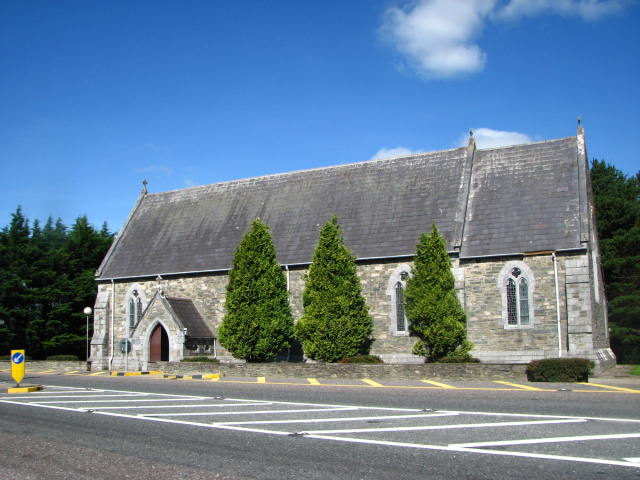
- St Agatha's church, Glenflesk

- Location in Ireland
- Coordinates: 52.0125°N 9.361°W
- Country: Ireland
- Province: Munster
- County: Kerry
- Irish Grid Reference: W066853

Glenflesk (Irish: Gleann Fleisce) is a small village in County Kerry, Ireland. It is 10 km south-east of Killarney, and is on the N22 road which is the main road between Cork and Killarney.

The local Roman Catholic church is dedicated to Saint Agatha and was built c. 1860. Glenflesk is in the Roman Catholic Diocese of Kerry. Glenflesk National School is a co-educational primary (national) school which had 34 pupils enrolled as of the 2020 school year. The local Gaelic Athletic Association club, Glenflesk GAA, fields Gaelic football teams in the East Kerry Division.

There are several buses every day to Killarney.
