= Kerry Premier Junior Football Championship =

Annual Gaelic football competition

- Current season or competition: 2025 Kerry Premier Junior Football Championship
- Irish: Craobhchomórtas Peile Príomh-Shóisearach Chiarraí
- Code: Gaelic football
- Founded: 2016; 10 years ago
- Region: Kerry (GAA)
- Trophy: Tom Keane Perpetual Cup
- No. of teams: 16
- Title holders: Keel (1st title)
- Most titles: 11 clubs (1 titles)
- Sponsors: Kerry Petroleum
- Official website: Official website

The Kerry Premier Junior Football Championship (known for sponsorship reasons as Kerry Petroleum County Premier Junior Football Championship and abbreviated to the Kerry PJFC) is an annual Gaelic football competition organised by the Kerry County Board of the Gaelic Athletic Association and contested by the top-ranking junior clubs in the county of Kerry in Ireland. It is the third tier overall in the entire Kerry Gaelic football championship system.

The Kerry Premier Junior Championship was introduced in 2016 following a restructuring of the entire Kerry Gaelic football championship system at all levels.

In its current format, the 16 participating club are drawn into four groups of four teams and play each other in a round-robin system. The four group winners and the four runners-up proceed to the knockout phase that culminates with the Final. The winner of the Kerry Premier Junior Championship, as well as being presented with the Tom Keane Perpetual Cup, qualifies for the subsequent Munster Club Championship.

As of 2026 the competition has been won by eleven different teams.

== History ==
=== Beginnings ===
The Kerry Premier Junior Championship was introduced in 2016 following a restructuring of the entire Kerry Gaelic football championship system at all levels.

== Format ==
=== Group stage ===
The 16 clubs are divided into four groups of four. Over the course of the group stage, each team plays once against the others in the group, resulting in each team being guaranteed three group games. Two points are awarded for a win, one for a draw and zero for a loss. The teams are ranked in the group stage table by points gained, then scoring difference and then their head-to-head record. The top two teams in each group qualify for the quarter-finals and the bottom team in each group advance to the relegation playoffs.

=== Knockout stage ===
Quarter-finals: The 4 group winners and 4 group runners-up contest this round. A group winner will play a group runner-up of another group. The two winners from these two games advance to the semi-finals.

Semi-finals: The four quarter-final winners contest this round. The two winners from these two games advance to the final.

Final: The two semi-final winners contest the final. The winning team are declared champions and are promoted to the Kerry Intermediate Football Championship.

=== Relegation playoffs ===
Relegation semi-finals: The 4 group losers contest this round. The two losers from these two games advance to the relegation finals.

Relegation finals: The two semi-final losers contest the relegation final. The losing team are relegated to the Kerry Junior Football Championship.

=== Qualification ===
At the end of the championship, the winning club qualify to the subsequent Munster Junior Club Football Championship.

== Teams ==
=== 2026 Teams ===
Club	Location	Division	Colours	In championship since	Championship titles	Last championship title
Annascaul	Annascaul	West Kerry	Blue and white		0	—
Ardfert	Ardfert	St Brendan's	Black and white		0	—
Ballyduff	Ballyduff	Shannon Rangers	Green and white		0	—
Brosna	Brosna	St Kieran's	Tangerine and white		0	—
Castlegregory	Castlegregory	West Kerry	Green and gold		0	—
Churchill	Tralee	St Brendan's	Green and black		0	—
Currow	Currow	St Kieran's	Red and white	2024	0	—
Dromid Pearses	Dromid	South Kerry	Maroon and white		1	2017
Duagh	Duagh	Feale Rangers	Maroon and gold	2025	0	—
Keel	Keel	Mid Kerry	Blue and white		0	—
Listry	Listry	East Kerry	Green and white		0	—
Reenard	Reenard	South Kerry	Blue and white	2024	0	—
St Patrick’s, Blennerville	Blennerville	St Brendan's	Red and white		0	—
St Senan's	Listowel	Feale Rangers	Blue and yellow		0	—
Tarbert	Tarbert	Shannon Rangers	Red and black	2026	0	—
Waterville	Waterville	South Kerry	Red and white		0	—

== Sponsorship ==
Since 2019 the Premier Junior Championship has been sponsored by Kerry Petroleum. The competition was previously sponsored by Castleisland Mart.

== Trophy and medals ==
The Tom Keane Perpetual Cup is the current prize for winning the championship. Colin McGillycuddy of Glenbeigh-Glencar was the first recipient of the cup when it was presented to him after the 2016 final replay. In accordance with GAA rules, the County Board awards a set of gold medals to the championship winners. The medals depict a stylised version of the Kerry GAA crest.

== Roll of honour ==
=== By club ===
#	Team	Titles	Runners-Up	Winning years	Losing years
1	Na Gaeil	1	2	2019	2016, 2018
1	Ballymacelligott	1	1	2025	2023
1	Gneeveguilla	1	1	2021	2020
1	Firies	1	1	2024	2017
1	Glenbeigh-Glencar	1	0	2016	—
1	Dromid Pearses	1	0	2017	—
1	Beaufort	1	0	2018	—
1	Ballydonoghue	1	0	2020	—
1	Fossa	1	0	2022	—
1	Listowel Emmets	1	0	2023	—
1	Keel	1	0	2026	—
12	St Senan's	0	2	—	2019, 2025
12	Skellig Rangers	0	1	—	2021
12	Listry	0	1	—	2022
12	Ardfert	0	1	—	2024
12	Churchill	0	1	—	2026

=== By division ===
Division	Titles	Runners-up	Total
East Kerry	3	3	6
Mid Kerry	3	0	3
St Brendan’s Board	1	4	5
Feale Rangers	1	2	3
South Kerry	1	1	2
St Kieran's	1	1	2
Shannon Rangers	1	0	1
Kenmare District	0	0	0
West Kerry	0	0	0
Tralee District	0	0	0

== List of finals ==
=== Legend ===
- Gold – All-Ireland junior club champions
- Silver – All-Ireland junior club runners-up

=== List of Kerry PJFC finals ===
Year	Winners		Runners-up		Venue	#
Year	Club	Score	Club	Score	Venue	#
2026	Keel	0-14	Churchill	0-12	Austin Stack Park	
2025	Ballymacelligott	2-17 (AET) (pens:4)	St Senan's	3-14 (AET) (pens:1)	Austin Stack Park	
2024	Firies	0-16 (AET)	Ardfert	1-11 (AET)	Austin Stack Park	
2023	Listowel Emmets	0-24 (AET)	Ballymacelligott	1-18 (AET)	Austin Stack Park	
2022	Fossa	4-15 (AET)	Listry	0-22 (AET)	FitzGerald Stadium	
2021	Gneeveguilla	0-12 (AET)	Skellig Rangers	0-09 (AET)	FitzGerald Stadium	
2020	Ballydonoghue	3-20 (AET)	Gneeveguilla	3-18 (AET)	Austin Stack Park	
2019	Na Gaeil	3-14	St Senan's	1-10	Austin Stack Park	
2018	Beaufort	4-13 (AET)	Na Gaeil	2-18 (AET)	Austin Stack Park	
2017	Dromid Pearses	0-17 (AET)	Firies	1-11 (AET)	J. P. O'Sullivan Park	
2016	Glenbeigh-Glencar	1-06; 1-16 (R)	Na Gaeil	0-09; 0-12 (R)	FitzGerald Stadium	

== Team records and statistics ==
=== Performances by divisions ===
Division	Titles	Runners-up	Years won	Years runners-up
East Kerry	3	3	2021, 2022, 2024	2017, 2020, 2022
Mid Kerry	3	0	2016, 2018, 2026	—
St Brendan’s	1	4	2019	2016, 2018, 2024, 2026
Feale Rangers	1	2	2023	2019, 2025
South Kerry	1	1	2017	2021
St Kieran’s	1	1	2025	2023
Shannon Rangers	1	0	2020	—

== See also ==
- Kerry Senior Football Championship (Tier 1)
- Kerry Club Football Championship (Tier 1)
- Kerry Intermediate Football Championship (Tier 2)
- Kerry Junior Football Championship (Tier 4)
- Kerry Novice Football Championship (Tier 5)
- Munster Junior Club Football Championship
