= 2005 Kerry Senior Football Championship =

Gaelic football competition

- Dates: 7 May - 13 November 2005
- Teams: 20
- Sponsor: Allied Irish Bank
- Champions: South Kerry (6th title); Declan O'Sullivan (captain); James O'Sullivan (manager)
- Runners-up: Dr. Crokes; Pat O'Shea (manager)
- Relegated: Listowel Emmets

Tournament statistics
- Matches played: 32
- Goals scored: 73 (2.28 per match)
- Points scored: 655 (20.47 per match)
- Top scorer(s): Colm Cooper (5-19)

The 2005 Kerry Senior Football Championship was the 105th staging of the Kerry Senior Football Championship since its establishment by the Kerry County Board in 1889. The draw for the opening round fixtures took place on 4 April 2005. The championship ran from 7 May to 13 November 2005.

South Kerry entered the championship as the defending champions.

The final was played on 13 November 2005 at FitzGerald Stadium in Killarney, between South Kerry and Dr. Crokes in what was their first ever meeting in the final. South Kerry won the match by 0-12 to 1-06 to claim their seventh championship title overall and a second title in succession.

Colm Cooper was the championship's top scorer with 5-19.

== Team changes ==
=== To Championship ===
Promoted from the Kerry Intermediate Football Championship

- Dingle

== Results ==
=== Round 1 ===
7 May 2005 Round 1	Dingle	0-08 - 1-15	An Ghaeltacht	Páirc an Aghasaigh
	C Murphy 0-2, L Óg Higgins 0-2, D Geaney 0-2, P Corcoran 0-1, Kenny Murphy 0-1.		R Mac Gearailt 1-1, D Ó Cinnéide 0-4, C Ó Dubhda 0-2, A Mac Gearailt 0-2, T Ó Conchúir 0-2, T Ó Sé 0-1, R Ó Flatharta 0-1, C Ó Cruadhlaoich 0-1, JJ Corduff 0-1.

7 May 2005 Round 1	Rathmore	1-09 - 1-10	Kilcummin	Rathbeg Grounds
	J Buckley 1-1, M O'Riordan 0-3, D Casey 0-2, MD Cahill 0-2, J Murphy 0-1.		B Brosnan 1-1, DJ Fleming 0-4, M O'Connor 0-2, M McCarthy 0-1, E O'Donoghue 0-1, P O'Donoghue 0-1.

7 May 2005 Round 1	St. Brendan's	1-08 - 3-11	St. Kieran's	Blennerville Grounds
	S Wallace 1-6, C Daly 0-1, G Clifford 0-1.		T McGoldrick 2-4, K O'Sullivan 1-1, P Galvin 0-2, F O'Rahilly 0-1, J Brennan 0-1, S Flynn 0-1, S Scanlan 0-1.

8 May 2005 Round 1	John Mitchels	0-05 - 2-13	Austin Stacks	Austin Stack Park
	E Kelliher 0-2, D Flahive 0-1, O Coffey 0-1, L Kennedy 0-1.		D Long 0-8, K Donaghy 1-1, M Collins 0-3, P McCannon 0-1, W Kirby 0-1.

8 May 2005 Round 1	Kerins O'Rahilly's	2-08 - 0-08	Listowel Emmets	Austin Stack Park
	J O'Connor 1-4, T Walsh 1-0, P O'Connor 0-1, D Moran 0-1, M Fitzgerald 0-1, G Molloy 0-1.		N Kennelly 0-4, B Doyle 0-2, D Galvin 0-1, B Kelly 0-1.

8 May 2005 Round 1	Kenmare	0-16 - 0-17 (aet)	Shannon Rangers	Templenoe Grounds
	A O'Sullivan 0-8, L O'Shea 0-5, F O'Sullivan 0-1, J O'Sullivan 0-1, D Clifford 0-1.		I Blake 0-11, E Mangan 0-2, P Kelly 0-1, B O'Grady 0-1, B Bambury 0-1, J Houlihan 0-1.

8 May 2005 Round 1	Mid Kerry	2-13 - 0-14	West Kerry	J. P. O'Sullivan Park
	K Foley 1-5, D O'Sullivan 1-2, R O'Connor 0-2, D Walsh 0-2, L Sheehan 0-1, D Breen 0-1.		D O'Sullivan 0-6, SF Farrell 0-2, E Kennedy 0-2, A McNamara 0-2, K O'Sullivan 0-1, A Lynch 0-1.

8 May 2005 Round 1	East Kerry	1-09 - 1-08	Feale Rangers	FitzGerald Stadium
	R McAuliffe 1-3, O Favier 0-1, D Daly 0-1, M Murphy 0-1, N O'Mahony 0-1, D O'Connor 0-1, M O'Donoghue 0-1.		P Galvin 1-5, M Conway 0-2, E Fitzmaurice 0-1.

- South Kerry, Laune Rangers, Milltown/Castlemaine and Dr. Crokes received byes to Round 3.

=== Round 2 ===
14 May 2005 Round 2	Listowel Emmets	1-09 - 1-10	John Mitchels	Frank Sheehy Park
	F O'Brien 1-0, Jason Fitzgerald 0-3, E Kelliher 0-2, GD Dennehy 0-2, B Dennehy 0-1, JJ Hegarty 0-1.		N Kennelly 1-1, D Galvin 0-3, B Doyle 0-2, P Buckley 0-1, B Kelly 0-1.

14 May 2005 Round 2	St. Brendan's	1-08 - 1-10	West Kerry	Blennerville Grounds
	G Clifford 1-1, B Poff 0-2, B O'Flaherty 0-1, D Culloty 0-1, M Ferris 0-1, Seán Hayes 0-1, C Daly 0-1.		C O'SUllivan 1-0, D O'Sullivan 0-3, S Farrell 0-2, A McNamara 0-2, S O'Mahony 0-1, A Lynch 0-1, G Farrell 0-1.

15 May 2005 Round 2	Rathmore	3-12 - 0-10	Dingle	Rathbeg Grounds
	MA Kelliher 2-3, M O'Riordan 1-2, J Murphy 0-3, D Casey 0-2, J Buckley 0-1, P McCarthy 0-1.		L Óg Higgins 0-3, K Murphy 0-2, D Geaney 0-2, P Curran 0-1, C Murphy 0-1, M Evans 0-1.

15 May 2005 Round 2	Kenmare	1-12 - 0-13	Feale Rangers	Templenoe Grounds
	M McNally 1-3, L O'Shea 0-4, JJ Brosnan 0-2, F O'Sullivan 0-1, J O'Sullivan 0-1, S O'Leary 0-1.		P Galvin 0-6, A Maher 0-2, E Fitzmaurice 0-1, C Galvin 0-1, E Galvin 0-1, R Galvin 0-1, M Conway 0-1.

=== Relegation playoff ===
17 July 2005 Playoff	Dingle	0-10 - 0-07	Listowel Emmets	Strand Road
	M Evans 0-3, D Devane 0-3, M Kennedy 0-1, B Kelliher 0-1, A O'Neill 0-1, J Flannery 0-1.		B Scanlon 0-5, L Keane 0-1, D Galvin 0-1.

=== Round 3 ===
15 July 2005 Round 3	Austin Stacks	3-07 - 2-10	Kerins O'Rahilly's	Austin Stack Park
	W Kirby 1-0, P McCannon 1-0, D Sayers 1-0, D Long 0-3, M Collins 0-2, P Laide 0-1, K Donaghy 0-1.		M Fitzgerald 2-1, D Quill 0-6, T O'Sullivan 0-1, R Molloy 0-1, T Walsh 0-1.

16 July 2005 Round 3	South Kerry	1-17 - 3-06	Mid Kerry	J. P. O'Sullivan Park
	B Sheehan 0-9, S Courtney 1-0, A O'Sullivan 0-3, R O'Connor 0-2, D O'Sullivan 0-1, J Sugrue 0-1, A O'Connell 0-1.		M O'Connor 2-1, D O'Sullivan 1-0, R O'Connor 0-2, L Sheehan 0-1, K Foley 0-1.

16 July 2005 Round 3	Laune Rangers	0-09 - 1-05	Kenmare	J. P. O'Sullivan Park
	P O'Sullivan 0-3, MF Russell 0-2, L Hassett 0-1, J Lynch 0-1, J Sheehan 0-1, B Gannon 0-1.		P O'Connor 1-4, JJ Brosnan 0-1.

16 July 2005 Round 3	John Mitchels	2-14 - 0-06	East Kerry	FitzGerald Stadium
	M Murphy 2-2, R O'Donovan 0-5, R McAuliffe 0-4, N O'Mahony 0-2, J Cronin 0-1.		Jason Fitzgerald 0-2, J Hegarty 0-2, B Costello 0-1, GD Dennehy 0-1.

16 July 2005 Round 3	Rathmore	2-10 - 1-06	St. Kieran's	FitzGerald Stadium
	S O'Neill 1-1, M O'Riordan 0-4, MA Kelliher 1-0, J Murphy 0-3, A O'Mahony 0-1, J Buckley 0-1.		T McGoldrick 1-0, J McGlynn 0-3, EJ O'Donoghue 0-1, J Downey 0-1, K Brennan 0-1.

16 July 2005 Round 3	Shannon Rangers	1-10 - 0-16	An Ghaeltacht	Stack Park
	E Mangan 0-5, M Boyle 1-0, P O'Connell 0-2, G Dowling 0-2, L Boyle 0-1.		D Ó Cinnéide 0-9, T Ó Conchúir 0-4, R Mac Gearailt 0-1, C Ó Cruadhlaoich 0-1, R Aghas 0-1.

17 July 2022 Round 3	Kilcummin	1-15 - 2-12	West Kerry	Kilcummin Grounds
	DJ Fleming 0-5, SB O'Doherty 1-0, R O'Connor 0-3, P O'Donoghue 0-2, D Dwyer 0-2, E O'Donoghue 0-1, C Lenihan 0-1, M O'Connor 0-1.		D O'Sullivan 1-3, B Hanafin 1-3, S Farrell 0-2, N Sheehy 0-1, B Dorgan 0-1, S O'Mahony 0-1, E Kennedy 0-1.

17 July 2005 Round 3	Dr. Crokes	5-11 - 1-12	Milltown/Castlemaine	J. P. O'Sullivan Park
	K O'Leary 3-1, C Cooper 1-4, A Kennelly 1-2, J Fleming 0-2, E Brosnan 0-1, D Moloney 0-1.		I Twiss 0-7, S Murphy 1-1, D Twiss 0-2, W Harmon 0-1, O Boyle 0-1.

12 August 2005 Round 3 replay	Austin Stacks	2-11 - 0-15	Kerins O'Rahilly's	Austin Stack Park
	D Long 1-2, K Donaghy 1-1, G O'Connell 0-3, D Bohan 0-2, M Courtney 0-2, W Kirby 0-1.		D Quill 0-11, M Fitzgerald 0-2, G Molloy 0-1, E McGrath 0-1.

12 August 2005 Round 3 replay	Kilcummin	3-10 - 3-12	West Kerry	Páirc an Chaisleáin
	SB Doherty 1-1, DJ Fleming 0-4, K O'Donoghue 1-0, M McCarthy 1-0, S McSweeney 0-1, M O'Connor 0-1, D O'Riordan 0-1, K Gorman 0-1, S O'Leary 0-1,		G Farrell 1-3, D O'Sullivan 1-0, S O'Farrell 1-0, B Hannifin 0-2, B Dorgan 0-2, A McNamara 0-2, N Sheehy 0-1, T Farrell 0-1, D Heaseman 0-1,

=== Quarter-finals ===
8 October 2005 Quarter-final	West Kerry	0-12 - 2-04	Austin Stacks	FitzGerald Stadium
	G Farrell 0-5, B Hanafin 0-2, M Ó Sé 0-2, B Dorgan 0-2, N Sheehy 0-1.		D Long 1-3, P McCannon 1-0, G O'Connell 0-1.

8 October 2005 Quarter-final	South Kerry	0-13 - 1-10 (aet)	East Kerry	FitzGerald Stadium
	B Sheehan 0-6, M Fitzgerald 0-3, R O'Connor 0-2, R Keane 0-1, S Fogarty 0-1.		R O'Donovan 1-0, J Crowley 0-2, D Murphy 0-2, M O'Donoghue 0-2, M Murphy 0-1, S Daly 0-1, S Dennehy 0-1, Donie O'Connor 0-1.

9 October 2005 Quarter-final	Dr. Crokes	2-11 - 1-09	An Ghaeltacht	Austin Stack Park
	C Cooper 2-5, K O'Leary 0-2, E Brosnan 0-1, D Moloney 0-1, A O'Donovan 0-1, R Neher 0-1.		D Ó Cinnéide 0-4, R Mac Gearailt 1-0, D Ó Sé 0-1, C Ó Dubhda 0-1, A Mac Gearailt 0-1, M Ó Sé 0-1, B Breathnach 0-1.

9 October 2005 Quarter-final	Laune Rangers	2-11 - 0-09	Rathmore	Austin Stack Park
	MF Russell 1-4, S Foley 1-4, P O'Sullivan 0-2, J Sheehan 0-1.		M Kelliher 0-4, J Murphy 0-2, M O'Riordan 0-2, Damien Casey 0-1.

15 October 2005 Quarter-final replay	South Kerry	1-13 - 0-08	East Kerry	FitzGerald Stadium
	R O'Connor 0-5, R Hussey 1-1, B Sheehan 0-3, S Fogarty 0-2, R Keane 0-1, D O'Sullivan 0-1.		R O'Donovan 0-4, D O'Connor 0-1, M O'Donoghue 0-1, M O'Donoghue 0-1, M Murphy 0-1.

=== Semi-finals ===
15 October 2005 Semi-final	Dr. Crokes	1-10 - 1-10	Laune Rangers	FitzGerald Stadium
	C Cooper 1-6, K Brosnan 0-2, D Moloney 0-1, J Jones 0-1.		P O'Sullivan 1-3, MF Russell 0-3, B O'Shea 0-2, J Sheehan 0-1, C Kelly 0-1.

23 October 2005 Semi-final	South Kerry	1-11 - 1-08	West Kerry	Austin Stack Park
	B Sheehan 0-7, D O'Sullivan 1-0, R Hussey 0-2, S Fogarty 0-2.		D O'Sullivan 1-1, G Farrell 0-3, B Dorgan 0-2, S Farrell 0-1, B Hanafin 0-1.

6 November 2005 Semi-final replay	Dr. Crokes	2-07 - 1-04	Laune Rangers	FitzGerald Stadium
	K O'Leary 2-2, C Cooper 0-2, K Brosnan 0-1, B Moriarty 0-1, J Jones 0-1.		P O'Sullivan 1-1, MF Russell 0-3.

=== Final ===
13 November 2005 Final	South Kerry	0-12 - 1-06	Dr. Crokes	FitzGerald Stadium
	B Sheehan (0-4, 2 frees), M Fitzgerald (0-3), R Hussey (0-2), C O'Connor, Declan O'Sullivan, B Hickey (0-1 each).		C Cooper (1-2, 1 free), D Maloney, E Brosnan, B McMahon, K O'Leary (0-1 each).	Referee: P Lyons (Laune Rangers)

== Championship statistics ==
=== Top scorers ===
Overall

Rank	Player	Club	Tally	Total	Matches	Average
1	Colm Cooper	Dr. Crokes	5-19	34	5	6.80
2	Bryan Sheehan	South Kerry	0-29	29	5	5.80
3	Declan O'Sullivan	West Kerry	3-13	22	6	3.66
3	Dara Long	Austin Stacks	2-16	22	4	5.50
5	Kieran O'Leary	Dr. Crokes	5-06	21	5	4.20
6	Michael A. Kelliher	Rathmore	4-07	19	4	4.75
7	Dara Ó Cinnéide	An Ghaeltacht	0-17	17	3	5.66
7	Declan Quill	Kerins O'Rahilly's	0-17	17	3	5.66
9	Pa O'Sullivan	Laune Rangers	2-09	15	4	3.75
9	Mike Frank Russell	Laune Rangers	1-12	15	4	3.75
9	Gene Farrell	West Kerry	1-12	15	6	2.50

In a single game

Rank	Player	Club	Tally	Total	Opposition
1	Colm Cooper	Dr. Crokes	2-05	11	An Ghaeltacht
1	Ian Blake	Shannon Rangers	0-11	11	Kenmare
3	Kieran O'Leary	Dr. Crokes	3-01	10	Milltown/Castlemaine
3	Tom McGoldrick	St. Kieran's	2-04	10	St. Brendan's
5	Michael A. Kelliher	Rathmore	2-03	9	Dingle
5	Stephen Wallace	St. Brendan's	1-06	9	St. Kieran's
5	Colm Cooper	Dr. Crokes	1-06	9	Laune Rangers
5	Bryan Sheehan	South Kerry	0-09	9	Mid Kerry
5	Dara Ó Cinnéide	An Ghaeltacht	0-09	9	Shannon Rangers
10	Michael Murphy	John Mitchels	2-02	8	East Kerry
10	Kieran O'Leary	Dr. Crokes	2-02	8	Laune Rangers
10	Kieran Foley	Mid Kerry	1-05	8	West Kerry
10	Paul Galvin	Feale Rangers	1-05	8	East Kerry
10	Dara Long	AUstin Stacks	0-08	8	John Mitchels
10	Alan O'Sullivan	Kenmare	0-08	8	Shannon Rangers

=== Miscellaneous ===
- An Ghaeltacht play in the Munster Senior Club Football Championship after winning the Kerry Club Football Championship.
