= 2015 Kerry Senior Football Championship =

Kerry S.F.C.
- Season: 2015
- Champions: South Kerry
- Relegated: Ardfert; St. Michael's/Foilmore; Laune Rangers
- Munster SCFC: Killarney Legion
- All Ireland SCFC: ???
- Winning Captain: Bryan Sheehan (South Kerry)
- Man of the Match: Bryan Sheehan (South Kerry)
- Matches: ???

The 2015 Kerry Senior Football Championship is the 114th edition of the Kerry GAA's premier club Gaelic football tournament for senior graded teams in County Kerry, Ireland. The tournament consists of 20 teams (11 clubs & 9 divisionals), with the winner going on to represent Kerry in the Munster Senior Club Football Championship, unless they are a divisional club. In this case, the winner of the Kerry Club Football Championship will represent the county. The championship has a back-door format for the first two rounds before proceeding to a knock-out format. Generally, any team to lose two matches will be knocked out of the championship.

Austin Stacks were the defending champions after they defeated Mid Kerry after a replay in the previous years final, however they lost their crown when losing to Dr. Crokes at the third round stage.

This was Ardfert's return to the senior grade after claiming the 2014 Kerry Intermediate Football Championship title (They also claimed the 2014 Munster Intermediate Club Football Championship and the 2015 All-Ireland Intermediate Club Football Championship. For this year they didn't supply players to the St. Brendan's divisional side.

On 22 November 2015 South Kerry claimed their 10th S.F.C. title (their first since 2009) when they defeated Killarney Legion 1–13 to 1-12 after extra time and a replay in Fitzgerald Stadium Killarney. Kerry player Bryan Sheehan raised the Bishop Moynihan Cup for South Kerry and he also claimed the 'Man of the Match' award.

- Ardfert made the straight drop back to the I.F.C. for 2016 after spending just 1 year in the senior grade. For next years S.F.C. they will supply players to the St. Brendan's divisional side once more. - St. Michael's/Foilmore were also relegated to the Intermediate grade after 7 years in the top flight. For next years S.F.C. they will supply players to the South Kerry divisional side. - Laune Rangers were demoted to the middle grade after operating as a senior side for 46 years, an era which included 4 Kerry titles, 1 Munster and 1 All-Ireland title.

== Format Change ==
At the start of the year it was proposed by the Kerry County Committee that the number of Club teams in the Senior Championship be reduced from 11 to 9. This means that three clubs will be relegated from the senior grade in 2015 while the 2015 Intermediate champions will not be promoted to the senior grade for 2016. It was decided that if a club team(s) got to the final of the S.F.C. they would be exempt from the relegation process (Killarney Legion). It was also decided that the finalists of the Kerry Club Football Championship would be safe from relegation (Dr. Crokes & Dingle). Hence the number of teams competing in the S.F.C. in 2016 will be 17.

== Team changes ==
The following teams have changed division since the 2014 championship season.

=== To S.F.C. ===
Promoted from 2014 Kerry I.F.C.

- Ardfert - (Intermediate Champions)

=== From S.F.C. ===
Relegated to 2015 Kerry I.F.C.

- Currow

== Participating teams ==
The teams taking part in the 2015 Kerry Senior Football Championship are:

Team	Team Location	Club/Divisional	Club's Divisional Side
Ardfert	Ardfert	Club	St. Brendan's
Austin Stacks	Tralee	Club	St. Brendan's
Dingle	Dingle	Club	West Kerry
Dr. Crokes	Killarney	Club	East Kerry
East Kerry	x	Divisional (Firies, Fossa, Glenflesk, Gneevguilla, Listry, Spa, St. Patrick's)	x
Feale Rangers	x	Divisional (Clounmacon, Duagh, Finuge, Listowel Emmets, Moyvane, St. Senan's)	x
Kenmare District	x	Divisional (Templenoe, Kenmare Shamrocks, Tousist, Kilgarvan)	x
Kerins O'Rahillys	Tralee	Club	St. Brendan's
Killarney Legion	Killarney	Club	East Kerry
Kilcummin	Kilcummin	Club	East Kerry
Laune Rangers	Killorglin	Club	Mid Kerry
Mid Kerry	x	Divisional (Beaufort, Cromane, Glenbeigh-Glencar, Keel)	x
Milltown/Castlemaine	Milltown	Club	Mid Kerry
Rathmore	Rathmore	Club	East Kerry
Shannon Rangers	x	Divisional (Asdee, Ballydonoghue, Ballyduff, Ballylongford, Beale, Tarbert)	x
South Kerry	x	Divisional (Derrynane, Dromid Pearses, Renard, Skellig Rangers, Sneem, St. Mary's, Valentia Young Islanders, Waterville)	x
St. Brendan's	x	Divisional (Churchill, John Mitchell's, Na Gaeil, St. Patrick's Blennerville)	x
St. Kieran's	x	Divisional (Ballymacelligott, Brosna, Castleisland Desmonds, Cordal, Currow, Knocknagoshel, Scartaglin)	x
St. Michael's/Foilmore	Ballinskelligs	Club	South Kerry
West Kerry	x	Divisional (An Ghaeltacht, Annascaul, Castlegregory, Lispole)	x

== Results ==
=== Round 1 ===
All 20 clubs enter at this stage. Winners proceed to Round 3 while losers must play in Round 2.

23 May 2015
Round 1

Austin Stacks	1-13 - 2-6	St. Michael's/Foilmore

Austin Stack Park

23 May 2015
Round 1

East Kerry	3-17 - 0-8	Ardfert

Austin Stack Park

23 May 2015
Round 1

Rathmore	2-8 - 2-5	Kerins O'Rahilly's

Austin Stack Park

23 May 2015
Round 1

Shannon Rangers	0-9 - 2-16	Dr. Crokes

Tarbert

23 May 2015
Round 1

St. Kieran's	2-10 - 0-8	Feale Rangers

Cordal

24 May 2015
Round 1

Mid Kerry	0-14 - 1-13	Killarney Legion

Killorglin

24 May 2015
Round 1

Kenmare District	5-15 - 0-8	St. Brendan's

Kenmare

24 May 2015
Round 1

Kilcummin	1-8 - 0-16	South Kerry

Kilcummin

24 May 2015
Round 1

Laune Rangers	1-14 - 0-16	West Kerry

Killorglin

24 May 2015
Round 1

Milltown/Castlemaine	1-13 - 1-13	Dingle

Milltown

30 May 2015
Round 1 replay

Dingle	2-4 - 1-4	Milltown/Castlemaine

Dingle

=== Round 2 ===
10 losers from Round 1 play against each other in this round. The winners of this round proceed to Round 3.

30 May 2015
Round 2

St. Michael's/Foilmore	2-9 - 2-10	Kilcummin

Foilmore

20 June 2015
Round 2

Feale Rangers	3-9 - 1-11	Ardfert

Listowel

20 June 2015
Round 2

Shannon Rangers	1-20 - 2-14	St. Brendan's

Listowel

27 September 2015
Round 2

Kerins O'Rahilly's	0-20 - 1-14	Milltown/Castlemaine

Strand Road

3 October 2015
Round 2

Mid Kerry	1-12 - 1-17	West Kerry

Beaufort

=== Round 3 ===
The 5 Round 2 winners join the 10 Round 1 winners in this round. One of these clubs receive a bye to the quarter-finals.

3 October 2015
Round 3

Kerins O'Rahilly's	4-19 - 2-8	East Kerry

Strand Road

3 October 2015
Round 3

Kilcummin	1-13 - 1-10	St. Kieran's

Kilcummin

3 October 2015
Round 3

Shannon Rangers	3-14 - 4-15	Rathmore

Tarbert

4 October 2015
Round 3

Killarney Legion	2-10 - 1-11	Feale Rangers

Fitzgerald Stadium

4 October 2015
Round 3

Dingle	0-14 - 1-14	South Kerry

Dingle

4 October 2015
Round 3

Kenmare District	3-15 - 0-9	Laune Rangers

Kenmare

4 October 2015
Round 3

Dr. Crokes	1-11 - 1-10	Austin Stacks

Fitzgerald Stadium

Round 3

West Kerry	-	Bye

=== Quarter-finals ===
10 October 2015
3:00pm
Quarter-Final

Kilcummin	1-8 - 0-14	South Kerry

Fitzgerald Stadium

10 October 2015
4:30pm
Quarter-Final

Killarney Legion	4-9 - 1-15	Kerins O'Rahilly's

Fitzgerald Stadium

11 October 2015
1:30pm
Quarter-Final

West Kerry	0-11 - 1-15	Kenmare District

Fitzgerald Stadium

11 October 2015
3:00pm
Quarter-Final

Rathmore	2-15 - 1-13	Dr. Crokes

Fitzgerald Stadium

=== Semi-finals ===
18 October 2015
15:45
Semi-Final

Killarney Legion	1-12 - 1-9	Rathmore

Fitzgerald Stadium

25 October 2015
14:30
Semi-Final

South Kerry	0-12 - 0-11	Kenmare District

Fitzgerald Stadium

=== Final ===
8 November 2015
15:00
Final

South Kerry	0-9 - 0-9	Killarney Legion

Fitzgerald Stadium
Referee: Seamus Mulvihill (St. Senan's)

22 November 2015
14:30
Final

South Kerry	1-13 - 1-12 (AET) (a.e.t.)	Killarney Legion
B Sheehan (1-5, 0-2 frees, 0-1 ‘45); A Walsh (0-3); D Daly (0-2, 1 free); P O’Donoghue, C O’Shea, K Young (0-1 each).	Report	J O’Sullivan (1-0); C Keane (0-5, 4 frees); J O’Donoghue (0-3, frees); P O’Connor (0-2); T Moriarty, B McGuire (0-1 each).

Fitzgerald Stadium
Referee: Paul Hayes (Cork)

== Relegation playoff ==
All club teams who did not reach either the S.F.C. final or the Club Football Championship final take place in the Relegation Playoff. Hence, Killarney Legion, Dr. Crokes and Dingle are exempt from this process.

=== Round 1 ===
All 8 clubs enter the Relegation Playoff in Round 1. The 4 winners will earn a place in the 2016 Kerry S.F.C. while the 4 losers proceed to Round 2.

7 November 2015
1:00pm
Round 1

Milltown Castlemaine	2-9 - 2-6	Austin Stacks

Castleisland

7 November 2015
2:30pm
Round 1

Kerins O'Rahilly's	1-12 - 0-9	Laune Rangers

Castleisland

7 November 2015
2.30pm
Round 1

Kilcummin	3-12 - 3-7	St. Michael's/Foilmore

Killorglin

7 November 2015
2.30pm
Round 1

Rathmore	1-13 - 0-5	Ardfert

Ballymacelligott

=== Round 2 ===
The 4 losers from Round 1 play off against each other. The 2 losers will be relegated to the Intermediate grade for 2016. The 2 winners will enter Round 3.

21 November 2015
Round 2

Austin Stacks	0-15 - 1-2	St. Michael's/Foilmore

Lewis Road, Killarney
Referee: Eddie Walsh (Rathmore)

21 November 2015
14:00
Round 2

Laune Rangers	1-9 - 0-8	Ardfert

Ballymacelligott

=== Round 3 ===
The 2 winners from Round 2 enter this round. The winner will earn their place in the 2016 S.F.C. while the loser will be relegated to the I.F.C. for 2016.

13 December 2015
Round 3

Austin Stacks	2-10 - 1-6	Laune Rangers

Lewis Road, Killarney

== Championship statistics ==
=== Miscellaneous ===
- South Kerry win the title for the first time since 2009.
- Killarney Legion qualify for the final for the first time since 1946.
- The final goes to a replay for the second season in a row.
- Laune Rangers are relegated having been a senior club since 1970
