= 2014 Kerry Senior Football Championship =

Gaelic football competition

- Dates: 24 May - 2 November 2014
- Teams: 20
- Sponsor: Garvey's SuperValu
- Champions: Austin Stacks (12th title); Barry Shanahan (captain); Stephen Stack (manager)
- Runners-up: Mid Kerry; Fergal Griffin (captain); James Sheehan (manager)
- Relegated: Currow

Tournament statistics
- Matches played: 33
- Goals scored: 69 (2.09 per match)
- Points scored: 767 (23.24 per match)
- Top scorer(s): Gavin O'Grady (5-28)

The 2014 Kerry Senior Football Championship was the 114th staging of the Kerry Senior Football Championship since its establishment by the Kerry County Board in 1889. The championship ran from 24 May to 2 November 2014.

Dr. Crokes entered the championship as the defending champions in search of a record-equalling fifth successive title, however, they were beaten by Killarney Legion in round 3.

The final was played on 2 November 2014 at FitzGerald Stadium in Killarney, between Austin Stacks and Mid Kerry in what was their second ever meeting in the final. Austin Stacks won the match by 2-13 to 1-07 to claim their 12th championship title overall and a first title in 20 years.

Mid Kerry's Gavin O'Grady was the championship's top scorer with 5-28.

== Team changes ==
=== To Championship ===
Promoted from the Kerry Intermediate Football Championship

- Currow

=== From Championship ===
Relegated to the Kerry Intermediate Football Championship

- Finuge

== Results ==
=== Round 1 ===
24 May 2014 Round 1	Laune Rangers	1-15 - 0-12	St. Brendan's	J. P. O'Sullivan Park
	MF Russell 0-6, C O'Shea 1-0, P Joy 0-3, P Crowley 0-2, J Sheehan 0-1, J Tyther 0-1, D MacBeth 0-1, S McSweeney 0-1.		D Carmody 0-6, K Hurley 0-3, M Griffin 0-2, A O'Donoghue 0-1.

25 May 2014 Round 1	Milltown/Castlemaine	0-18 - 2-12	West Kerry	Páirc de Búrca
	I Twiss 0-10, C Moriarty 0-3, P Wrenn 0-2, J O'Sullivan 0-2, J McCarthy 0-1.		A Fitzgerald 1-2, E Hickson 1-0, D O'Sullivan 0-3, SM Ó Conchúir 0-3, E Ó Conchúir 0-2, C Ó Muircheartaigh 0-1, J Hickson 0-1.

31 May 2014 Round 1	Currow	1-06 - 0-11	St. Michael's/Foilmore	Currow Grounds
	D O'Shea 1-3, J O'Connor 0-1, M McCarthy 0-1, S Brosnan 0-1.		R O'Connor 0-3, B Kelly 0-3, P Long 0-2, B Smith 0-1, S O'Connor 0-1, D Kelly 0-1.

31 May 2014 Round 1	Dingle	w/o - scr.	Kenmare	Páirc an Aghasaigh

31 May 2014 Round 1	East Kerry	1-19 - 1-16	Killarney Legion	Fitzgerald Stadium
	M O'Donoghue 1-8, DJ O'Connor 0-4, D Roche 0-2, A Garnett 0-1, J O'Leary 0-1, C Horan 0-1, D Aherne 0-1, F Coffey 0-1.		C Keane 0-6, B McGuire 1-1, J O'Donoghue 0-4, D Sheehan 0-1, K Breen 0-1, J Lyne 0-1, T Moriarty 0-1, M O'Sullivan 0-1.

1 June 2014 Round 1	Shannon Rangers	1-11 - 0-13	Kilcummin	Frank Sheehy Park
	P Kennelly 0-6, P O'Grady 1-0, K Mulvihill 0-1, PJ Connolly 0-1, T Joy 0-1, G O'Sullivan 0-1, D Bambury 0-1.		J O'Sullivan 0-6, G O'Leary 0-4, K Gorman 0-1, S McSweeney 0-1, I Devane 0-1.

1 June 2014 Round 1	South Kerry	1-14 - 1-07	Kerins O'Rahilly's	Con Keating Park
	B Sheehan 0-6, C Keating 1-1, B O'Sullivan 0-2, C Gibson 0-1, K Young 0-1, T Curran 0-1, D O'Sullivan 0-1, B Dwyer 0-1.		BJ Keane 1-2, D Quill 0-3, D Moran 0-1, S Walsh 0-1.

1 June 2014 Round 1	St. Kieran's	2-10 - 2-14	Mid Kerry	Castleisland Grounds
	T McGoldrick 0-4, T Hickey 1-0, D O'Shea 1-0, E Walsh 0-3, P Reidy 0-1, A Breen 0-1, K Brennan 0-1.		G O'Grady 1-4, Darran O'Sullivan 1-1, D Walsh 0-3, B Murphy 0-3, G Sayers 0-2, F Griffin 0-1.

1 June 2014 Round 1	Rathmore	0-14 - 0-09	Dr. Crokes	Bishop Moynihan/Tim Lenihan Park
	S Ryan 0-8, M O'Riordan 0-4, E Lawlor 0-1, MA Kelliher 0-1.		D Casey 0-5, B Looney 0-1, K O'Leary 0-1, C Brady 0-1, M Burns 0-1.

1 June 2014 Round 1	Feale Rangers	0-09 - 0-14	Austin Stacks	Frank Sheehy Park
	C Cox 0-7, N Kennelly 0-1, D Sheehy 0-1.		S Carroll 0-8, D Mannix 0-2, G Horan 0-1, S O'Callaghan 0-1, W Guthrie 0-1, D O'Brien 0-1.

4 June 2014 Round 1 replay	West Kerry	1-04 - 0-11	Milltown/Castlemaine	Austin Stack Park
	J Hickson 1-0, SM Ó Conchúir 0-2, E Hickson 0-1, A Mac Gearailt 0-1.		C Moriarty 0-3, D Twiss 0-2, S Murphy 0-2, D Kelliher 0-2, P Wrenn 0-1, D Roche 0-1.

=== Round 2 ===
7 June 2014 Round 2	St. Kieran's	0-17 - 2-13	Killarney Legion	Castleisland Grounds
	E Walsh 0-7, P O'Connor 0-5, A Breen 0-3, T Hickey 0-2.		C Keane 0-9, J Lyne 1-2, T Moriarty 1-1, D Sheehan 0-1.

8 June 2014 Round 2	Dr. Crokes	1-16 - 2-09	Kenmare	Lewis Road
	M Burns 0-5, K O'Leary 1-1, T Brosnan 0-3, C Brady 0-3, G O'Shea 0-1, B Looney 0-1, A O'Sullivan 0-1, M Milner 0-1.		B Crowley 2-1, S O'Brien 0-3, C Hallissey 0-3, S Sheehan 0-1, P Clifford 0-1.

8 June 2014 Round 2	Kerins O'Rahilly's	1-11 - 1-16 (aet)	Feale Rangers	Strand Road
	BJ Keane 1-3, D Quill 0-6, J Savage 0-1, R Molloy 0-1.		C Cox 0-10, N Kennelly 1-2, S McCarthy 0-2, C Mulvihill 0-1, D Sheehy 0-1.

8 June 2014 Round 2	West Kerry	1-21 - 4-12 (aet)	Kilcummin	Páirc an Chaisleáin
	J Hickson 1-8, SM Ó Conchúir 0-8, A Mac Gearailt 0-2, P Ó Sé 0-1, E Kennedy 0-1, J Crean 0-1.		J O'Sullivan 2-5, G O'Leary 2-1, K Gorman 0-2, S McSweeney 0-2, I Devane 0-1, N Duggan 0-1.

28 June 2014 Round 2	Currow	0-13 - 3-13 (aet)	St. Brendan's	Currow Grounds
	M McCarthy 0-4, S Brosnan 0-2, I Somers 0-2, G O'Connor 0-1, J O'Connor 0-1, S Flynn 0-1, K Daly 0-1, P McCarthy 0-1.		I Parker 2-3, K Hurley 1-3, D Griffin 0-3, A Byrne 0-2, F Horgan 0-1, M O'Sullivan 0-1.

12 July 2014 Round 2 replay	Kilcummin	2-11 - 1-16 (aet)	West Kerry	Kilcummin Grounds
	J O'Sullivan 0-4, K Murphy 1-0, J Sheehan 1-0, K McCarthy 0-3, D O'Leary 0-1, K Gorman 0-1, D Maher 0-1, C Teehan 0-1.		A Fitzgerald 0-4, J Crean 0-4, D Ó Súilleabháin 0-4, J Hickson 1-0, S Foley 0-2, C Ó Súilleabháin 0-1, É Ó Conchúir 0-1.

=== Relegation playoffs ===
19 October 2014 Semi-final	Kilcummin	0-07 - 0-12	Kerins O'Rahilly's	Castleisland Grounds
	J O’Sullivan 0-5 (2f), G O’Leary 0-1, K McCarthy 0-1.		J Savage 0-5 (1f), B J Keane 0-2 (1f), T Begley 0-2, G O’Connell 0-1, D Moran 0-1, C Coffey 0-1.

1 November 2014 Final	Currow	0-06 - 0-10	Kilcummin	Lewis Road
	D O'Shea 0-3 (2f), P O'Shea 0-1, S Scanlon 0-1, S Brosnan 0-1.	Report	J O'Sullivan 0-3 (3f), G O Leary 0-2, B Kealy 0-1 ('45'), S McSweeney 0-1, C O'Leary 0-1, N Duggan 0-1.

=== Round 3 ===
12 July 2014 Round 3	St. Brendan's	0-09 - 2-09	Dingle	Austin Stack Park
	K Hurley 0-4, M Brosnan 0-1, D Griffin 0-1, A O'Donoghue 0-1, J Dowling 0-1, B Costello 0-1.		P Geaney 1-5, M Ó Flatharta 1-1, M Mac Eibhrí 0-1, C Geaney 0-1, B Ó Ceilleachair 0-1.

12 July 2014 Round 3	South Kerry	1-10 - 0-09	Milltown/Castlemaine	Con Keating Park
	B Sheehan 0-4, I Galvin 1-0, C Keating 0-3, B Dwyer 0-1, Farley 0-1, K Young 0-1.		I Twiss 0-3, D Twiss 0-3, S Murphy 0-2, M Mangan 0-1.

12 July 2014 Round 3	Austin Stacks	0-17 - 2-05	Rathmore	Austin Stack Park
	S Carroll 0-7, D Mannix 0-3, W Guthrie 0-2, P McCarthy 0-2, F Mangan 0-1, S O'Callaghan 0-1, D Long 0-1.		E Lawlor 1-2, G O'Keeffe 1-0, M O'Riordan 0-2, A O'Mahony 0-1.

13 July 2014 Round 3	Shannon Rangers	2-12 - 0-12	St. Michael's/Foilmore	Ballylongford Grounds
	P Kennelly 1-2, K Mulvihill 0-4, M Boyle 1-0, G O'Gorman 0-3, A Lanigan 0-2, G O'Sullivan 0-1.		B Kelly 0-5, D Kelly 0-2, R O'Connor 0-2, S O'Sullivan 0-1, S O'Shea 0-1, P King 0-1.

13 July 2014 Round 3	Feale Rangers	2-05 - 2-12	Mid Kerry	Ballylongford Grounds
	N Kennelly 1-1, D Walsh 1-0, B Murphy 0-3, S McCarthy 0-1.		G O'Grady 1-7, D O'Sullivan 1-1, G Sayers 0-1, D Walsh 0-1, F Hallissey 0-1, L Carey 0-1.

13 July 2014 Round 3	Dr. Crokes	0-15 - 0-17	Killarney Legion	Lewis Road
	D Casey 0-5, C Brady 0-3, K O'Leary 0-2, J Buckley 0-2, S Doolan 0-1, J Doolan 0-1, M Burns 0-1.		C Keane 0-6, J O'Donoghue 0-5, David O'Sullivan 0-4, Damien O'Sullivan 0-1, B Maguire 0-1.

13 July 2014 Round 3	Laune Rangers	3-13 - 2-15 (aet)	East Kerry	J. P. O'Sullivan Park
	S McSweeney 1-5, MF Russell 0-5, D MacBeth 1-1, P Crowley 1-1, D Costello 0-1.		M O'Donoghue 0-9, D Ahern 1-1, D Lynch 1-0, J O'Donoghue 0-1, DJ O'Connor 0-1, D O'Sullivan 0-1, C Horan 0-1, M O'Shea 0-1.

- West Kerry received a bye in this round.

=== Quarter-finals ===
4 October 2014 Quarter-final	Shannon Rangers	3-11 - 1-09	South Kerry	Austin Stack Park
	P Kennelly 1-9 (0-5frees), P Costello and M Boyle 1-0 each, G O’Sullivan and G O’Gorman 0-1 each.		B Sheehan 0-5 (frees), I Galvin 1-1, C Keating, D Daly and B O’Sullivan (free) 0-1 each.

4 October 2014 Quarter-final	Killarney Legion	2-08 - 2-09	Dingle	Austin Stack Park
	C Keane 2-0, J O'Donoghue 0-4 (0-3 f), D O'Sullivan 0-3 frees, J Lyne 0-1.		P Geaney 0-3 (0-2 f), M O'Connor 1-0, M Flaherty 1-0, C Geaney 0-2, M Geaany 0-2 (0-1 45'), D O'Sullivan & B O'Sullivan 0-1 each.

5 October 2014 Quarter-final	Mid Kerry	2-14 - 1-09	Laune Rangers	Fitzgerald Stadium
	G O’Grady 1-4 (1-2 fr), G Sayers 1-3, D Walsh 0-4, L Carey, S O’Sullivan and Darran O’Sullivan 0-1 each.		MF Russell 0-3 (Frees), R Keane 1-0 (Pen), J O’Shea 0-2, S McSweeney, C Riordan, P Joy and D Costello 0-1 each.

5 October 2014 Quarter-final	West Kerry	0-07 - 0-14	Austin Stacks	Fitzgerald Stadium
	D O’Sullivan 0-3 (2fr), A Fitzgerald, J Hickson (fr), E Kennedy and C Ó Muirceartaigh 0-1 each.		S Carroll 0-7 (6 Fr), S O’Callaghan and M Collins 0-2 each, G Horan, W Guthrie and F Mangan 0-1 each.

=== Semi-finals ===
12 October 2014 Semi-final	Dingle	1-09 - 2-13	Austin Stacks	Austin Stack Park
	P Geaney 1-6, M Geaney 0-1, B O'Sullivan 0-1, M Flaherty 0-1.		S Carroll 0-6 (2 Fr), S O’Callaghan 1-0 (og), D Mannix 0-3 (1 Fr) K Donaghy and M Collins 0-2 each,

12 October 2014 Semi-final	Shannon Rangers	0-07 - 1-12	Mid Kerry	Austin Stack Park
	P Kennelly 0-3 (Frees), B O'Grady, D Culhane, P O’Connell, D Wrenn 0-1 each.		Darran O’Sullivan 1-1, G O’Grady 0-4 (3 Fr), S O’Sullivan 0-2, G Sayers, D Walsh, L Carey, F Griffin and Danny O’Sullivan 0-1 each.

=== Final ===
26 October 2014 Final	Austin Stacks	1-13 - 2-10	Mid Kerry	Austin Stack Park
	S Carroll 0-5 (4fr), K Donaghy 1-1, D Bohane and P McCarthy 0-2 each, S O’Callaghan, D Mannix and M Collins 0-1 each.	Report	G O’Grady 1-5 (0-4fr), D Walsh 1-1, D O’Sullivan, G Sayers and J Long 0-1 each.	Referee: E Walsh (Rathmore)

2 November 2014 Final replay	Austin Stacks	2-13 - 1-07	Mid Kerry	Fitzgerald Stadium
	K Donaghy 1-2, P McCarthy 1-1 (1-0 Pen), M Collins 0-2, D Mannix, S O’Callaghan and D Long 0-1 each.	Report	G O’Grady 1-4 (0-4fr), S O’Sullivan 0-2, L Carey 0-1.	Referee: P O'Sullivan

== Championship statistics ==
=== Top scorers ===
Overall

Rank	Player	Club	Tally	Total	Matches	Average
1	Gavin O'Grady	Mid Kerry	5-28	43	6	7.16
2	Shane Carroll	Austin Stacks	0-33	33	6	5.50
3	Jamie O'Sullivan	Kilcummin	2-23	29	5	5.80
4	Conor Keane	Killarney Legion	2-21	27	4	6.75
5	Paul Kennelly	Shannon Rangers	2-20	26	4	6.50
6	Paul Geaney	Dingle	2-14	20	3	6.66
6	Mike O'Donoghue	East Kerry	1-17	20	2	10.00
8	Jason Hickson	West Kerry	3-10	19	5	3.80
9	Conor Cox	Feale Rangers	0-17	17	2	8.50
10	Bryan Sheehan	South Kerry	0-15	15	3	5.00

In a single game

Rank	Player	Club	Tally	Total	Opposition
1	Paul Kennelly	Shannon Rangers	1-09	12	South Kerry
2	Jamie O'Sullivan	Kilcummin	2-05	11	West Kerry
2	Jason Hickson	West Kerry	1-08	11	Kilcummin
2	Mike O'Donoghue	East Kerry	1-08	11	Killarney Legion
5	Gavin O'Grady	Mid Kerry	1-07	10	Feale Rangers
5	Ian Twiss	Milltown/Castlemaine	0-10	10	West Kerry
5	Conor Cox	Feale Rangers	0-10	10	Kerins O'Rahilly's
8	Ivan Parker	St. Brendan's	2-03	9	Currow
8	Paul Geaney	Dingle	1-06	9	Austin Stacks
8	Conor Keane	Killarney Legion	0-09	9	St. Kieran's
8	Mike O'Donoghue	East Kerry	0-09	9	Laune Rangers

=== Miscellaneous ===
- Currow made their first appearance at senior level.
- Dr. Crokes suffered a first championship loss since 2009.
- The final went to a replay for the first time since 2008.
- Austin Stacks won the title for the first time since 1994.
