= 2009 Kerry Senior Football Championship =

Gaelic football competition

- Dates: 19 June - 1 November 2009
- Teams: 20
- Sponsor: Allied Irish Bank
- Champions: South Kerry (9th title); Stephen O'Sullivan (captain); John Galvin (manager)
- Runners-up: Dr. Crokes; Fionn Fitzgerald (captain); Harry O'Neill (manager)
- Relegated: An Ghaeltacht

Tournament statistics
- Matches played: 31
- Goals scored: 61 (1.97 per match)
- Points scored: 689 (22.23 per match)
- Top scorer(s): Bryan Sheehan (1-33)

The 2009 Kerry Senior Football Championship was the 109th staging of the Kerry Senior Football Championship since its establishment by the Kerry County Board in 1889. The draw for the opening round took place on 16 May 2009. The championship ran from 19 June to 1 November 2009.

Mid Kerry entered the championship as the defending champions, however, they were beaten by Feale Rangers in the quarter-finals.

The final was played on 1 November 2009 at FitzGerald Stadium in Killarney, between South Kerry and Dr. Crokes in what was their third meeting in the final overall and a first in three years. South Kerry won the match by 1–08 to 0–10 to claim their ninth championship title overall and a first title in three years.

South Kerry's Bryan Sheehan was the championship's top scorer with 1-33.

== Team changes ==
=== To Championship ===
Promoted from the Kerry Intermediate Football Championship

- St Michael's/Foilmore

=== From Championship ===
Relegated to the Kerry Intermediate Football Championship

- John Mitchels

== Results ==
=== Round 1 ===
| 19 June 2009 Round 1 | Kilcummin | 1-13 - 0-14 | East Kerry | Kilcummin Grounds |
| | C O'Leary 1-1, D Brosnan 0-4, P O'Donoghue 0-3, K O'Donoghue 0-2, J O'Sullivan 0-1, J Devane 0-1, R O'Connor 0-1. | | M O'Donoghue 0-7, Danny O'Sullivan 0-3, C O'Shea 0-1, J O'Leary 0-1, A Looney 0-1, B Russell 0-1. |

| 19 June 2009 Round 1 | An Ghaeltacht | 0-15 - 1-10 | St. Kieran's | Gallarus Grounds |
| | SM Ó Conchúir 0-5, T Ó Sé 0-3, C Mac Gearailt 0-3, T Ó Conchúir 0-2, R Ó Flatharta 0-1, E Mac Gearailt 0-1. | | J Buckley 1-4, T McGoldrick 0-2, S Scanlon 0-1, P McCarthy 0-1, A Breen 0-1, JJ Murphy 0-1. |

| 20 June 2009 Round 1 | South Kerry | 0-13 - 0-09 | Rathmore | Con Keating Park |
| | B Sheehan 0-6, R Hussey 0-4, P O'Donoghue 0-1, G O'Driscoll 0-1, A O'Sullivan 0-1. | | M O'Riordan 0-6, D O'Sullivan 0-1, E Lawlor 0-1, P Reen 0-1. |

| 20 June 2009 Round 1 | Dr. Crokes | 1-11 - 0-13 | West Kerry | FitzGerald Stadium |
| | C Cooper 1-2, B Looney 0-3, E Brosnan 0-2, K O'Leary 0-1, F Fitzgerald 0-1, G Tucker 0-1, D Casey 0-1. | | C O'Sullivan 0-10, M Fitzgerald 0-3. |

| 20 June 2009 Round 1 | Ardfert | 2-04 - 0-12 | Kenmare | Kilmoyley Grounds |
| | S Wallace 1-3, M Moloney 1-0, D Wallace 0-1. | | P O'Connor 0-6, C Brosnan 0-2, DJ Brennan 0-1, D Cahalane 0-1, S O'Brien 0-1, MT O'Sullivan 0-1. |

| 20 June 2009 Round 1 | Killarney Legion | 3-13 - 1-06 | Shannon Rangers | FitzGerald Stadium |
| | J O'Donoghue 1-8, T Moriarty 2-0, J Lyne 0-2, K Breen 0-1, J McGillicuddy 0-1, K Slattery 0-1. | | N Long 1-1, P Kennelly 0-3, M Boyle 0-1, L Boyle 0-1. |

| 21 June 2009 Round 1 | Kerins O'Rahilly's | 1-10 - 1-12 | Dingle | Austin Stack Park |
| | T Walsh 1-5, BJ Keane 0-3, D Quill 0-1, J O'Connor 0-1. | | D Geaney 1-7, P Geaney 0-4, T Griffin 0-1. |

| 21 June 2009 Round 1 | Mid Kerry | 1-11 - 1-10 | Laune Rangers | Coughlan Park |
| | S O'Sullivan 0-10, S Murphy 1-0, D Walsh 0-1. | | MF Russell 0-6, P Joy 1-1, L Hassett 0-1, S Foley 0-1, S McSweeney 0-1. |

| 21 June 2009 Round 1 | Feale Rangers | 2-17 - 0-07 | St Michael's/Foilmore | Frank Sheehy Park |
| | T Kennelly 1-3, N Kennelly 1-1, P Curtin 0-4, D Galvin 0-3, P Galvin 0-2, E Galvin 0-2, E Fitzmaurice 0-1, M O'Connor 0-1. | | R O'Connor 0-2, E O'Connor 0-2, P King 0-1, D King 0-1, B Kelly 0-1. |

| 21 June 2009 Round 1 | St. Brendan's | 0-06 - 2-12 | Austin Stacks | Kilmoyley Grounds |
| | P O'Donoghue 0-3, D O'Callaghan 0-1, L O'Sullivan 0-1, A Moynihan 0-1. | | D Long 1-4, F Mangan 1-0, M Collins 0-3, S Carroll 0-3, G O'Connell 0-2. |

=== Round 2 ===
| 12 July 2009 Round 2 | Ardfert | 2-11 - 0-19 (aet) | St Michael's/Foilmore | Austin Stack Park |
| | S Wallace 1-7, D Wallace 1-1, S Griffin 0-2, J Egan 0-1. | | R O'Connor 0-6, B Kelly 0-5, S Fogarty 0-3, J O'Shea 0-2, M Thiernan 0-1, E O'Connor 0-1, D King 0-1. |

| 12 July 2009 Round 2 | Shannon Rangers | 2-09 - 1-15 | West Kerry | Tarbert Grounds |
| | B O'Grady 0-4, P Bunyan 1-0, | | C O'Sullivan 1-1, G Farrell 0-4, B O'Driscoll 0-3, M Fitzgerald 0-2, S O'Mahony 0-1, M Ó Sé 0-1, E Hickson 0-1, PJ Foley 0-1, J Hickson 0-1. |

| 26 September 2009 Round 2 | Kerins O'Rahilly's | 1-09 - 2-09 | Laune Rangers | Strand Road |
| | D Moran 1-1, BJ Keane 0-3, T Walsh 0-2, D Quill 0-2, G O'Grady 0-1. | | MF Russell 0-6, S McSweeney 1-2, P Joy 1-0, P Crowley 0-1. |

| 26 September 2009 Round 2 | St. Kieran's | 5-21 - 0-08 | East Kerry | Ballymacelligott Grounds |
| | T McGoldrick 1-5, K Brennan 2-1, J Buckley 1-3, EJ O'Donoghue 1-2, A Breen 0-3, JJ Murphy 0-2, P McCarthy 0-2, E Walsh 0-2, D O'Shea 0-1. | | J O'Leary 0-2, D O'Connor 0-2, D Moynihan 0-1, M Murphy 0-1, F Coffey 0-1, C O'Shea 0-1. |

| 26 September 2009 Round 2 | St. Brendan's | 2-14 - 1-09 | Rathmore | Blennerville Grounds |
| | C Daly 1-1, B Poff 1-1, D Doyle 0-2, A O'Donoghue 0-2, J Costello 0-2, D O'Callaghan 0-2, P O'Donoghue 0-2, L Poff 0-1, S O'Mahony 0-1. | | J Buckley 1-1, A O'Mahony 0-3, M O'Riordan 0-3, E Lawlor 0-1, Paul Reen 0-1. |

=== Round 3 ===
| 3 October 2009 Round 3 | West Kerry | 1-14 - 3-11 | St Michael's/Foilmore | Paddy Kennedy Memorial Park |
| | T Farrell 0-4, C Sillis 1-0, G Farrell 0-3, B O'Driscoll 0-3, S O'Mahony 0-1, E Hickson 0-1, M Fitzgerald 0-1, C O'Sullivan 0-1. | | J O'Shea 2-2, R O'Connor 0-4, A O'Connell 1-0, B Kelly 0-3, B Galvin 0-1, S Fogarty 0-1. |

| 3 October 2009 Round 3 | Kilcummin | 0-09 - 0-12 | Laune Rangers | Kilcummin Grounds |
| | D Brosnan 0-4, J O'Sullivan 0-2, K Gorman 0-2, DJ Fleming 0-1. | | MF Russell 0-4, S Foley 0-3, K Flynn 0-1, G O'Mahony 0-1, S McSweeney 0-1, P Joy 0-1, D Cawley 0-1. |

| 4 October 2009 Round 3 | Kenmare | 0-13 - 2-08 | Feale Rangers | Kenmare Grounds |
| | P O'Connor 0-7, A O'Sullivan 0-5, C Brosnan 0-1. | | N Kennelly 2-7, P Curtin 0-1. |

| 4 October 2009 Round 3 | Dingle | 0-11 - 1-09 | St. Brendan's | Austin Stack Park |
| | P Geaney 0-5, D Devane 0-2, T Garvey 0-2, D O'Sullivan 0-1, CB Moriarty 0-1. | | D Culloty 1-1, D O'Callaghan 0-3, P O'Donoghue 0-2, C Daly 0-1, A O'Donoghue 0-1, J Costello 0-1. |

| 4 October 2009 Round 3 | Austin Stacks | 0-13 - 1-08 | An Ghaeltacht | Austin Stack Park |
| | D Long 0-4, G O'Connell 0-3, P McCannon 0-2, D Clifford 0-2, D Bohan 0-1, M Collins 0-1. | | C Mac Gearailt 1-1, SM Ó Conchúir 0-2, Darragh Ó Sé 0-1, B Breathach 0-1, E Mac Gearailt 0-1, T Ó Conchúir 0-1, M Mac Gearailt 0-1. |

| 4 October 2009 Round 3 | Killarney Legion | 0-10 - 0-16 | Dr. Crokes | FitzGerald Stadium |
| | J O'Donoghue 0-5, T Moriarty 0-3, D Murphy 0-2. | | C Cooper 0-6, D Casey 0-3, K O'Leary 0-2, J Buckley 0-2, D Moloney 0-1, A Kenneally 0-1, J Cahalane 0-1,. |

| 4 October 2009 Round 3 | South Kerry | 0-16 - 0-11 | St. Kieran's | FitzGerald Stadium |
| | B Sheehan 0-10, R Hussey 0-4, Declan O'Sullivan 0-1, Aidan O'Sullivan 0-1. | | J Buckley 0-2, EJ O'Donoghue 0-2, K Brennan 0-2, P McCarthy 0-1, T McGoldrick 0-1, JJ Murphy 0-1, A Breen 0-1, P Reidy 0-1. |

- Mid Kerry received a bye in this round.

=== Relegation playoff ===
| 18 October 2009 Playoff | Killarney Legion | 1-14 - 1-13 (aet) | Rathmore | Kilcummin Grounds |
| | J O'Donoghue 0-8, M O'Sullivan 1-1, J Lyne 0-2, D Murphy 0-1, D Pyne 0-1, T Moriarty 0-1. | | J Buckley 1-0, G O'Keeffe 0-2, P Murphy 0-2, M Reen 0-2, O Lawlor 0-2, P Reen 0-2, A O'Mahony 0-1, S Lehane 0-1. |

| 31 October 2009 Playoff | Rathmore | 0-11 - 1-05 | An Ghaeltacht | J. P. O'Sullivan Park |
| | M O'Riordan 0-4, M Ryan 0-2, J BUckley 0-2, A O'Mahony 0-1, P Reen 0-1, P Murphy 0-1. | | M Mac Gearailt 1-0, M Ó Conchúir 0-2, D Ó Sé 0-1, C Mac Gearailt 0-1, T Mac Gearailt 0-1. |

=== Quarter-finals ===
| 10 October 2009 Quarter-final | Dr. Crokes | 5-17 - 3-08 | St. Brendan's | Austin Stack Park |
| | C Cooper 3-7, A O'Donovan 1-1, E Brosnan 1-0, B Looney 0-3, K O'Leary 0-2, F Fitzgerald 0-1, A Kennelly 0-1, D Casey 0-1, J Doolan 0-1. | | B Poff 1-1, C Daly 1-1, M Griffin 1-1, P O'Donoghue 0-2, D O'Callaghan 0-1, A O'Donoghue 0-1, Liam O'Sullivan 0-1. |

| 10 October 2009 Quarter-final | Austin Stacks | 0-13 - 1-09 | Laune Rangers | FitzGerald Stadium |
| | D Long 0-4, F Mangan 0-2, D McElligott 0-2, D Bohan 0-1, W Kirby 0-1, P McCannon 0-1, G O'Connell 0-1, M Collins 0-1. | | MF Russell 0-6, P Joy 1-1, J Lynch 0-1, P Crowley 0-1. |

| 11 October 2009 Quarter-final | Feale Rangers | 0-14 - 1-05 | Mid Kerry | Austin Stack Park |
| | N Kennelly 0-6, P Curtin 0-4, T Kennelly 0-2, P Galvin 0-1, P Corridan 0-1. | | J McGillycuddy 1-0, D O'Sullivan 0-3, S O'Sullivan 0-2. |

| 11 October 2009 Quarter-final | South Kerry | 1-12 - 1-08 | St Michael's/Foilmore | Con Keating Park |
| | B Sheehan 0-6, R Hussey 0-5, Denis O'Sullivan 1-0, A 'Dash' O'Sullivan 0-1. | | S Fogarty 1-0, B Kelly 0-3, R O'Connor 0-2, B Smith 0-1, D Kelly 0-1, K Grandfield 0-1. |

=== Semi-finals ===
| 18 October 2009 Semi-final | Dr. Crokes | 1-09 - 0-07 | Feale Rangers | Austin Stack Park |
| | D Moloney 1-0, C Cooper 0-3, D Casey 0-2, J Buckley 0-2, K O'Leary 0-1, B Looney 0-1, | | D Galvin 0-2, N Kennelly 0-2, P Curtin 0-1, D Griffin 0-1, J O'Brien 0-1. |

| 18 October 2009 Semi-final | South Kerry | 1-14 - 2-09 | Austin Stacks | Austin Stack Park |
| | B Sheehan 0-7, R Hussey 1-3, K Young 0-1, Denis O'Sullivan 0-1, G O'Driscoll 0-1, I Galvin 0-1. | | K Donaghy 1-2, M Collins 1-0, D Long 0-3, G O'Connell 0-3, W Kirby 0-1. |

=== Final ===
| 1 November 2009 Final | South Kerry | 1-08 - 0-10 | Dr. Crokes | FitzGerald Stadium |
| | B Sheehan 1-4, Declan O'Sullivan 0-3, J Sugrue 0-1. | | B Looney 0-4, D Casey 0-3, C Cooper 0-1, K O'Leary 0-1, J Buckley 0-1. | Referee: G Lynch (Ballinskelligs) |

== Championship statistics ==
=== Top scorers ===
Overall

| Rank | Player | Club | Tally | Total | Matches | Average |
|---|---|---|---|---|---|---|
| 1 | Bryan Sheehan | South Kerry | 1-33 | 36 | 5 | 7.20 |
| 2 | Colm Cooper | Dr. Crokes | 4-19 | 31 | 5 | 6.20 |
| 3 | Noel Kennelly | Feale Rangers | 3-16 | 25 | 4 | 6.25 |
| 4 | James O'Donoghue | Killarney Legion | 1-21 | 24 | 3 | 8.00 |
| 5 | Mike Frank Russell | Laune Rangers | 0-22 | 22 | 4 | 5.50 |
| 6 | Ronan Hussey | South Kerry | 1-16 | 19 | 5 | 3.80 |
| 7 | Dara Long | Austin Stacks | 1-15 | 18 | 4 | 4.50 |
| 8 | Stephen Wallace | Ardfert | 2-10 | 16 | 2 | 8.00 |
| 9 | John Buckley | St. Kieran's | 2-09 | 15 | 3 | 5.00 |
| 9 | Cathal O'Sullivan | West Kerry | 1-12 | 15 | 3 | 5.00 |

In a single game

| Rank | Player | Club | Tally | Total | Opposition |
|---|---|---|---|---|---|
| 1 | Colm Cooper | Dr. Crokes | 3-07 | 16 | St. Brendan's |
| 2 | Noel Kennelly | Feale Rangers | 2-07 | 13 | Kenmare |
| 3 | James O'Donoghue | Killarney Legion | 1-08 | 11 | Shannon Rangers |
| 4 | David Geaney | Dingle | 1-07 | 10 | Kerins O'Rahilly's |
| 4 | Stephen Wallace | Ardfert | 1-07 | 10 | St Michael's/Foilmore |
| 4 | Cathal O'Sullivan | West Kerry | 0-10 | 10 | Dr. Crokes |
| 4 | Seán O'Sullivan | Mid Kerry | 0-10 | 10 | Laune Rangers |
| 4 | Bryan Sheehan | South Kerry | 0-10 | 10 | St. Kieran's |
| 9 | James O'Shea | St Michael's/Foilmore | 2-02 | 8 | West Kerry |
| 9 | Tommy Walsh | Kerins O'Rahilly's | 1-05 | 8 | Dingle |
| 9 | Tom McGoldrick | St. Kieran's | 1-05 | 8 | East Kerry |
| 9 | James O'Donoghue | Killarney Legion | 0-08 | 8 | Rathmore |

=== Miscellaneous ===
- St Michael's/Foilmore make their first appearance at senior level.
- Kerins O'Rahilly's play in the Munster Senior Club Football Championship having won the Kerry Club Football Championship.
