= 2021 Kerry Senior Football Championship =

Gaelic football tournament

2021 Kerry SFC
Tournament details
- County: Kerry
- Year: 2021
- Trophy: Bishop Moynihan Cup
- Sponsor: Garvey's Supervalu
- Teams: 16
- Defending champions: East Kerry

Winners
- Champions: Austin Stacks
- Manager: Wayne Quillinan
- Captain: Dylan Casey

Promotion/Relegation
- Relegated team(s): Legion

Other
- Website: Kerry GAA

The 2021 Kerry Senior Football Championship was the 120th edition of Kerry GAA's premier Gaelic football tournament for senior teams in County Kerry, Ireland. The tournament consists of 16 teams (8 club teams and 8 divisional teams), with the winners representing Kerry in the Munster Senior Club Football Championship if they are a club team. If the winners are a divisional team the winners of the Kerry Club Football Championship represent the county.

The championship usually has a back-door format for the first two rounds before proceeding to a knock-out format; generally, any team to lose two matches will be knocked out of the championship. This year however, due to the COVID-19 pandemic seen the competition employ a straight knockout format.

== Format Structure Change ==
8 club teams and 8 divisional teams (16 in total) will take part in this year's S.F.C.

Kenmare District did not field a team for this year's S.F.C.

Relegation (See below): The club team to be relegated from the Senior County Championship will be the same team to be relegated from the Senior Club Championship (The 8 senior clubs play off against each other in two pools in the Club Championship. The two teams that finished bottom of the Group Pools enter a Relegation Final. This loser will be relegated to the I.F.C. for 2021. Should a club reach the final of the County championship they will be exempt from the Relegation process in the Club championship).

The winner of the 2021 I.F.C. will be promoted to the 2022 Senior County and Club Championships.

== Team changes ==
The following teams have changed division since the 2020 championship season.

=== To S.F.C. ===
Promoted from 2020 I.F.C.

- Spa - (Intermediate Champions)

=== From S.F.C. ===
Relegated to 2020 I.F.C.

- Kenmare District - (defunct)
- Kilcummin

== Participating teams ==
The teams taking part in the 2021 Kerry Senior Football Championship are:

| Team | Team Location | Club/Divisional | Club's Divisional Side |
|---|---|---|---|
| Austin Stacks | Tralee | Club | St. Brendan's |
| Dingle | Dingle | Club | West Kerry |
| Dr. Crokes | Killarney | Club | East Kerry |
| East Kerry | x | Divisional (Firies, Fossa, Glenflesk, Gneevguilla, Kilgarvan, Listry, Rathmore, Kilcummin, Tousist) | x |
| Feale Rangers | x | Divisional (Clounmacon, Duagh, Finuge, Listowel Emmets, Moyvane, St. Senan's) | x |
| Kenmare Shamrocks | Kenmare | Club | East Kerry |
| Kerins O'Rahillys | Tralee | Club | St. Brendan's |
| Spa | Spa | Club | East Kerry |
| Killarney Legion | Killarney | Club | East Kerry |
| Mid Kerry | x | Divisional (Beaufort, Cromane, Glenbeigh-Glencar, Keel, Laune Rangers, Milltown/Castlemaine) | x |
| Shannon Rangers | x | Divisional (Asdee, Ballydonoghue, Ballyduff, Ballylongford, Beale, Tarbert) | x |
| South Kerry | x | Divisional (Derrynane, Dromid Pearses, Renard, Skellig Rangers, Sneem, St. Mary's, St. Michael's/Foilmore, Valentia Young Islanders, Waterville) | x |
| St. Brendan's | x | Divisional (Ardfert, Churchill, John Mitchell's, Na Gaeil, St. Patrick's Blennerville) | x |
| St. Kieran's | x | Divisional (Ballymacelligott, Brosna, Castleisland Desmonds, Cordal, Currow, Knocknagoshel, Scartaglin) | x |
| Templenoe | Templenoe | Club | South Kerry |
| West Kerry | x | Divisional (An Ghaeltacht, Annascaul, Castlegregory, Lispole) | x |

== Results ==
=== Round 1 ===
All 16 teams enter the competition in Round 1. The eight winners proceed to the Quarter-Finals while the eight losers are eliminated.

| 30 October 2021; 15:00; Round 1 | Spa | 0-16 - 1-13 (aet); Legion win 5-4 on penalties | Killarney Legion | Fitzgerald Stadium; Referee: Seamus Mulvihill |
| 30 October 2021; 15:00; Round 1 | Evan Cronin (0-8, 5f), Michael Foley (0-2f), Niall McCarthy (0-2), Cian Tobin (0-2), Dan O’Donoghue (0-1), Dara Moynihan (0-1); | Report | Jamie O’Sullivan (0-4, 2f), Padraig Lucey (1-0), Conor Keane (0-2, 1f), James O’Donoghue (0-2f), Jonathan Lyne (0-1), Eoghan O’Sullivan (0-1), William Shine (0-1m), Billy McGuire (0-1), Rob Leen (0-1) | Fitzgerald Stadium; Referee: Seamus Mulvihill |

| 30 October 2021; 15:00; Round 1 | Feale Rangers | 0-05 - 2-16 | South Kerry | Milltown/Castlemaine; Referee: Donal Casey |
| 30 October 2021; 15:00; Round 1 | Eamon O’Falherty 0-2, Jack McElligott 0-1, Tom McCarthy 0-1, Darragh Lynch 0-1 | Report | Eanna O’Connor 1-5 (0-1f), Daragh O’Sullivan 0-2, Niall O’Shea 0-2 (1m), Ronan O’Shea 0-1, Jack Daly 0-1, Conor O’Shea 0-1, Aidan Walsh 0-1, Dilan Donoghue 1-0 | Milltown/Castlemaine; Referee: Donal Casey |

| 30 October 2021; 17:00; Round 1 | St Kieran's | 0-09 - 1-16 | Kerins O'Rahilly's | Austin Stack Park; Referee: Billy O'Shea |
| 30 October 2021; 17:00; Round 1 | Paul Walsh (0-4, 2f), James Walsh (0-2), Adam Barry (0-2, 1f), Philip O’Connor (0-1), | Report | Jack Savage (1,5, 3f), Tommy Walsh (0-6, 3 marks), Conor Hayes (0-4), Barry John Keane (0-1) | Austin Stack Park; Referee: Billy O'Shea |

| 30 October 2021; 19:00; Round 1 | Austin Stacks | 1-07 - 1-05 | East Kerry | Austin Stack Park; Referee: Brendan Griffin |
| 30 October 2021; 19:00; Round 1 | Joseph O’Connor 1-0, Fiachna Mangan 0-2, Jack O’Shea 0-2, Dylan Casey 0-1, Kieran Donaghy 0-1, Wayne Guthrie 0-1 ‘45’ | Report | Paul O’Shea 1-0, David Clifford 0-2 (f), Paudie Clifford 0-2 (1 ‘45’), Darragh Roche 0-1 (f), | Austin Stack Park; Referee: Brendan Griffin |

| 31 October 2021; 13:00; Round 1 | Templenoe | 1-09 - 0-05 | Shannon Rangers | Fitzgerald Stadium; Referee: Brendan Brosnan |
| 31 October 2021; 13:00; Round 1 | Stephen O’Sullivan 1-2, Brian Crowley 0-2, Gavin Crowley 0-1, John Rice 0-1, Adrian Spillane 0-1, Teddy Doyle 0-1 (f), Colin Crowley 0-1 (f) | Report | Jack Kennelly 0-3 (2f), Michael Foley 0-1, Mark Buckley 0-1, | Fitzgerald Stadium; Referee: Brendan Brosnan |

| 31 October 2021; 15:00; Round 1 | Kenmare Shamrocks | 0-10 - 2-09 | St Brendan's Board | Fitzgerald Stadium; Referee: Jonathan Griffin |
| 31 October 2021; 15:00; Round 1 | Sean O’Shea 0-6 (4f, 1’45), David Hallissey (0-1), Stephen O’Brien (0-1), Tom Murnane (0-1), Paul O’Connor (0-1) | Report | Enda O’Connor (1-0), Liam O’Donnell (1-0), Mikey Kelliher (0-3), Thomas Kearns (0-1), Diarmuid O’Connor (0-1), Daithi Griffin (0-1), Dan Goggin (0-1), Alan O’Donoghue (0-1f), James Duggan (0-1f) | Fitzgerald Stadium; Referee: Jonathan Griffin |

| 31 October 2021; 15:00; Round 1 | West Kerry | 1-03 - 0-13 | Dr Crokes | Austin Stack Park; Referee: Paul Hayes |
| 31 October 2021; 15:00; Round 1 | Éanna Ó Conchúir (1-0), Colm ‘Vegas’ Ó Muircheartaigh (0-1), Cathal Ó Beaglaoich (0-1), Cian O’Grady (0-1, 1 mark) | Report | David Shaw (0-4, 3f), Micheál Burns (0-3, 1f), Johnny Buckley (0-2), Tony Brosnan (0-2f ), Kieran O’Leary (0-2) | Austin Stack Park; Referee: Paul Hayes |

| 31 October 2021; 17:00; Round 1 | Dingle | 1-07 - 0-08 | Mid Kerry | Austin Stack Park; Referee: Eddie Walsh |
| 31 October 2021; 17:00; Round 1 | Conor Geaney 1-3 (0-2f), Paul Geaney 0-3 (1 f), Tom O’Sullivan 0-1 | Report | Jack O’Connor 0-2 (1 ’45, 1f), Cathal Moriarty 0-2, Gavan O’Grady 0-2f, Mike Breen 0-1, Fiachra Clifford 0-1, | Austin Stack Park; Referee: Eddie Walsh |

=== Quarter-finals ===
| 6 November 2021; 17:00; Quarter-Final | Dingle | 0-13 - 2-16 | Kerins O'Rahilly's | Austin Stack Park; Referee: Seamus Mulvihill |
| 6 November 2021; 17:00; Quarter-Final | Paul Geaney 0-7 (4f), Conor Geaney 0-3 (1f), Tom O’Sullivan 0-1. Barry O’Sullivan 0-1, Dylan Geaney 0-1 | Report | Jack Savage 0-6 (4f), Conor Hayes 1-2, Gavin O’Brien 1-1; Barry John Keane 0-3, Tommy Walsh 0-2 (1m), Darragh McElligott 0-1, David Moran 0-1 | Austin Stack Park; Referee: Seamus Mulvihill |

| 6 November 2021; 19:00; Quarter-Final | Legion | 1-09 - 1-17 | St Brendan's Board | Austin Stack Park; Referee: Billy O Shea |
| 6 November 2021; 19:00; Quarter-Final | James O’Donoghue 0-5 (4f), Padraig Lucey 1-0, Conor Keane 0-1, Eoghan O’Sullivan 0-1, Darragh Lyne 0-1, Jamie O’Sullivan 0-1 (f) | Report | Dan Goggin 1-1, Alan O’Donoghue 0-3 (2f), James Duggan 0-3 (1f), Daithi Griffin 0-2, Andrew Barry 0-2, Eoghan O’Brien 0-1 (f), Enda O’Connor 0-1, Jack Barry 0-1, Mikey Kelliher (0-1), Ivan Parker (0-1) | Austin Stack Park; Referee: Billy O Shea |

| 7 November 2021; 12:45; Quarter-Final | Templenoe | 0-06 - 1-22 | Dr Crokes | Fitzgerald Stadium; Referee: Padraig O Sullivan |
| 7 November 2021; 12:45; Quarter-Final | Brian Crowley (0-3,2f), Tadhg Morley(0-1); Colin Crowley(0-1f), Stephen O’Sullivan (0-1f) | Report | Tony Brosnan 1-4 (1-0 pen, 1m, 2f), Brian Looney (0-5); Micheal Burns (0-3), David Shaw (0-3f), Kieran O’Leary (0-2), Jordan Kiely 0-3 (2f), Tom Doyle (0-1) | Fitzgerald Stadium; Referee: Padraig O Sullivan |

| 7 November 2021; 2:45; Quarter-Final | Austin Stacks | 0-14 - 0-06 | South Kerry | Fitzgerald Stadium; Referee: Jonathan Griffin |
| 7 November 2021; 2:45; Quarter-Final | Darragh O’Brien 0-8 (6f), Kieran Donaghy 0-2 (1m), Michael O’Gara 0-1, Armin Heinrich 0-1; Shane O’Callaghan 0-1, Sean Quilter 0-1 (free) | Report | Eanna O’Connor 0-3 (3f), Jack Daly 0-1, Dilan Donoghue 0-1, Killian Young (Renard) 0-1 | Fitzgerald Stadium; Referee: Jonathan Griffin |

=== Semi-finals ===
| 20 November 2021; 5:30pm Semi-Final | Austin Stacks | 2-09 - 1-12 (AET, Austin Stacks win 5-3 on penalties) | St Brendan's Board | Austin Stack Park; Referee: Eddie Walsh |
| 20 November 2021; 5:30pm Semi-Final | Darragh O’Brien 0-6 (3f), Sean Quilter 1-2 (0-1m, 0-1f), Michael O’Donnell 1-0, Brendan O’Sullivan 0-1 | Report | Andrew Barry 0-1, Stefan Okunbor 0-1, Dan Goggin 0-1, James Duggan 0-1 (f), Ivan Parker 1-5 (0-1f), David O’Callaghan 0-1, Thomas Kearns 0-1 | Austin Stack Park; Referee: Eddie Walsh |

| 21 November 2021; 2:30pm Semi-Final | Kerins O'Rahilly's | 0-15 - 0-14 | Dr Crokes | Austin Stack Park; Referee: Brendan Griffin |
| 21 November 2021; 2:30pm Semi-Final | Jack Savage (0-8, 6f, 1 ‘45), Barry John Keane (0-3), Conor Hayes (0-3), Tommy Walsh (0-1) | Report | Tony Brosnan (0-6, 3f), Brian Looney (0-2), David Shaw (0-2, 1f), Kieran O’Leary (0-1), Micheál Burns (0-1), Jordan Kiely (0-1), Shane Murphy (0-1f) | Austin Stack Park; Referee: Brendan Griffin |

== Final ==
| 5 December 2021; 2:00pm Final | Austin Stacks | 0-13 - 0-10 | Kerins O'Rahilly's | Austin Stack Park |
| 5 December 2021; 2:00pm Final | Darragh O’Brien 0-6 (0-5f), Seán Quilter 0-2 (0-1 mark, 0-1f), Joseph O’Connor, Michael O’Gara, Fiachna Mangan, Brendan O’Sullivan, Kieran Donaghy (0-1 mark) 0-1 each. | Report | Jack Savage 0-6 (0-4f), Barry John Keane 0-2, Cormac Coffey, Conor Hayes 0-1 each. | Austin Stack Park |

== Relegation play-off ==
The club team to be relegated from the Senior County Championship will be the same team to be relegated from the Senior Club Championship. The 8 senior clubs are placed into two groups containing four teams during the Club Championship. The teams to finish bottom of both groups will face off in the Relegation Final, with the loser being relegated to the I.F.C. for 2020. Should a club reach the final of the County championship they will be exempt from the Relegation process in the Club championship.

5 December 2021
2:00pm
Relegation play-off

| Dr Crokes | 2-18 - 1-08 | Killarney Legion |
|---|---|---|
| T Brosnan (0-7, 2f), B Looney (1-1), T Doyle (1-0), M Burns (0-3), G O’Shea and J Kiely (0-2 each), D Shaw, G White and D Casey (0-1). | Report | J O’Donoghue (0-5, 2f), C Keane (1-0), R O’Grady (0-2, 1f), C Gammell (0-1). |

Fitzgerald Stadium
Referee: Eddie Walsh

== Championship statistics ==
=== Miscellaneous ===
- Austin Stacks win the title for the first time since 2014.
- Austin Stacks go back level with Dr Crokes at the top of the Roll of Honor with a 13th title.
- Kerins O'Rahillys qualify for the final for the first time since 2008.
- Austin Stacks and Kerins O'Rahillys face each other in the final for the first time since 1936.
- It is a first all Tralee final since 1963.
- Killarney Legion are relegated having been a senior club since 2006.
