= East Kerry Junior Football Championship =

Annual Gaelic football competition

The East Kerry Junior Football Championship is a Gaelic football competition for teams affiliated to the East Kerry division. All 13 clubs in the division are eligible to compete in this championship, they must compete with their 'B'(Junior) team. A 'B' player is defined as any player who is not a member of the Kerry inter-county panel at senior, junior or under-21 level in the current year, or a player who starts on the first 15 of his club's O'Donoghue Cup (East Kerry Senior Football Championship) team in the current year. The competition has been dominated by three teams, Dr Crokes (six wins), Firies (five wins), and Kilcummin (five wins). The winners receive the O'Sullivan Cup.

== Roll of honour ==
Year	Winner	Score	Opponent	Score	Date	Venue/Info
2023	Fossa		Gneeveguilla		29/10/2023	Fitzgerald Stadium
2019	Spa		Rathmore			Fitzgerald Stadium
2018	Kilcummin	1-14	Dr Crokes	1-13	04/09/2018	Spa
2017	Dr Crokes	0-10	Spa	0-09	15/08/2017	Legion
2016	Spa	5-11	Firies	4-07	08/14/2016	Fossa
2015	Rathmore	3-16	Firies	4-07	06/09/2015	Lewis Road
2014	Legion	1-14	Dr Crokes	1-10	23/07/2014	Fitzgerald Stadium
2013	Dr Crokes	3-08	Glenflesk	0-05	25/08/2013	Fossa
2012	Rathmore	1-08	Glenflesk	0-10	26/08/2012	Fitzgerald Stadium
2011	Dr Crokes	1-11	Spa	1-10	07/09/2011	Fitzgerald Stadium
2010	Dr Crokes	0-15	Kilcummin	1-09	27/11/2010	Fitzgerald Stadium
2009	Rathmore	1-08	Dr Crokes	0-10	22/11/2009	Rathmore
2008	Listry	1-09	Kilcummin	0-06	15/11/2008	Farranfore
2007	Cordal	1-10	Dr Crokes	0-10	17/11/2007	Fitzgerald Stadium
2006	Scartaglin	2-08	Listry	0-05	22/10/2006	Fitzgerald Stadium
2005	Glenflesk	---	Legion	---	28/01/2006	Glenflesk Awarded Game
2004	Dr Crokes	2-09	Scartaglin	0-11	09/01/2005	Listry
2003	Currow	1-12	Dr Crokes	0-07	02/11/2003	Fitzgerald Stadium
2002	Gneeveguilla	0-15	Cordal	1-06	20/10/2002	Fitzgerald Stadium
2001	Dr Crokes	1-13	Scartaglin	0-07	19/08/2001	Farranfore
2000	Firies	1-12	Cordal	1-07	26/11/2000	Fitzgerald Stadium
1999	Dr Crokes	3-15	Cordal	2-07	17/11/1999	Fitzgerald Stadium
1998	Dr Crokes 'B'	1-10	Firies	1-09	13/12/1998	Fitzgerald Stadium
1997	Spa 'B'	1-07	Fossa	1-04	30/11/1997	Fitzgerald Stadium
1996	Firies	1-12	Scartaglin	1-07	29/09/1996	Fitzgerald Stadium
1995	Firies	3-15	Cordal	0-08	03/12/1995	Fitzgerald Stadium
1994	Spa	0-13	Firies	1-05	27/08/1994	Fitzgerald Stadium
1993	Kilcummin	2-15	Dr Crokes	3-09	24/11/1993	Fitzgerald Stadium
1992	Kilcummin	2-12	Scartaglin	1-11	13/09/1992	Fitzgerald Stadium
1991	Glenflesk	1-11	Dr Crokes	3-05	27/10/1991	
1990	Gneeveguilla	4-03	Rathmore	0-08	16/02/1991	Kilcummin
1989	Kilcummin	2-07	Rathmore	2-03	05/12/1989	Fitzgerald Stadium
1988	Glenflesk	1-08	Kilcummin	2-04	27/11/1988	Deer Park
1987	Firies	1-08	Spa	1-02	21/02/1988	Spa
1986	Currow	3-05	Cordal	1-05	23/11/1986	Fitzgerald Stadium
1985	Scartaglin	0-09	Gneeveguilla	1-05	17/11/1985	
1984	Dr Crokes	2-08	Scartaglin	0-04	14/10/1984	Farranfore
1983	Kilcummin	0-09	Fossa	0-05	11/09/1983	Fitzgerald Stadium
1982	Dr Crokes	0-09	Cordal	1-02	31/10/1982	
1981	Listry	2-06	Currow	0-07	18/10/1981	
1980	Legion	1-07	Listry	1-05	16/11/1980	Fossa
1979	Firies	1-06	Currow	1-03	04/11/1979	Fitzgerald Stadium
1978	Glenflesk	4-09	Scartaglin	3-03	18/03/1979	Fitzgerald Stadium
1977	Kilcummin	2-20	Spa	5-02	11/06/1978	Fitzgerald Stadium
1976	Cordal	1-06	Dr Crokes	0-06	21/11/1976	Fitzgerald Stadium
1975	Fossa	2-08	Dr Crokes	2-05	24/04/1976	
