= Joe O'Connor (Gaelic footballer) =

Kerry player

Personal information
- Native name: Seosamh Ó Conchubhair (Irish)
- Born: Tralee, County Kerry, Ireland
- Occupation: Sports Brand Manager
- Height: 6 ft 3 in (191 cm)

Sport
- Sport: Gaelic football
- Position: Midfield
Club
- Years: Club
- 2017 - Present: Austin Stacks
Club titles
- Kerry titles: 1 (Senior); 1 (Intermediate)
- Munster titles: 1 (Intermediate)
College
- Years: College
- 2017 - 2021: University of Limerick
Inter-county*
Years	County	Apps (scores)
2021 - Present	Kerry	20 (2-11)
Inter-county titles
- Munster titles: 3
- All-Irelands: 2
- NFL: 3
- All Stars: 1
- *Inter County team apps and scores correct as of championship match played 8 November 2025.

Joe O'Connor (Irish: Seosamh Ó Conchubhair) is a Gaelic footballer. He plays for the Austin Stacks club in midfield and at senior level for the Kerry county team.

== Early life ==
O’Connor played underage rugby with Munster. He was part of a successful Munster Under-18s team in 2016 before concentrating on gaelic football.

== Austin Stacks ==
O’Connor plays for the Austin Stacks club in Tralee, Kerry.

== Kerry ==
=== 2022: Kerry Captain ===
Though he never started a game for Kerry, O'Connor was named senior captain for the 2022 season (replacing Paul Murphy), in a year when Kerry won the 2022 All-Ireland Senior Football Championship Final.

=== 2023: Injury ===
O’Connor missed the 2023 season with Kerry due to an ACL tear suffered in a club match versus Na Gaeil.

=== 2025: Breakthrough Year ===
O’Connor became a mainstay of the Kerry team in 2025. He produced three man of the match performances as Kerry won the first All-Ireland Senior Football Championship played under the new rules created by the Football Review Committee.

O’Connor won his first All Star and was nominated for GAA/GPA Footballer of the Year.

== Personal life ==
O’Connor works as the Munster Area Development Manager for MFC Sports. Joe O’Connor on LinkedIn

== Honours ==
Kerry

- All-Ireland Senior Football Championship
  - (2): 2022, 2025
- Munster Senior Football Championship
  - (3): 2022, 2024, 2025
- National Football League
  - (3): 2021, 2022, 2025

Austin Stacks

- Kerry Senior Football Championship
  - (1): 2021
- Kerry Intermediate Football Championship
  - (1): 2024
- Munster Intermediate Club Football Championship
  - (1): 2024

Individual

- All Star
  - (1): 2025
