= Paddy Batt Shanahan =

Kerry Gaelic footballer (1923–2011)

Personal information
- Native name: Pádraig Ó Seanacháin (Irish)
- Nickname: Batt
- Born: 19 April 1923 Currow, County Kerry, Ireland
- Died: 2 February 2011 (aged 87) Tralee, County Kerry, Ireland

Sport
- Sport: Gaelic football
- Position: Right corner-back
Clubs
- Years: Club
- Currow → Killarney; Castleisland Desmonds
Club titles
- Kerry titles: 2
Inter-county
Years	County	Apps (scores)
1950–1951	Kerry	2 (0–00)
Inter-county titles
- Munster titles: 1
- All-Irelands: 0
- NFL: 0

Patrick Shanahan (19 April 1923 – 2 February 2011) was an Irish Gaelic footballer. At club level, he played with Currow, Castleisland Desmonds and divisional side Killarney, and at inter-county level with the Kerry senior football team.

== Career ==
Shanahan played Gaelic football at club level with the Currow club. He was part of the team that won the East Kerry SFC title in 1945. Shanahan later lined out with the Killarney divisional team and won a Kerry SFC medal in 1949 after a 2-07 to 2-03 win over John Mitchels in the final. He claimed a second successive Kerry SFC medal in 1950, after playing with Castleisland Desmonds in their defeat of Killarney in the final.

At inter-county level, Shanahan first played for Kerry as a member of the junior team in 1949. He claimed a Munster JFC medal that year, before lining out at centre-back when Kerry beat Lancashire to claim the All-Ireland JFC title. Shanahan immediately progressed to the senior team and won a Munster SFC medal in 1950.

== Death ==
Shanahan died on 2 February 2011, at the age of 87.

== Honours ==
Currow

- East Kerry Senior Football Championship: 1945

Killarney

- Kerry Senior Football Championship: 1949

Castleisland Desmonds

- Kerry Senior Football Championship: 1950

Kerry

- Munster Senior Football Championship: 1950
- All-Ireland Junior Football Championship: 1949
- Munster Junior Football Championship: 1949
