= Johnny Crowley (Gaelic footballer) =

Kerry Gaelic footballer

Personal information
- Native name: Seán Ó Crualaoich (Irish)
- Born: County Kerry, Ireland
- Occupation: Garda Síochána
- Height: 6 ft 0 in (183 cm)

Sport
- Sport: Gaelic football
- Position: Forward
Clubs
- Years: Club
- 1990s–2000s: Glenflesk; Bishopstown
Club titles
- Kerry titles: 3
Inter-county
Years	County	Apps (scores)
1995–2004	Kerry	49 (12–53)
Inter-county titles
- Munster titles: 7
- All-Irelands: 3
- NFL: 2
- All Stars: 1

John Crowley is an Irish former Gaelic football forward with the Glenflesk and Bishopstown clubs, East Kerry divisional side and, at senior level, for the Kerry county team.

== Playing career ==
=== Club ===
With the East Kerry team, Crowley won three consecutive Kerry Senior Football Championship titles from 1997 to 1999. With Glenflesk, he won 5 East Kerry Senior Football Championships as well as a Kerry Club Football Championship in 2000. Glenflesk would later qualify for the Munster Senior Club Football Championship final where they lost out to Nemo Rangers. He also spent a year playing with Bishopstown in Cork city, where he lined out in the 2002 Cork Senior Football Championship final when Bishopstown lost out to Nemo Rangers.

=== Schools, minor, under-21 and junior ===
Crowley first played with Kerry in the early 1990s, when he lined out for the county's Vocational Schools team. He won All Ireland titles with them in 1992 following a win over Offaly in the final. He won again in 1993 following a win over Wicklow as the team captain. He also played with the Kerry minor team at this time.

He then moved on to the Kerry Under 21 panel in 1994. Kerry lost out to Cork in the semi-final in what was their only game of the championship. Later in 1994, he joined the county junior team. A 1-point win over Clare gave Crowley his first Munster championship medal. Kerry later qualified for the All Ireland final, where they faced Galway. In the end, Kerry won on a 0–15 to 0–04 scoreline, giving him his first All Ireland medal at junior level.

In 1995, Kerry defeated Clare, Limerick and Waterford and Crowley picked up a Munster Under 21 title. This set up an All Ireland semi-final with Donegal. Two points from Crowley helped his side to a 2–06 to 1–05 win and set up an All Ireland final meeting with Mayo. A 2–12 to 3–09 scoreline meant the sides would have to meet again and Kerry won 3–10 to 1–12 in the replay. While he did not score in the final, he scored 0–11 over the course of the campaign.

== Senior ==
Crowley first appeared for the Kerry senior team during the National Football League in 1995, playing in all of Kerry's games in the campaign. He played his first championship game at right half forward in the opening round of the Munster Championship, scoring a point in a win over Limerick. The next round saw Kerry defeat Tipperary, scoring 7 goals, with Crowley scoring 2–01 to book a place in the Munster final for the first time since 1992. They faced Cork in the final. Cork won by 0–15 to 1–09. Crowley's first season as a Kerry senior saw him finish with a personal tally of 2–02 from 3 games.

1996 saw Crowley struggle with injury, limiting him to only four league games. He scored 1–02 off the bench in Kerry's Munster championship opening round win over Tipperary. He played no part in the semi-final win over Waterford as Kerry set up another Munster final with Cork. Crowley was brought on as a substitute and, despite not getting on the scoreboard, Kerry still ran out 0–14 to 0–11 winners and claimed a first Munster title since 1991. He was back in the starting 15 for the semi-final with Mayo at left half forward. However his first, and many of his teammates, Croke Park outing ended in a 2–13 to 1–10 loss.

Crowley began the 1997 season by appearing in all over Kerry's league games up to the semi-final win over Laois. He played no part in the final as Kerry overcame Cork to take the title. For the third year in a row Crowley's side faced Tipperary, and for the third year Crowley scored a goal against them, once more off the bench. This set up a Munster final with Clare. Once more, Crowley was to make an appearance off the bench, scoring a point in the process, as he picked up a second Munster championship. He played no part in the All Ireland semi-final, as Kerry overcame Cavan. The win meant Kerry qualified for a first All Ireland final in 11 years, where they faced Mayo once more. With Crowley coming off the bench to score a point, Kerry ran out 0–13 to 1–07 winners and, in the process, won a first All Ireland title in 11 years. As well a second Munster and first All Ireland Crowley also scored 1–03 in the three games he played.

Crowley began the year by playing in six of Kerry's league games. He started his first championship game since the 1996 All Ireland semi-final in the Munster semi-final against Cork. Kerry ran out 1–14 to 1–11 winners with Crowley scoring 0–05 from full forward. This set up a Munster final with Tipperary. Kerry ended up winning on a 0–17 to 1–10 scoreline, with Crowley scoring a point. This set up a meeting with the Leinster champions Kildare. Kerry were expected to win and make a second All Ireland final in a row, but Kildare ran out surprise winners on a 0–13 to 1–09 scoreline.

In 1999, Crowley was appointed captain of the Kerry team following East Kerry's county championship win. He started out the season by playing in seven of Kerry's league games, missing out on the Q/F loss to Meath. For the first time since his debut in 1995, he wouldn't face Tipperary in the Munster championship missing out on Kerry's first-round win. He was back for the semi-final win over Clare in a game where he scored 2 goals. This set up another Munster final with Cork. Kerry only managed 4 points, 2 from Crowley, as they lost out on a 2–10 to 2–04 scoreline.

Crowley stated off 2000 by helping Kerry to make the semi-final for the league where they lost out to Meath. In the Munster semi-final he scored a point as Kerry beat Cork on a 2–15 to 1–13 scoreline. This set up, for the second time in 4 seasons, a Munster final date with Clare. 1-03 from Crowley helped Kerry to a 3–15 to 0–08-point win and a fourth Munster title for Crowley. This set up a semi-final meeting with Ulster champions Armagh. In the end the sides finished level on a 2–11 each scoreline, with Crowley scoring a point. In the replay, Kerry won on a 2–15 to 1–15 scoreline after extra time, Crowley once again scoring a point. This set up an All Ireland final with Galway, which ended in a draw with each side scoring 0–14. In the replay Crowley, in what was to be a personal best in an All Ireland final, scored 0–03 as Kerry ran out 0–17 to 1–10 winners, giving him his second All Ireland medal. He also finished with 1–11 from six games.

Crowley only played one league for Kerry in 2001. The opening game against Louth. He was back for the championship opener against Tipperary. Kerry ran out winners by 3–17 to 1–04, with Crowley scoring 1–02. It was the fifth and final goal Crowley would score against Tipperary in the championship. This set up a semi-final meeting with Limerick. In what was only his second time facing the Shannon siders, Crowley's side ran out winners on a 1-15 to 0–10 scoreline, with Crowley scoring 3 points. This set up yet another Munster final with Cork. Kerry were winners in a high-scoring game, winning by 0–19 to 1–13, with Crowley scoring 0–04 from right corner forward. 2001 saw for the first time in the football championship a quarter-final stage. Kerry faced off with Dublin in Thurles. It was the first championship meeting between the two sides since the 1970s and 1980s. The game ended in a draw thanks to a late score from a sideline by Maurice Fitzgerald. Crowley himself finished the game with 3 points. In the replay, 2-02 from Crowley helped Kerry to a 2–12 to 1–12 win. Kerry faced Meath in the All Ireland semi-final, who themselves had needed a replay to overcome Westmeath in their Q/F tie. Meath won on a 2–14 to 0–05 scoreline, a result that was Kerry's heaviest championship defeat. In what was to be Crowley's best individual season, he finished the year with an All Star and 2–15 in six games.

2002 saw Crowley struggle with early-season fitness, only making three league appearances. He was back at full forward for the Munster championship first-round game with Limerick, a game where he scored 0–02 in a 0–14 to 1–07 win, setting up a Munster semi-final with Cork. In low-scoring game, 0–08 a piece, with Crowley scoring a point, the sides would have to meet again. In the replay Cork ran out winners on a 0–15 to 1–09. In a game where Crowley failed to score for the first time in 22 championship games. Kerry faced their first ever All-Ireland Qualifier game and a first game against Wicklow at championship level. For the first time in 20 championship games Crowley would start on the bench, a role he would play for the rest of the year. He came on during the game scoring a point in a start forward 5–15 to 0–07 win. This set up another first championship meeting for Kerry, this time with Fermanagh. Kerry had another comfortable win, this time on a 2–15 to 0–04 scoreline, with Crowley once again appearing off the bench and scoring two points. This set up a meeting with Kildare, who had lost the Leinster final. In the first championship meeting for the sides since Kildare's surprise 1998 semi-final win, Kerry won on a 2–10 to 1–05 scoreline, with a point from Crowley. The win meant Kerry were back in Croke Park for a Q/F tie with All Ireland champions Galway. Kerry won on a 2–17 to 1–12 scoreline, and Crowley appeared off the bench but did not score. This set up a first championship meeting in Croke Park with old rivals Cork. After losing out in Munster, Kerry defeated Cork on a 3–19 to 2–07 scoreline. This set up an All Ireland final with Armagh. Kerry looked to be in control when they led at half time, but an early second-half goal saw the Ulster side claim a first All Ireland on a 1–12 to 0–14 scoreline. Crowley finished the year when he largely played as an impact sub with 0-09 from nine games, six when he appeared as a sub.

Much like the previous few seasons, Crowley would later play a limited part in the 2003 league, appearing in only three games. He started at right corner forward in the Munster championship semi-final and scored 2 points as Kerry ran out 0–25 to 1–10 winners over Tipperary. It was to be his last game against Tipperary, a team he had played six times in championship football. This set up a Munster final with Limerick, a side Crowley had only faced once before. In a close game Kerry ran out 1–11 to 0–09 winners, with Crowley scoring a point off the bench to give him a sixth Munster medal. This set up a Q/F clash with Roscommon. Despite conceding three goals, Kerry ran out 1–21 to 3–10 winners, Crowley once again scoring a point off the bench. Ulster champions Tyrone would be Kerry's opponents in the semi-final. Kerry were overrun for the second year in a row by an Ulster team and beaten for the second time in three years in an All Ireland semi-final, as Tyrone ran out winners on a 0–13 to 0–06 scoreline. Crowley finished the year with 0-04 from four games.

In what was to be his final year at intercounty level, Crowley made six appearances in the 2094 league, his most since 2000. He also won his first League medal, scoring two goals from full forward in the final against Galway. He was full forward for the Munster opener with Clare, when he scored a goal that was to be his last score in a Kerry jersey. He was full forward once again for the semi-final as Kerry over came Cork. Setting up a repeat of the previous years final with Limerick. The sides finished level on a 1–10 each scoreline. Crowley appearing from the bench. He was back at full forward once again for the replay, where despite a slow start, Kerry won on a 3–10 to 2–09 scoreline, giving Crowley his seventh and final Munster medal. He was back on the bench for the QF clash with Dublin in Croke Park and again appeared from the bench in a 1–15 to 1–08 win. For the third time in four seasons, Kerry faced an Ulster side in the latter end of the championship, this time squaring up with Derry. This time, however, Kerry ended up on the right side of a 1–17 to 1–11 scoreline. Kerry faced Mayo in the final in a first championship meeting for the sides since the 1997 final. In somewhat of a surprise, Crowley was picked to start at right corner forward, before being substituted for Mike Frank Russell. Despite not scoring, Kerry won on a 1–20 to 2–09 scoreline, giving Crowley a third All Ireland. In his last season with Kerry, Crowley scored one goal in seven games. Bar the 2002 season, this was the most games he played in a single season.

In an intercounty career that lasted from 1995 to 2004, Johnny Crowley played 46 championship games and scored 12–53. He played a large role in helping Kerry to win seven Munster championships, three All Irelands, and a National League.

=== Provincial ===
Crowley also appeared for the Munster provincial selection in four Railway Cup matches. He was a sub on the team that lost out to Leinster in 1996, but did play in the semi-final with over Ulster. He was full forward the following year as Muster lost by a point to Connacht in the semi-final. He was sub once again as Munster lost out in 98 to Leinster. He was again Full forward in another losing semi-final in 2000 this time to Connacht once more. This was his last game with Munster.

=== International ===
He also played with the Irish international rules teams tour to Australia in 2001. Ireland won the series on a 130 to 105 aggregate scoreline.

Sporting positions
Preceded by Seamus Moynihan	Kerry Senior Football Captain; 1999	Succeeded by Seamus Moynihan
