= Kilcummin =

Kilcummin (from the Irish 'Cill Chuimín', meaning 'church of St. Cummin') may refer to:

- Kilcummin, County Kerry, Ireland, a village near Killarney
- Kilcummin, County Mayo, Ireland, a beachhead and civil parish
- Kilcummin, Queensland, Australia, a rural locality
- Kilcummin GAA, a Gaelic football club in County Kerry, Ireland
