= Mark Moynihan =

Irish Gaelic footballer

Personal information
- Born: Camp, County Kerry

Sport
- Sport: Gaelic football
- Position: Half Forward
Club
- Years: Club
- 1990's–2000's: Annascaul Kilcummin
Inter-county
- Years: County
- 1998: Kerry
Inter-county titles
- All-Irelands: 0
- All Stars: 0

Mark Moynihan is a Gaelic footballer from Camp, County Kerry, Ireland. He played with the Kerry County Board of the Gaelic Athletic Association (GAA) during the 90s. He played minor football with Kerry, but had little success before joining the Under 21 team in 1995 when he won an All Ireland. He also played senior football with Kerry in the National League.

He played his club football with Annascaul with whom he won the County Intermediate Championships in 1992 and 2007; he also won a Munster Intermediate title in 2007. In 2003, he helped Annascaul win the County Junior Championship. He also helped the club to the Kerry Senior Football Championship final in 1993 when Annascaul lost out to Laune Rangers. He also played football with Kilcummin.

He attended college in Waterford IT, and later attended the Garda College. With the Garda College, he played in the 1999 Sigerson Cup final but lost out to Tralee IT as they won a third title in a row.
