= William Kirby (Gaelic footballer) =

Irish Gaelic footballer

Personal information
- Born: Tralee, County Kerry

Sport
- Sport: Gaelic football
- Position: Midfield
Clubs
- Years: Club
- 1993-1995 1995-: Na Gaeil; Austin Stacks
Club titles
- Kerry titles: 1
- Munster titles: 1
College
- Years: College
- IT Tralee
Inter-county
Years	County	Apps (scores)
1997-2001 2004-2005	Kerry	13 (0-02) 13 (0-10)
Inter-county titles
- Munster titles: 5
- All-Irelands: 2
- NFL: 2

William Kirby is a Gaelic footballer who played with the Austin Stacks club and previously with Na Gaeil club in Tralee, County Kerry. He also played with the Kerry senior team winning All Irelands in 1997 & 2004. He also won Under 21 medals in 1995 & 1996. He also won 2 Sigerson Cup medals with Tralee IT in 1997 & 1998. Winning the Barrett Cup with Austin Stacks C team in 2019 is one of his finest achievements.

== Club ==
Kirby first played with the Na Gaeil club in Tralee. He won a Kerry Novice Football Championship with the club in 1994. He also lined out with the St. Brendan's Divisional team in the Kerry Senior Football Championship.

He joined Austin Stacks in 1995 and has had a long career with them. Success was slow coming for Kirby. He lined out in the 2001 Kerry Senior Football Championship loss to An Ghaeltacht. His first success was a Kerry Club Football Championship title in 2003.

== Honours ==
- Barrett Cup: (1) 2019
- All-Ireland Senior Football Championship: (2) 1997, 2004
- National Football League: (2) 1997, 2004
- Munster Senior Football Championship: (5) 1997, 1998, 2001, 2004, 2005
- All-Ireland Under 21 Football Championship: (2) 1995, 1996
- Munster Under 21 Football Championship: (2) 1995, 1996
- Sigerson Cup: (2) 1997,1998
- Munster Senior Club Football Championship: (1) 2014
- Kerry Senior Football Championship: (1) 2014
- Kerry Senior Club Football Championship: (2) 2003, 2016
- Kerry Senior Co. League Division 1: (2) 2011, 2014
- Kerry Senior Co. League Division 2: (1) 2010
