= Din Joe Crowley =

Irish Gaelic footballer

Personal information
- Native name: Donncha Seosamh Ó Crualaíoch (Irish)
- Nickname: DJ
- Born: 1945 Rathmore, County Kerry, Ireland
- Died: 19 February 2016 (aged 70) Birdhill, County Tipperary, Ireland
- Height: 6 ft 0 in (183 cm)

Sport
- Sport: Gaelic football
- Position: Midfield
Clubs
- Years: Club
- Rathmore; East Kerry
Club titles
- Kerry titles: 4
Inter-county
Years	County	Apps (scores)
1967–1972	Kerry	16 (2–14)
Inter-county titles
- Munster titles: 3
- All-Irelands: 2
- NFL: 3
- All Stars: 0

Denis Joseph Crowley (1945 – 19 February 2016) was an Irish Gaelic footballer who played as a midfielder for the Kerry senior team.

Born in Rathmore, County Kerry, Crowley was introduced to Gaelic football in his youth. At club level he lined out with Rathmore, however, it was with divisional side East Kerry that he won four championship medals.

Crowley made his debut on the inter-county scene when he first linked up with the Kerry senior team during the 1967 championship. He went on to win two All-Ireland medals, four Munster medals and two National League medals. He was an All-Ireland runner-up on one occasion.

Crowley was a member of the Munster inter-provincial team on a number of occasions but never won a Railway Cup medal. He retired from inter-county football following the conclusion of the 1972 championship.
