= Pádraig Reidy =

Irish Gaelic footballer

Personal information
- Born: 1986 (age 39–40) Tralee, Republic of Ireland

Sport
- Sport: Gaelic Football
- Position: Left Corner Back
Club
- Years: Club
- 2003–: Scartaglin
Inter-county**
Years	County	Apps (scores)
2006–2011	Kerry	52 (0–0)
Inter-county titles
- Munster titles: 5
- All-Irelands: 3
- NFL: 2
- **Inter County team apps and scores correct as of 28 March 2008 (UTC).

Pádraig Reidy is an Irish Gaelic footballer, who has played with the Scartaglin club and the Kerry county team.

== Underage career ==
Reidy played schools football with St.Patrick's College of Castleisland, and won the 2003 Dunloe Shield. He won two Munster Minor Football Championship medals with Kerry (2003 and 2004), and was a member of the Kerry minor side beaten by Laois in the 2003 All-Ireland Minor Football Championship semi-final and of the team which lost to Tyrone in the 2004 final.

He lined out with the Kerry Under 21's between 2005 and 2007.

== 2005 Kerry Juniors ==
Reidy was a member of the Kerry squad for the All-Ireland Junior Football Championship in 2005, starting at corner-back. Kerry defeated Tipperary GAA in the quarter-final of the Munster Junior Football Championship. They then overcame Limerick GAA in a replay to reach the final. However, Cork GAA, who subsequently won the All-Ireland championship, beat them in the final.

== Senior career ==
Reidy made his National Football League debut in 2006, against Mayo.

He first broke through onto the Kerry team in 2007, playing in that season's National Football League. He made his championship debut against Waterford in the Munster Senior Football Championship on 3 June 2007. He played in the corner-back spot vacated by Tom O'Sullivan, who moved to full-back following the retirement of Mike McCarthy. He won his first Munster Senior Football Championship title after over coming Cork in the 2009 final. Reidy played at corner-back as Kerry beat Cork by 3–13 to 1–09. The victory made him the first Scartaglin player to win a senior All-Ireland with Kerry.

He played in all of Kerry's National Football League games in 2008, including the final loss to Derry.

At a club level, Reidy was a member of the team which won the East Kerry Intermediate championship. As a result, the club qualified for the East Kerry Senior Football Championship proper, reaching the semi-finals and almost beating Dr. Crokes in what was described as a "David and Goliath battle". At divisional level however, Reidy's St. Kieran's sides were knocked out in the second round of the Kerry Senior Football Championship by eventual champions Feale Rangers.

As of 2008, Reidy had retained his number four jersey and was one of the starting corner-backs for Kerry in the 2008 National Football League.
