= Paul Murphy (Kerry Gaelic footballer) =

Irish Gaelic footballer

Personal information
- Native name: Pól Ó Murchú (Irish)
- Born: 2 August 1991 (age 35) Rathmore, Ireland
- Occupation: Accountant
- Height: 1.78 m (5 ft 10 in)

Sport
- Sport: Gaelic football
- Position: Half back
Club
- Years: Club
- 2008–: Rathmore
Club titles
- Kerry titles: 2
Inter-county
Years	County	Apps (scores)
2014–	Kerry	41 (2–14)
Inter-county titles
- Munster titles: 12
- All-Irelands: 2
- NFL: 4
- All Stars: 1

Paul Murphy (born 2 August 1991) is an Irish Gaelic footballer who plays for the Rathmore club and at senior level for the Kerry county team since 2014. He usually plays as a wing back. He has captained Kerry. He won an All Star Award in 2014 and received a nomination in 2016.

Murphy started the 2014 All-Ireland Senior Football Championship Final at right half back and received the man of the match award.

== Honours ==
Rathmore

- Kerry Club Football Championship: (1) 2011
- Kerry Intermediate Football Championship: (1) 2022
- All-Ireland Intermediate Club Football Championship: (1) 2023
- East Kerry Senior Football Championship: (5) 2014, 2015, 2016, 2017, 2024

East Kerry

- Kerry Senior Football Championship: (2) 2020, 2022 (c)

Kerry

- All-Ireland Senior Football Championship: (3) 2014, 2022, 2025
- Munster Senior Football Championship: (12) 2014, 2015, 2016, 2017, 2018, 2019, 2021(c), 2022, 2023, 2024, 2025, 2026
- National Football League: (4) 2017, 2020, 2021, 2022

Individual

- All Star: (1) 2014
- All-Ireland Senior Football Championship Final Man of the Match (1) 2014

Awards and achievements
Preceded by Bernard Brogan (Dublin)	All-Ireland SFC Final; Man of the Match; 2014	Succeeded by Brian Fenton (Dublin)
