= Cordal =

Village in County Kerry, Ireland

- Village
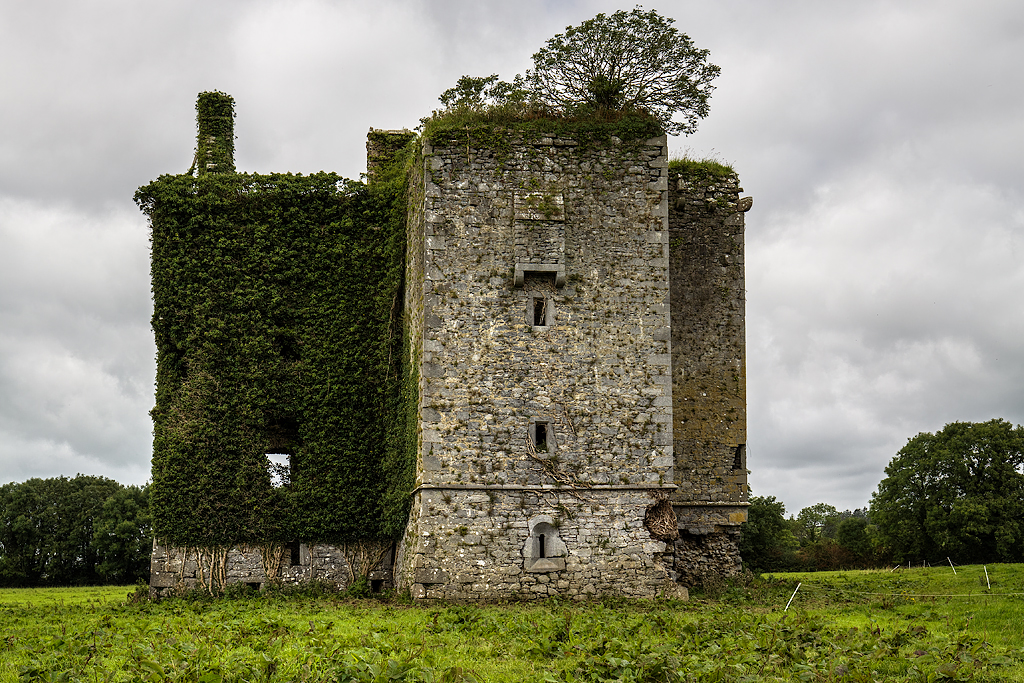
- Kilmurry Castle, north of Cordal village, comprises a 16th century tower house and 17th century fortified house addition

- Location in Ireland
- Coordinates: 52.2181°N 9.3851°W
- Country: Ireland
- Province: Munster
- County: County Kerry
- Irish grid reference: R053082

Cordal (Irish: Cordal) is a village and electoral division in County Kerry, Ireland. The townlands of Cordal East and Cordal West are in the civil parish of Ballincuslane and the historical barony of Trughanacmy. As of the 2011 census, Cordal East and Cordal West had populations of 115 and 117 residents respectively.

== Built heritage ==
Evidence of ancient settlement in Cordal East and Cordal West townlands include a number of ring fort, fulacht fiadh, holy well, ecclesiastical enclosure and standing stone sites.

The ruins of Kilmurry Castle, in Kilmurry townland approximately 1 mile (1.6 km) north of Cordal village, include a 16th-century tower house and a later 17th-century fortified house addition. This castle reputedly gives its name to Ballincuslane parish (Baile an Chaisleáin meaning 'town[land] of the castle').

The local Catholic church (opened 1872) and Church of Ireland church (built c. 1850) are both in Cordal West. The Catholic church, the Church of the Immaculate Conception, is one of three churches in the ecclesiastical parish of Castleisland in the Diocese of Kerry.

== Amenities and sport ==
There is an An Post post office and a public house in the village. The local national (primary) school, Kilmurry National School or Scoil Mhuire, is in Kilmurry townland and had approximately 100 pupils enrolled as of late 2019. The area is served by some limited TFI Local Link bus routes.

The local Gaelic Athletic Association (GAA) club, Cordal GAA, won the East Kerry intermediate football championship in 2023.
