= Rathmore GAA =

Gaelic games club in County Kerry, Ireland

Rathmore
- Cumann Lúthchleas Gael An Ráth Mhór
- Founded: 1888
- County: Kerry
- Colours: Red and White
- Grounds: Rathbeg
- Coordinates: 52°03′53.72″N 9°14′20.91″W

Playing kits
Standard colours

Rathmore is a Gaelic Athletic Association club from Rathmore, County Kerry, Ireland. Together with 12 other football clubs (Cordal, Dr. Crokes, Currow, Firies, Fossa, Glenflesk, Gneeveguilla, Kilcummin, Legion, Listry, Rathmore, Scartaglin and Spa) they form the East Kerry Division of the GAA county of Kerry. Notable players include Paul Murphy, Shane Ryan, Aidan O'Mahony.

Rathmore offer Hurling as well, but they do not play above intermediate level. They play in the Kerry Senior Football Championship. Rathmore GAA was founded in 1888. Their original colours were green. Their former residence was known as the "lawn". The East Kerry board runs its own competitions for clubs within the division. The most important is the O'Donoghue Cup which is awarded to the winners of the East Kerry Senior Football Championship. In 1963 they became the first rural club to win the championship.

The club once played in the Kerry Senior Hurling Championship, making it to the final in 1932 but lost out to Causeway in the final. Now hurling is played at under-age level and in 2022 Rathmore will field a team in the Kerry County Junior Championship.

== Achievements ==
Football

- All-Ireland Intermediate Club Football Championship: (1) 2022
- Munster Intermediate Club Football Championship: (1) 2022
- Kerry County Club Championship (2) 2011, 2026 Runners-Up 2010, 2012
- Kerry County Football League Division 1: (1) 2002
- Kerry Intermediate Football Championship: (2) 1999, 2022
- Kerry Junior Football Championship: (2) 1968, 1998 Runners-Up 1988, 1993, 1996
- Kerry Minor Football Championship: Runners Up 2001 (with Glenflesk)
- East Kerry Senior Football Championship: (9) 1963, 1978, 1984, 2005, 2014, 2015, 2016, 2017, 2024
- East Kerry Junior Football Championship: (3) 2009, 2012, 2015

Hurling

- Kerry Senior Hurling Championship: Runner-Up 1932
- Kerry Junior Hurling Championship: (2) 1987, 2023 Runners-Up 2022

== Ladies Gaelic football ==
Rathmore Ladies club has also followed through the years with the men's club. The ladies decided in the year 2000 that they would go out on their own and not under the men's club anymore. This continued to be a great success for Rathmore winning many challenges throughout the years at all ages.the pat lawlor, the co championship division A 2005 defeat over Castleisland, players including Aoife O'Sullivan, Ashling Desmond, Jacinta Murphy, Noreen and Eileen Murphy, Marie Kelleher, Michelle Knee, Amy Murphy, Sheilann Moynihan, Jodie O Sullivan and many more and many under age levels won.

== Famous players ==
- Din Joe Crowley Two time All-Ireland Senior Football Championship winner.
- Donal Dineen – Irish broadcaster (born 1969)
- Declan O'Keeffe Two time All-Ireland Senior Football Championship winner. Two time All-Star winner.
- Tom O'Sullivan Five time All-Ireland Senior Football Championship winner. Two time All-Star. 2009 All-Ireland Senior Football Championship Final Man of the Match.
- Aidan O'Mahony Five time All-Ireland Senior Football Championship winner. Two time All-Star. 2006 All-Ireland Senior Football Championship Final Man of the Match.
- Paul Murphy Three time All-Ireland Senior Football Championship winner. All-Star winner. 2014 All-Ireland Senior Football Championship Final Man of the Match.
- Shane Ryan Two times All-Ireland Senior Football Championship winner. Two time All-Star winner.
