= East Kerry GAA =

Association of Gaelic games clubs

East Kerry
- Founded: 1925
- County: Kerry
- Colours: Red & white

Playing kits
Standard colours

Senior Club Championships
	All Ireland	Munster champions	Kerry champions
Football:	1	3	9

The East Kerry Board of the Gaelic Athletic Association caters for 13 Gaelic football clubs and 1 hurling club in the East Kerry division of the GAA county of Kerry.

== History ==
=== Early years ===
The East Kerry Board was founded in 1925 following a decision to sub-divide Kerry into a number of divisions. The first chairman and secretary were football legends Dick Fitzgerald and Paul Russell. The first meeting of the new Board was attended by delegates from eight clubs; Currow, Farranfore, Firies, Headford, Kenmare, Killarney, Kilcummin and Killorglin.

In 1931, Ballymacelligott, Cordal, Currow, Farranfore and Scartaglin broke away from the Division and joined with Castleisland to form the Castleisland District League. In 1947, Laune Rangers, Castlemaine, Milltown, Tuogh and Glenbeigh broke away with Beaufort to form the Mid Kerry League.

=== Hurling ===
Legend has it that a hurling game between the Fianna and the Tuatha De Danann took place in the countryside between Fossa and Glenflesk over 1,000 years ago. Legend aside, however, we have to go back roughly ninety years at least for the first mention of an East Kerry side in the County Hurling Championship at senior level at least. In 1910, a Killarney team defeated holders Tralee Mitchells and went on to defeat Kenmare in the semi-final. However, a Kenmare objection stating that Killarney had illegally played players from Kilgarvan was upheld and Killarney was thrown out of the competition. Killarney also took part in 1911 and 1912, and in 1918 a team from Rathmore reached the semi-finals.

In the following decades Killarney took part in the county championship with varying degrees of success as follows:

1920s: Killarney took part in 1928 and East Kerry in 1929

1930s: East Kerry took part in 1930, 31, and 32. Killarney reached the semi-final in 1933 while Rathmore took part the following year, receiving a walkover from East Kerry. Killarney represented the area from 1935 to 1940.

1940s: Teams from the area took part in the early 1940s; however Killarney were back from 1946 to start a 26-year unbroken run in the championship.

1950s: The fifties heralded a very successful period for hurling in the East Kerry area. Under the guidance of Laois man, Ben Campion, Killarney won 3 Minor County Championships in a row between 1950 and 52 and were beaten by Crotta in the senior final in 1951. Building on that base they went on to contest the Senior championship with a greater degree of success. 5 players played in all 3 finals during Killarney's unprecedented run of success winning 3 Co. Minor Championship in a row: Liam Brosnan, Paddy O'Shea, Patrick O'Donoghue and Michael Looney of Dr. Crokes together with Legion's Johnny Culloty.

1960s: Johnny Culloty brought the first All – Ireland hurling medal to East Kerry when he was on the Kerry team that defeated London in the 1961 All Ireland Junior final.

Success at last - Unlucky to be beaten by two points at the quarter final stage in 1968, Killarney took the championship by storm in 1969 defeating Causeway, Kenmare, O'Dorney and Austin Stacks (in the final) to take the County Senior Hurling title for the first and only time completing a Championship double with East Kerry Footballers. Killarney were back in the final the following year defeating O'Dorney and Ballyduff (semi-final) before going under to Kilmoyley in the final with a score of 2–12 to 4–4.

Killarney – 1969 County Champions: The team that defeated Austin Stacks by 2–6 to 2–5 were as follows: Mikey Culloty, Eamonn Fitzpatrick, Bill Moloney, Mickey Culloty, Ultan Breen, Dan Kelleher, Denis Russell, Tadhgie Fleming, Derry Crowley, Brendan Lynch, Tom Prendergast, Johnny Culloty, Pat Lynch, Mick Spillane, Con O'Meara (captain).

1970s: Successive defeats by Ballyduff in 1971 and 72, followed by walkovers to the same opposition in 1973 and to Austin Stacks in 1974 heralded the demise of hurling in the Division. It would be another 17 years before a team from the division would contest the Senior Hurling Championship.

1980s: in 1982 St. Patrick's E.K Hurling Club was set up to cater for hurling in the division.

== Member clubs ==
Football clubs unless stated.

- Cordal
- Dr Crokes (dual club)
- Currow
- Firies
- Fossa
- Glenflesk
- Gneeveguilla
- Kilcummin
- Killarney Legion
- Listry
- Rathmore (dual club)
- Scartaglin
- Spa
- St Patrick's (hurling club)

== Hurling ==
=== Grades ===
Championship	Club
Senior Championships
Senior	None
Intermediate Championships
Intermediate	Dr. Crokes
Rathmore
Junior Championships
Junior	Dr. Crokes (2nd team)

== Football ==
=== Grades ===
Championship	Club
Senior Championships
Senior	East Kerry
Senior	Dr Crokes
Senior	Fossa
Senior	Rathmore
Senior	Spa
Intermediate Championships
Intermediate	Firies
Intermediate	Glenflesk
Intermediate	Gneeveguilla
Intermediate	Kilcummin
Intermediate	Killarney Legion
Junior Championships
Premier Junior	Currow
Premier Junior	Listry
Junior	Cordal
Junior	Scartaglin

== Honours ==
- All-Ireland Senior Club Football Championship
  - Winners (1): 1971
- Munster Senior Club Football Championship
  - Winners (3): 1965, 1968, 1970
- Kerry Senior Football Championship
  - Winners (11): 1965, 1968, 1969, 1970, 1997, 1998, 1999, 2019 2020, 2022, 2023
  - Runners-up (3): 1964, 1967, 1995
- Kerry Under-21 Football Championship
  - Winners (4): 1999, 2018, 2019, 2022
  - Runners-up (6): 2000, 2001, 2005, 2006, 2009, 2015
- Kerry Minor Football Championship
  - Winners (10): 1965, 1996, 2004, 2013, 2016, 2017, 2018, 2019, 2020, 2021
  - Runners-up (1): 1968

== Notable players in the division ==
=== Cordal ===
- Tim Lyons

=== Dr Crokes ===
- Eoin Brosnan
- Johnny Buckley
- Colm Cooper
- Dick Fitzgerald
- Fionn Fitzgerald
- Kieran O'Leary
- Gavin White

=== Currow ===
- Séamus Scanlon
- Mick Galwey
- Moss Keane

=== Firies ===
- Donal Daly

=== Fossa ===
- David Clifford
- Paudie Clifford

=== Glenflesk ===
- Séamus Moynihan
- Johnny Crowley

=== Gneeveguilla ===
- Ambrose O'Donovan

=== Kilcummin ===
- Michael McCarthy
- Brendan Kealy

=== Legion ===
- James O'Donoghue
- Jonathan Lyne
- Brian Kelly

=== Rathmore ===
- Din Joe Crowley
- Paul Murphy
- Declan O'Keeffe
- Aidan O'Mahony
- Tom O'Sullivan
- Shane Ryan

=== Scartaglin ===
- Tom Forde
- Padraig Reidy

=== Spa ===
- Michael Gleeson
- Dara Moynihan
- Mike O'Donoghue
- Paudie O'Mahony
- Donie O'Sullivan

== Divisional competitions ==
=== O'Donoghue Cup ===
The board runs its own competitions for clubs within the division. The most important is the O'Donoghue Cup which is awarded to the winners of the East Kerry Senior Football Championship. Most adult clubs in the division compete for this cup, even if they are playing at junior or intermediate grades. The competition has been dominated by Dr. Crokes.

=== O'Sullivan Cup ===
The East Kerry Junior Football Championship is a Gaelic football competition for teams affiliated to the division. All 13 clubs in the division must compete with their 'B' (Junior) team. A 'B' player is defined as any player who is not a member of the Kerry inter-county panel at senior, junior or under-21 level in the current year, or a player who starts on the first 15 of his club's O'Donoghue Cup (East Kerry Senior Football Championship) team in the current year. The competition has been dominated by 3 teams, Dr. Crokes (6 wins), Firies (5 wins), and Kilcummin (5 wins). The winners receive the O'Sullivan Cup.
