= East Kerry Senior Football Championship =

Annual Gaelic football competition

- Code: Gaelic football
- Founded: 1925; 101 years ago
- Region: East Kerry (GAA)
- No. of teams: 13
- Title holders: Dr Crokes (35th title)
- First winner: Kilcummin
- Most titles: Dr Crokes (35 titles)

The East Kerry Senior Football Championship an annual Gaelic football competition organised by the East Kerry Board of the Gaelic Athletic Association since 1925 for the top Gaelic football teams in the east of County Kerry in Ireland.

The championship currently uses a single-elimination tournament whereby each team is guaranteed one game.

The title has been won at least once by 11 different teams. The all-time record-holders are Dr Crokes who have won a total of 35 titles. As of 2025, Dr Crokes were the title-holders.

Most adult clubs in the division compete for this cup, even if they are playing at junior or intermediate grades. As of the early 21st century, the competition has been dominated by Dr Crokes, who won their thirtieth championship in December 2018. The winners receive the Dr O'Donoghue Cup. The main sponsor for many years is the Gleneagle Hotel in Killarney.

== Teams ==
=== Current teams ===
Club	Location	Colours	Grade
Cordal	Cordal	Blue and Gold	Junior
Currow	Currow	Black and Amber	Junior
Dr Crokes	Killarney	Black and Amber	Senior
Firies	Farranfore	Sky Blue and Navy	Junior
Fossa	Fossa	Red and Black	Intermediate
Glenflesk	Glenflesk	Blue and Gold	Intermediate
Gneeveguilla	Gneeveguilla	Green and Gold	Intermediate
Kilcummin	Kilcummin	Green and Red	Intermediate
Killarney Legion	Killarney	Green and white	Intermediate
Listry	Faha	Green and white	Junior
Rathmore	Rathmore	Red and white	Senior
Scartaglin	Scartaglin	Maroon and White	Junior
Spa	Killarney	Blue and gold	Senior

== Roll of honour ==
#	Club	Titles	Years won
1	Dr Crokes	35	1927, 1956, 1957, 1958, 1959, 1960, 1961, 1962, 1964, 1965, 1968, 1981, 1982, 1986, 1990, 1991, 1992, 1993, 1995, 2000, 2002, 2004, 2006, 2007, 2008, 2009, 2010, 2011, 2012, 2013, 2018, 2020, 2022, 2023, 2025
2	Spa	10	1966, 1969, 1971, 1972, 1974, 1975, 1977, 1985, 1987, 1989
3	Rathmore	9	1963, 1978, 1984, 2005, 2014, 2015, 2016, 2017, 2024
4	Listry	6	1937, 1938, 1939, 1940, 1941, 1970
4	Glenflesk	6	1988, 1994, 1996, 1997, 1999, 2001
4	Killarney Legion	6	1929, 1954, 1955, 1967, 1976, 2019
7	Gneeveguilla	4	1979, 1980, 1983, 2003
8	Kilcummin	2	1925, 1973
8	Currow	2	1945, 1998
10	Laune Rangers	1	1932
10	Headford	1	1948

.

== List of finals ==
=== List of East Kerry SFC finals ===
Year	Winners		Runners-up	
Year	Club	Score	Club	Score
2025	Dr Crokes	1-15	Rathmore	0-16
2024	Rathmore	1-12	Kilcummin	2-07
2023	Dr Crokes	0-12	Legion	1-08
2022	Dr Crokes	1-18	Spa	1-07
2021	Cancelled due to the impact of the COVID-19 pandemic on Gaelic games			
2020	Dr Crokes	3-09	Spa	2-09
2019	Legion	1-18	Dr Crokes	3-06
2018	Dr Crokes	3-24	Kilcummin	1-08
2017	Rathmore	0-11	Legion	0-10
2016	Rathmore	2-12	Dr Crokes	0-13
2015	Rathmore	3-11	Legion	2-07
2014	Rathmore	0-12, 1-11 (Replay)	Legion	1-09, 1-10 (R)
2013	Dr Crokes	1-18	Legion	1-08
2012	Dr Crokes	3-09	Rathmore	2-10
2011	Dr Crokes	0-17	Rathmore	1-09
2010	Dr Crokes	0-11	Rathmore	1-07
2009	Dr Crokes	0-14	Gneeveguilla	0-09
2008	Dr Crokes	0-07	Kilcummin	0-05
2007	Dr Crokes	2-13	Rathmore	0-05
2006	Dr Crokes	3-06	Kilcummin	2-06
2005	Rathmore	0-08	Kilcummin	0-07
2004	Dr Crokes	0-14	Rathmore	0-10
2003	Gneeveguilla	1-11	Kilcummin	0-12
2002	Dr Crokes	0-10	Rathmore	0-06
2001	Glenflesk	0-14	Dr Crokes	1-07
2000	Dr Crokes	0-14	Gneeveguilla	0-11
1999	Glenflesk	0-08	Rathmore	0-07
1998	Currow	0-08	Glenflesk	0-07
1997	Glenflesk	2-06	Currow	0-10
1996	Glenflesk	0-10	Dr Crokes	0-08
1995	Dr Crokes	3-13	Glenflesk	0-06
1994	Glenflesk	2-12	Dr Crokes	1-14
1993	Dr Crokes	2-12	Rathmore	0-13
1992	Dr Crokes	0-15	Currow	0-14
1991	Dr Crokes	1-09	Gneeveguilla	1-03
1990	Dr Crokes	1-10	Gneeveguilla	0-07
1989	Spa	0-08, 1-08 (R)	Gneeveguilla	0-08, 1-03 (R)
1988	Glenflesk	1-06	Spa	1-04
1987	Spa	1-09	Dr Crokes	0-05
1986	Dr Crokes	0-11 (Replay)	Gneeveguilla	0-07
1985	Spa	2-07	Dr Crokes	1-04
1984	Rathmore	1-07	Legion	0-06
1983	Gneeveguilla	1-07	Dr Crokes	0-09
1982	Dr Crokes	1-10	Gneeveguilla	0-07
1981	Dr Crokes	3-08	Gneeveguilla	0-02
1980	Gneeveguilla	3-06, 2-08 (R)	Dr Crokes	2-09, 1-08 (R)
1979	Gneeveguilla	2-06	Dr Crokes	1-11
1978	Rathmore	1-09	Dr Crokes	1-05
1977	Spa	0-10	Dr Crokes	1-05
1976	Legion	2-10	Spa	2-06
1975	Spa	0-08	Gneeveguilla	1-03
1974	Spa	1-10	Dr Crokes	1-07
1973	Kilcummin	2-10, 1-09 (R)	Glenflesk	2-10, 0-07 (R)
1972	Spa	1-12	Dr Crokes	1-10
1971	Spa	1-13	Dr Crokes	0-09
1970	Listry	2-08	Spa	0-07
1969	Spa	0-12	Dr Crokes	0-08
1968	Dr Crokes	4-03	Spa	0-11
1967	Legion	1-11	Rathmore	2-04
1966	Spa	1-08	Kilcummin	1-04
1965	Dr Crokes	5-04	Glenflesk	1-04
1964	Dr Crokes	2-07	St. Finan's	0-04
1963	Rathmore	2-05	Dr Crokes	0-04
1962	Dr Crokes		Legion	
1961	Dr Crokes	2-09	Legion	2-08
1960	Dr Crokes	2-04	Legion	1-02
1959	Dr Crokes	0-09	Legion	0-06
1958	Dr Crokes	0-14	Legion	0-06
1957	Dr Crokes	4-11	Rathmore	1-02
1956	Dr Crokes	1-03	Legion	1-01
1955	Legion	3-06	Dr Crokes	1-02
1954	Legion	1-08	Kilcummin	1-00
1953				
1952				
1951				
1950				
1949				
1948	Headford		Dr Crokes	
1947				
1946				
1945	Currow			
1944				
1943				
1942				
1941	Listry			
1940	Listry			
1939	Listry			
1938	Listry			
1937	Listry			
1936				
1935				
1934				
1933				
1932	Laune Rangers			
1931				
1930				
1929	Legion			
1928				
1927	Dr Crokes			
1926				
1925	Kilcummin			

.

== See also ==
- Kerry Senior Football Championship
- Divisional Championships:
  - Kenmare District Board Senior Football Championship
  - Mid Kerry Senior Football Championship
  - North Kerry Senior Football Championship
  - South Kerry Senior Football Championship
  - Tralee Town / St Brendan's Board Senior Football Championship
  - West Kerry Senior Football Championship
