= Scartaglin GAA =

Gaelic games club in County Kerry, Ireland

Scartaglin
- Cumann Lúchtchleas Gael Scarteach an Ghlainne
- Founded: 1964
- County: Kerry
- Colours: Maroon and white
- Coordinates: 52°11′12.60″N 9°24′53.81″W

Playing kits
Standard colours

Scartaglin is a Gaelic Athletic Association club from Scartaglen, County Kerry, Ireland. Founded in 1964, the club fields teams in the East Kerry Division of the GAA county of Kerry. Players from the club also play in the Kerry Senior Football Championship with the divisional side St. Kierans.

== Divisional teams ==
Scartaglin players play with St. Kierans at senior level as a divisional team in the Kerry Senior Football Championship. Other clubs, which contribute players to St. Kierans' teams, include Ballymacelligott, Brosna, Cordal, Currow, Castleisland Desmonds and Knocknagoshel.

== Achievements ==
- Munster Junior B Club Football Championship (1): 2012
- Kerry Novice Football Championship (3): 1983, 2012, 2019.

== Notable players ==
- Padraig Reidy
