= Bryan Sheehan =

Kerry Gaelic footballer

Personal information
- Native name: Brian Ó Síocháin (Irish)
- Born: 25 August 1985 (age 41) Tralee, Ireland
- Occupation: Quantity surveyor
- Height: 1.9 m (6 ft 3 in)

Sport
- Sport: Gaelic football
- Position: Midfield
Club
- Years: Club
- 2002–: St Mary's
Club titles
- Kerry titles: 5
Inter-county*
Years	County	Apps (scores)
2005–2017	Kerry	66 (6–161)
Inter-county titles
- Munster titles: 9
- All-Irelands: 5
- NFL: 3
- All Stars: 1
- *Inter County team apps and scores correct as of 19 November 2017.

Bryan Sheehan (born 25 August 1985) is an Irish Gaelic footballer with the St Mary's club in Cahirciveen, South Kerry divisional side and, formerly, the Kerry county team. He won five All-Ireland SFC medals (2004, 2006, 2007, 2009, 2014).

== Career ==
Club

At club level, Sheehan lined out successfully with both St Mary's Cahersiveen and South Kerry.

His first major success with St. Mary's was winning a Kerry County Football League - Division 1 title in 2003. He would have to wait until 2010 before he got his next success at county level as the club won the Kerry Junior Football Championship. He later added a Munster Junior Club Football Championship after a win over Limerick side [[Bruree GAA|Bruree]] in the final. He later lined out in Croke Park in the All-Ireland Junior Club Football Championship final. He picked up a winners medal after a win over Cavan side Swanlinbar on a 3-13 to 1-05 scoreline.

His next major success was in 2015 when he won a Kerry Intermediate Football Championship title after a win over Spa in the final. He later added a Munster Intermediate Club Football Championship after a win over Carrigaline He later lead his side to the 2015–16 All-Ireland Intermediate Club Football Championship in Croke Park after a win over Hollymount Carramore.

He has also had much success in the South Kerry Senior Football Championship. Where to date he has won 16 titles.

He also had much success with the South Kerry divisional team. He won five Kerry Senior Football Championship titles from 2004-06, 2009 and as captain in 2015.

== Intercounty ==
Minor

He was part of the Kerry squad for the 2001 to 2003 All-Ireland Minor Football Championships, winning the Munster Minor Football Championship on all 3 occasions. He played in goal for 2 of those wins in 2001 and 2002, captaining the 2002 team.

Under 21

He played with the Kerry Under 21 team in the 2003 Munster Under-21 Football Championshipfinal as a goalkeeper in a surprise loss to Waterford. He played from 2004 to 2006 but had little success.

Senior

He joined the Kerry senior team during the 2004 All-Ireland Senior Football Championship where he was part of the winning panel.

He made his debut during the 2005 National League.

In November 2017, Sheehan announced his retirement from inter-county football.
