= Austin Stacks GAA =

Gaelic sports club in Tralee, Ireland

Austin Stacks
- Aibhistín de Staic
- Founded: 1917
- County: Kerry
- Nickname: The Rock, Rockies, Rock Street, The Stacks
- Colours: Black & amber
- Grounds: Connolly Park, Rock Street, Tralee.
- Coordinates: 52°16′13.08″N 9°41′46.35″W

Playing kits
Standard colours

Senior Club Championships
	All Ireland	Munster champions	Kerry champions
Football:	1	2	13
Hurling:	-	-	4
Ladies' football:	–	–	4

Austin Stacks is a hurling and Gaelic football club based in Tralee in County Kerry, Ireland. Founded in 1917, the club has more All-Ireland Senior Football Championship medals and GAA All-Stars than any other Gaelic Athletic Association (GAA) club in Ireland.

== History ==
=== Origins ===
Founded in 1917, the club is named after Austin Stack, Irish revolutionary and captain of the All-Ireland winning Kerry Gaelic football team of 1904. They are the only club in Kerry to have won Senior County Championships in both hurling and football, including doubles in 1928 and 1931.

=== Gaelic football ===
The club won the 1976–77 All-Ireland Senior Club Football Championship.

Notable players with the club have included Joe Barrett, Mikey Sheehy, Ger Power, John O'Keeffe, Cork's Dinny Long, William Kirby, Kieran Donaghy (who won player of the year after leading Kerry to success in 2006) and Daniel Bohane most recent AI winners include Dylan Casey and Joe O'Connor. The club has more All-Ireland Senior Football Championship medals and GAA All-Stars than any other GAA club in Ireland.

The club's most recent Senior Co. Championship win was in 2021 when they defeated local rivals Kerins O'Rahillys on a score line of Austin Stacks 0-13 Kerins O'Rahilly's 0-10. They contested the 2025 Senior Co. Final but were defeated by Dingle. The club are current U21 Champions winning back to back titles in 2024 and 2025.

=== Hurling ===
Austin Stacks have won the Kerry Senior Hurling Championship 4 times. They won the Kerry Junior Hurling Championship in 2012, 2015 and 2016. They no longer play hurling in the club. They also won Minor County Championships in 1955, 1967 and 1986.

== All Ireland Senior medal winners ==
- Ger Power (8) 1975, 1978, 1979, 1980 (c), 1981, 1984, 1985, 1986
- Mikey Sheehy (8) 1975, 1978, 1979, 1980, 1981, 1984, 1985, 1986
- John O'Keeffe (7) 1969, 1970, 1975, 1978, 1979, 1980, 1981
- Joe Barrett (6) 1924, 1926, 1929, 1930, 1931, 1932
- Jackie Ryan (6) 1924, 1926, 1929, 1930, 1931, 1932
- Micko Doyle (5) 1929, 1930, 1931, 1932, 1937 (c)
- John Joe Purty Landers (5) 1929, 1930, 1931, 1932, 1937
- Tim Roundy Landers (5) 1931, 1932, 1937, 1939, 1941
- Ger O'Keeffe (4) 1975, 1979, 1980, 1981
- Kieran Donaghy (4) 2006, 2007, 2009, 2014
- Denis Rory O'Connell (3) 1924, 1926, 1929
- Jimmy Gawksie Gorman (3) 1939, 1940, 1941
- Jimmy Baily (3) 1924, 1926, 1929
- Daniel Bohan (3) 2006, 2007, 2009
- Ned Pedlar Sweeney (2) 1929, 1930
- Tommy Barrett (2) 1930, 1931
- Dan Ryan (2) 1930, 1931
- Martin Bracker O'Regan (2) 1931, 1932
- William Kirby (2) 1997, 2004
- Bill Landers (2) 1924, 1932
- Gerry Pluggy Moriarty (2) 1924, 1926
- Joe O'Connor (2) 2022, 2024
- Dylan Casey (2) 2022, 2025
- Tom O'Connor (1) 1929
- Michael Healy (1) 1932
- Jo Jo Barrett (1) 1962
- John L McElligott (1) 1979
- Pa Laide (1) 1997
- John Gal Slattery (1) 1926
- Shane O'Callaghan (1) 2014
- Fearghal MacNamara (1) 2014
- Greg Horan (1) 2022
- Jack O'Shea (1) 2022
- Armin Heinrich (1) 2025

== Roll of honour ==
Football

- All-Ireland Senior Club Football Championship (1): 1977
- Kerry Senior Football Championship (13): 1928, 1930, 1931, 1932, 1936, 1973, 1975, 1976, 1979, 1986, 1994, 2014, 2021
- Munster Club Champions (2): 1976, 2014
- Senior Club Football Championships (6): 1979, 2003, 2016, 2019, 2020, 2021
- Kerry Intermediate Football Championship (1): 2024
- Munster Intermediate Club Football Championship (1): 2024
- Kerry County Football League – Division 1 (11): 1973, 1974, 1975, 1978, 1979, 1980, 1982, 1990, 2011, 2014, 2019, 2025.
- Kerry County Football League – Division 2 (1): 2010, 2024.
- Kerry Under-21 Football Championship (1): 2002, 2024, 2025.
- Kerry Minor Football Championship (2): 1969, 1980
- Kerry Minor Football League – Division 1 (6): 1973, 1979, 1994, 2000, 2013, 2017
- Under-21 Club Football Championship (1): 2008

Hurling

- Kerry Senior Hurling Championships (3): 1928, 1929, 1931,
- Kerry County Hurling League – Division 3 (1): 2017
- Kerry Junior Hurling Championship (3): 2012, 2015, 2016
- Kerry Minor Hurling Championships (3): 1955, 1967, 1986

== County championship winning captains ==
Football

- 1928: Joe Barrett
- 1930: Joe Barrett
- 1931: Joe Barrett
- 1932: Joe Barrett
- 1936: Miko Doyle
- 1973: Billy Curtin
- 1975: Joe Joe Barrett
- 1976: John O'Keeffe
- 1979: Ger Power
- 1986: Mike Counihan
- 1994: Pat Slattery
- 2014: Barry Shanahan
- 2021: Dylan Casey

Hurling (Senior)

- 1928: Joe Barrett
- 1929: Dan Rayn
- 1931: Joe Barrett

Hurling (Junior)

- 2012: Andrew Morrissey
- 2015: Danny Maguire
- 2016: Andrew Foley

== Notable players ==
- Joe Barrett Six time All-Ireland Senior Football Championship winner. 1929 All-Ireland Senior Football Championship and 1932 All-Ireland Senior Football Championship winning captain. Winning captain of four County SFC and two SHC titles.
- Miko Doyle Five time All-Ireland Senior Football Championship winner. 1937 All-Ireland Senior Football Championship winning captain. Kerry Football Team of the Millennium member.
- Jackie Ryan Five time All-Ireland Senior Football Championship winner.
- John Joe Purty Landers Five time All-Ireland Senior Football Championship winner. All-Time All Star Award 1985
- Tim Roundy Landers Five time All-Ireland Senior Football Championship winner. All-Time All Star Award 1985. Kerry Football Team of the Millennium member.
- John O'Keeffe Seven time All-Ireland Senior Football Championship winner. Five time All-Star winner. Texaco Footballer of the Year 1975. 1977 All-Ireland Senior Club Football Championship winning captain. Kerry Football Team of the Millennium member.
- Ger Power Eight time All-Ireland Senior Football Championship winner. Six time All-Star winnier. 1980 All-Ireland Senior Football Championship winning captain. Kerry Football Team of the Millennium member.
- Mikey Sheehy Eight time All-Ireland Senior Football Championship winner. Seven time All-Star winnier. Texaco Footballer of the Year 1979. Kerry Football Team of the Millennium member.
- Kieran Donaghy Four time All-Ireland Senior Football Championship winner. Three time All-Star winnier. Texaco Footballer of the Year 2006, GAA/GPA Footballer of the Year 2006.
- Billy Sheehan, played for both Kerry and Laois senior football teams. He played with Laois inter-county team for a total of eleven years from 2004 to 2015. He was manager of the Laois county team from 2021 until 2023.
- Ger O'Keeffe Three All-Ireland Senior Football Championship winner.
- William Kirby Two time All-Ireland Senior Football Championship winner.
- Pa Laide 1997 All-Star winner.
- Dinny Long All-Ireland Senior Football Championship winner with Cork. Two time All-Star winner.
- Joe O'Connor, 2022 All-Ireland SFC-winning captain
- Dylan Casey, 2021 Kerry Senior County Championship winning captain. He made he senior county championship debut for Kerry in 2022.
- Liam Kearns Intercounty manager with Limerick, Laois, Tipperary and Offaly.
- Gary Scollard1976 All-Ireland Senior B Hurling Championship winner.
