= Spa GAA =

Gaelic football club in County Kerry, Ireland

- Spá CLG
- Founded: 1948
- County: Kerry
- Colours: Blue and Gold
- Grounds: Tullig, Killarney
- Coordinates: 52°04′14.04″N 9°28′00.58″W

Playing kits
Standard colours

Spa GAA is a Gaelic football club based in Tullig, Killarney in County Kerry, Ireland. Founded in 1948, the club gets its name from a spa well in the townland of Tullig close to Killarney. The club won the Munster Intermediate Club Football Championship in 2009.

== History ==
The club gets its name from the Spa Well, a source of water with reputed health giving properties, which is situated on the road side in the townland of Tullig, approximately three miles from Killarney town centre. The well was popular in the 18th and 19th centuries, when the people of Killarney often took the mineral-rich water as a cure for various ailments.

Spa GAA Club was founded in 1948, and has since grown to have over 500 members. The club's colours are blue and gold. The catchment area of the club is Killarney Parish. The club's facilities are located in Tullig, 1.5 km east of Park Road Roundabout, Killarney. Indoor facilities consist of a 600 sq.m. sports hall which is used for indoor football, hurling, basketball, athletics and volleyball. An adjoining building of 800 sq.m. has four dressing rooms, plus a gym, first aid room, kitchen, dance studio and meeting rooms.

Several players from Spa have worn county colours at senior level. Among them are Donie O'Sullivan, Michael Gleeson, Paudie O'Mahony, Pat Casey, Tim Regan, Michael McAuliffe, James Cahill, Niall O'Mahony and Michael O'Donoghue.

The club caters for boys and girls from u8 to u18 and the adult section has teams at Senior, Junior and U21.

The club won promotion to Division 1 of the Senior County League in November 2008, and are second only to Dr. Crokes in terms of O'Donoghue Cup wins. In 2009, Spa won their second County Intermediate championship and subsequently won the Munster Intermediate championship before losing the All-Ireland Intermediate Club Football Championship final to Cookstown following a "controversial" penalty. They were relegated back to the intermediate grade the following year. They followed that with county final losses at intermediate grade in 2012, 2014 and 2015 to Finuge GAA (replay), Ardfert GAA and St. Mary's respectively. After the three final losses, the club eventually won the 2020 Kerry Intermediate Football Championship to regain their senior status, beating Beaufort in the final 4-18 to 1-19. Following the promotion, Spa are one of only 8 senior football teams in Kerry.

== Achievements ==
- Kerry Intermediate Football Championship (3): 1974, 2009, 2020 (runners-Up 2012, 2014,2015)
- Munster Intermediate Club Football Championship (1): 2009
- All-Ireland Intermediate Club Football Championship (0): (Runner-Up 2010)
- East Kerry Senior Football Championship (10): 1966, 1969, 1971, 1972, 1974, 1975, 1977, 1985, 1987, 1989

== Notable players ==
- Michael Gleeson
- Mike O'Donoghue
- Paudie O'Mahony
- Donie O'Sullivan

Preceded by St. Michael's/Foilmore	Kerry Intermediate Football Championship; 2009	Succeeded by Gneeveguilla
Preceded by St. Michael's/Foilmore	Munster Intermediate Club Football Champions; 2009	Succeeded by Gneeveguilla
