= Kilcummin GAA =

Gaelic football club in County Kerry, Ireland

Kilcummin
- CLG Cill Cuimin
- Founded: 1910
- County: Kerry
- Colours: Red and Green
- Grounds: Kilcummin
- Coordinates: 52°05′58.11″N 9°28′28.10″W

Playing kits
Standard colours

Kilcummin is a Gaelic Athletic Association club from Kilcummin, near Killarney in County Kerry, Ireland. The club, which was founded in 1910, fields teams in Gaelic football only, with no hurling played. Together with 12 other football clubs, they form the East Kerry Division of Kerry GAA. The East Kerry board runs its own competitions for clubs within the division, including the East Kerry Senior Football Championship and the East Kerry Junior Football Championship.

== Honours ==
- Kerry Senior Football Championship (0): (runners-up 1903, 1913, 2002)
- Kerry Intermediate Football Championship (2): 1997, 2018
- Munster Intermediate Club Football Championship (1): 2018
- All-Ireland Intermediate Club Football Championship (1): 2019
- Kerry Junior Football Championship (2): 1973, 1991
- Kerry Minor Football Championship (1): 2010
- East Kerry Senior Football Championship (2): 1925, 1973
- East Kerry Junior Football Championship (6): 1977, 1983, 1989, 1992, 1993, 2018

== Notable players ==
- Brendan Kealy
- Seán Kelly
- Mike McCarthy
- Mark Moynihan
- Shane Murphy
- Dee O'Connor
