= Dara Moynihan =

Irish Gaelic footballer

Personal information
- Born: 1998 (age 27–28) Killarney, County Kerry, Ireland
- Occupation: Student
- Height: 6 ft 0 in (183 cm)

Sport
- Sport: Gaelic football
- Position: Right wing-forward
Clubs
- Years: Club
- Spa → East Kerry
Club titles
- Kerry titles: 2
College
- Years: College
- 2018-2023: MTU Kerry
College titles
- Sigerson titles: 0
Inter-county
- Years: County
- 2019-present: Kerry
Inter-county titles
- Munster titles: 4
- All-Irelands: 1
- NFL: 3
- All Stars: 0

Dara Moynihan (born 1998) is an Irish Gaelic footballer. At club level he plays with Spa, formerly with divisional side East Kerry and at inter-county level with the Kerry senior football team.

== Career ==
Moynihan first played Gaelic football to a high standard as a schoolboy at St Brendan's College in Killarney. He was part of the school team that won back-to-back Hogan Cup titles in 2016 and 2017, with Moynihan captaining the team for the latter victory. He later played with MTU Kerry in the Sigerson Cup.

By that stage, Moynihan had also progressed to adult level with the Spa club, winning a Kerry IFC title in 2020. He had previously lined out with divisional side East Kerry and won back-to-back Kerry SFC medals in 2019 and 2020.

Moynihan first appeared on the inter-county scene with Kerry as a member of the minor team that beat Galway in the 2014 All-Ireland minor final. A one-year association with the under-20 team yielded a Munster U20FC medal in 2018.

After his under-20 tenure came to an end, Moynihan was drafted onto the senior team in 2019. He won the first of four Munster SFC medals in five seasons that year. Moynihan was a substitute when Kerry were beaten by Dublin in the 2019 All-Ireland final replay. He won three consecutive National League medals from 2020 to 2022. Moynihan won an All-Ireland SFC medal as a member of the extended panel, after a defeat of Galway in the 2022 final.

== Honours ==
St Brendan's College

- Hogan Cup: 2016, 2017 (c)
- Corn Uí Mhuirí: 2016, 2017

Spa

- Kerry Intermediate Football Championship: 2020

East Kerry

- Kerry Senior Football Championship: 2019, 2020
- Kerry Under-21 Football Championship: 2018, 2019
- Kerry Minor Football Championship: 2016

Kerry

- All-Ireland Senior Football Championship: 2022
- Munster Senior Football Championship: 2019, 2021, 2022, 2023
- National Football League: 2020, 2021, 2022
- Munster Under-20 Football Championship: 2018
- All-Ireland Minor Football Championship: 2016
- Munster Minor Football Championship: 2016
