= Leonard Grey (Gaelic footballer) =

Irish Gaelic footballer

Sport
- Sport: Gaelic football
Club
- Years: Club
- St Patrick's
Inter-county
- Years: County
- Louth

Leonard Grey is an Irish Gaelic footballer who plays for St Patrick's and the Louth county team.

Grey played for Louth in the 2017 Leinster Minor Football Championship final. He also played against David Clifford in the 2017 All-Ireland Minor Football Championship quarter-final. Grey played in the 2023 Leinster Senior Football Championship final when Mickey Harte managed. It was his first senior provincial decider. He then played for Louth in the 2024 Leinster Senior Football Championship final when Ger Brennan managed.

Grey was named as a substitute for the 2026 All-Ireland Senior Football Championship semi-final match against Mayo.
