= 2022 Kerry Senior Football Championship =

Gaelic football tournament season

2022 Kerry SFC
Tournament details
- County: Kerry
- Year: 2022
- Trophy: Bishop Moynihan Cup
- Sponsor: Garvey's Supervalu
- Teams: 16
- Defending champions: Austin Stacks

Winners
- Champions: East Kerry
- Manager: Jerry O’Sullivan
- Captain: Paul Murphy

Runners-up
- Runners-up: Mid Kerry
- Manager: Peter O’Sullivan
- Captain: Mike Breen

Other
- Top Scorer: Sean O’Shea
- Website: Kerry GAA

The 2022 Kerry Senior Football Championship was the 121st edition of Kerry GAA's premier Gaelic football tournament for senior teams in County Kerry, Ireland. The tournament consists of 16 teams (8 club teams and 8 divisional teams), with the winners representing Kerry in the Munster Senior Club Football Championship if they are a club team. If the winners are a divisional team the winners of the Kerry Club Football Championship represent the county.

== Format structure change ==
Eight club teams and eight divisional teams (16 in total) will take part in the 2022 S.F.C.

The 16 teams are divided into four mini-leagues of four teams. Each team plays three matches and the top two teams will progress to the quarterfinals

Kenmare District did not field a team for this S.F.C.

Relegation (See below): The club team to be relegated from the Senior County Championship will be the same team to be relegated from the Senior Club Championship (The 8 senior clubs play off against each other in two pools in the Club Championship. The two teams that finished bottom of the Group Pools enter a Relegation Final. This loser will be relegated to the I.F.C. for 2023. Should a club reach the final of the County championship they will be exempt from the Relegation process in the Club championship).

The winner of the 2022 I.F.C. will be promoted to the 2023 Senior County and Club Championships.

== Team changes ==
The following teams have changed division since the 2021 championship season.

=== To Championship ===
Promoted from the Kerry Intermediate Football Championship

- Na Gaeil

=== From Championship ===
Relegated to the Kerry Intermediate Football Championship

- Legion

== Participating teams ==
The teams taking part in the 2022 Kerry Senior Football Championship are:

=== 2022 Teams ===
Team	Location	Club/Divisional	Club's Divisional Side	Championship Titles	Last Championship Title
Austin Stacks	Tralee	Club	St Brendan’s	13	2021
Dingle	Dingle	Club	West Kerry	6	1948
Dr Crokes	Killarney	Club	East Kerry	13	2018
East Kerry	East Kerry	Division	N/A	9	2020
Feale Rangers	North Kerry	Division	N/A	3	2007
Kenmare Shamrocks	Kenmare	Club	Kenmare District	0	-
Kerins O'Rahillys	Tralee	Club	St Brendan's	6	2002
Mid Kerry	Mid Kerry	Division	N/A	4	2008
Na Gaeil	Tralee	Club	St Brendan's	0	-
Shannon Rangers	North Kerry	Division	N/A	5	1977
South Kerry	South Kerry	Division	N/A	10	2015
Spa	Killarney	Club	East Kerry	0	-
St Brendan's	Tralee	Division	N/A	0	-
St Kieran's	Castleisland	Division	N/A	1	1988
Templenoe	Templenoe	Club	Kenmare District	0	-
West Kerry	West Kerry	Division	N/A	3	1990

== Results ==
=== Round 1 ===
All 16 teams enter the competition in Round 1 with four groups of four teams playing each other once. The top two teams in each group proceed to the Quarter-Finals while the bottom two teams are eliminated.

=== Group 1 ===
Team	Pld	W	D	L	PF	PA	PD	Pts
Dr Crokes	3	2	1	0	62	46	+16	5
Kenmare Shamrocks	3	2	1	0	51	44	+7	5
Shannon Rangers	3	1	0	2	50	59	-9	2
St Kieran's	3	0	0	3	45	59	-14	0

Round 1

11 September 2022 Round 1	Dr Crokes	2-14 (20) – (14) 0-14	St Kieran's	Milltown/Castlemaine
14:30 GMT (UTC+0)
	Gls: C McMahon 1-2, T Brosnan 0-4 (0-2fs), K O’Leary 1-0, M Potts 0-2, F Fitzgerald, B Looney, M O’Shea, D Shaw, T Doyle, M Fitzgerald 0-1 each.	Report	Gls: P Walsh 0-8 (0-3fs), E Horan 0-2 (fs), P O’Connor, S Og O Ciardubhain (’45), B Leonard, J Walsh 0-1 each	Referee: Seamus Mulvihill

11 September 2022 Round 1	Shannon Rangers	0-17 (17) – (14) 1-10	Kenmare Shamrocks	Fitzgerald Stadium
14:00 GMT (UTC+0)
	Gls: S O’Shea 0-6 (all frees), S O’Brien 0-5, D Hallissey 0-2, S O’Sullivan, J McCarthy, K O’Sullivan, J Lehane 0-1 each.	Report	Gls: C Langan 1-4 (0-3f, 1-0 pen), A Doherty 0-5 (0-3F), M Foley 0-1.	Referee: Brian Fleming

Round 2

18 September 2022 Round 2	Dr Crokes	2-19 (25) – (15) 1-12	Shannon Rangers
14:30 GMT (UTC+0)				Venue: Dr Crokes
	Pts: T Brosnan (1-8, 5f, 1’45), C McMahon (1-3), T Doyle (0-2), J Payne, F Fitzgerald, E Looney, B Looney, M O’Shea and K O’Leary (0-1each)	Report	Pts: J Kennelly (0-6, 3fs, 1m), a Doherty (1-0), J Foley, M Heaphy, C Langan (f), R Stack, D Keane and P Blake (0-1 each)	Referee: John Michael Fitzgerald

18 September 2022 Round 2	St Kieran's	1-11 (14) – (17) 1-14	Kenmare Shamrocks	Cordal GAA
14:30 GMT (UTC+0)
	Pts: P Walsh 1-4 (2fs, 1m), P O’Connor 0-2, E Horan and J Walsh 0-2 (both frees), D O’Shea 0-1	Report	Pts: S O’Shea 0-10 (8fs), D Hallissey 1-0, S O’Sullivan, K O’Sullivan, D McCarthy, J Lehane 0-1 each	Referee: Sean Joy

Round 3

24 September 2022 Round 3	Kenmare Shamrocks	0-17 (17) – (17) 1-14	Dr Crokes
14:30 GMT (UTC+0)				Venue: Kenmare Shamrocks
	Gls: S O’Shea (0-10, 4f, 2m), G Wharton, K O’Sullivan and S O’Brien (0-2 each) and D O’Shea (0-1)	Report	Gls: T Brosnan (0-6, 2f), C McMahon (1-1), D Casey and M Potts (0-2 each), D Shaw, B Looney and T Doyle (0-1 each)	Referee: Brendan Brosnan

25 September 2022 Round 3	Shannon Rangers	4-10 (22) – (17) 1-14	St Kieran's	Ballylongford
14:30 GMT (UTC+0)
	Gls: C Langan 1-4 (1-0 pen, 2f), D Foley 1-2, Danny Stack 1-2 (1f), P O’Connell 1-1, S McDonnell 0-1	Report	Gls: J Walsh 0-6 (5f), C McElligott 1-1, M Keane 0-2, J Bell 0-2 (1 ‘45’), B Rahilly 0-1, D Roche 0-1, J Walsh 0-1	Referee: John Purcell

=== Group 2 ===
Team	Pld	W	D	L	PF	PA	PD	Pts
East Kerry	3	3	0	0	59	37	+22	6
Dingle	3	3	0	0	60	38	+22	4
Spa	3	1	0	2	43	52	-9	2
Kerins O'Rahilly's	3	0	0	3	40	75	-35	0

Round 1

11 September 2022 Round 1	Spa	1-06 (9) – (22) 4-10	Dingle	Laune Rangers GAA
14:30 GMT (UTC+0)
	Gls: D Spillane (1-0 mark), E Cronin (2fs and M Foley (1fs) (0-2 each), S Cronin and G Vaughan (0-1 each)	Report	Gls: P Geaney (1-2, 2fs), M Geaney (1-1, 1-0 pen), D Geaney (0-4), B O ’Connor (1-1), N Geaney (1-0), T O’Sullivan (0-2 frees)	Referee: Daniel Clifford

10 September 2022 Round 1	East Kerry	2-20 (26) – (14) 1-11	Kerins O'Rahilly's	Austin Stack Park
19:30 GMT (UTC+0)
	Gls: R Murphy (1-5), J O’Donoghue (1-4, 2 frees), P Clifford (0-4), S Ryan (0-3, two marks), C O’Donghue, C Gammell, P Darcy, R O’Grady (0-1 each).		Gls: C Hayes (1-3), B J Keane (0-4, 2 frees), D Moran (0-2), G O’Brien, G Savage (free) (0-1 each).	Referee: Brendan Griffin

Round 2

17 September 2022 Round 2	East Kerry	0-14 (14) – (9) 0-09	Spa	Fitzgerald Stadium
17:30 GMT (UTC+0)
	Pts: D Clifford and J O’Donoghue (1f) (0-3 each), S Ryan (1f) and R Buckley (0-2 each), R Murphy, B O’Keeffe (m), P Warren and N Donohue (0-1 each)	Report	Pts: E Cronin (0- 4 frees), M Foley (1f), D Spillane, Eoghan Cronin, M O’Donoghue and C Tobin (0-1 each)	Referee: Peter Curtin

18 September 2022 Round 2	Kerins O'Rahilly's	0-10 (10) – (24) 3-15	Dingle	Kerins O'Rahilly's
15:30 GMT (UTC+0)
	Pts: J Savage (0-6, 5fs), C Hayes (0-2), B J Keane and G Savage (0-1 each	Report	Pts: P Geaney (2-5, 1f), B O’Sullivan ( 1-4, 4 frees), G H Curran( f), T O’Sullivan, M Geaney, D Geaney, M Flaherty, D O’Sullivan and T de Brún (0-1 each)	Referee: Billy O Shea

Round 3

25 September 2022 Round 3	Dingle	1-11 (14) – (19) 2-13	East Kerry	Dingle
14:30 GMT (UTC+0)
	Gls: B O'Sullivan (0-5, 2f), P Geaney (1-0), D Geaney (0-3), M Flaherty, T O'Sullivan (0-1)	Report	Gls: D Clifford (1-4, 1f), R Murphy (1-0), P Clifford (0-3), C O’Donoghue (0-2), D Roche (0-2), P Murphy (0-1), D O’Sullivan (0-1)	Referee: Jonathan Griffin

24 September 2022 Round 3	Spa	4-13 (25) – (16) 0-16	Kerins O'Rahilly's	Spa
17:30 GMT (UTC+0)
	Gls: E Cronin 1-2 (0-1f), C Spillane (1-1), L Kearney (1-0), L Spillane (0-3), M O’Donoghue (1-0), D Spillane (0-2), Cian Tobin (0-2), G Vaughan (0-1), T Cronin (0-1),	Report	Gls: D O’Connor 0-3 (1f), B John Keane 0-3 (2f, 1m), T Hoare 0-3 (2f), C Sayers (0-2), B Hanifan (0-2), S Walsh (0-1), D O’Sullivan (0-1f), C Hayes (0-1)	Referee: Donal Casey

=== Group 3 ===
Team	Pld	W	D	L	PF	PA	PD	Pts
Mid Kerry	3	3	0	0	55	39	+16	6
Austin Stacks	3	2	0	0	43	40	+3	4
Na Gaeil	3	1	0	2	54	52	+2	2
West Kerry	3	0	0	3	42	63	-19	0

Round 1

9 September 2022 Round 1	Austin Stacks	0-14 (14) – (11) 1-08	Na Gaeil	Austin Stack Park
20:00 GMT (UTC+0)
	Gls: D Mannix (0-4, 1f), S O’Callaghan (0-3), M O’Donnell and C Horan (0-2 each), P O’Sullivan’s, B O’Sullivan’s and S Quilter (0-1 each)	Report	Gls: D O’Connor (0-6 frees), J Sheehan, (1-0(, J Barry (1f) and D Bourke (0-1 each)	Referee: Jonathan Griffin

10 September 2022 Round 1	Mid Kerry	1-14 (17) – (13) 1-10	West Kerry	Austin Stack Park
17:30 GMT (UTC+0)
	Gls: E O’Connor 0-6 (0-4fs), K Dennehy 1-1, J O’Connor 0-3, L Carey, D Houlihan, C Teahan, K Evans 0-1 each.	Report	Gls: C O’Grady 1-1, D O Se 0-3 (0-2fs), K Falvey 0-2, J Hickson, C O Muircheartaigh, R O Se, T Moriarty 0-1 each.	Referee: Edmund Walsh

Round 2

17 September 2022 Round 2	Austin Stacks	2-13 (19) – (11) 1-08	West Kerry	Austin Stacks
18:00 GMT (UTC+0)
	Pts: C Horan (1-2); M O’Gara (1-0); S O’Callaghan (0-3); C Purcell (0-2); G Horan, C Jordan, W Guthrie, S Quilter, D Casey, D Mannix (free) (0-1 each)	Report	Pts: E Ó Conchúir (0-3 frees); K Falvey (1-0); C O’Grady and T O’Donnell (0-2 each), C O Beaglaoich (0-1)	Referee: Tom Corbett

18 September 2022 Round 2	Na Gaeil	0-16 (16) – (20) 0-20	Mid Kerry	Na Gaeil
13:30 GMT (UTC+0)
	Pts: Diarmuid O’Connor 0-5 (0-4fs), D Burns 0-3 (0-2 ‘45s, 0-1f), J O’Connor, D Reen 0-2 each, D Goggin, A Barry, J Sheehan, J Barry (f) 0-1 each	Report	Pts: E O’Connor 0-8 (0-1 ’45, 0-4fs), L Carey 0-4, K Dennehy, J O’Connor 0-2 each, F Clfford (f), D Houlihan, K Evans (mk), C Kennedy 0-1 each	Referee: Eamonn Moran

Round 3

24 September 2022 Round 3	West Kerry	3-09 (17) – (27) 4-15	Na Gaeil
18:00 GMT (UTC+0)				Venue: Gallarus
	Gls: T O’Donnell (2-0), M Ó Mainnín (1-1), É Ó Conchúir (0-3, 2f), R Ó Sé (0-2), C Ó Beaglaoich (0-2), J Hickson (0-1f),	Report	Gls: D O’Connor (0-8, 6f), J Sheehan (2-2), D Reen (1-1), D Burns 0-1 (1 ‘45’), A Barry (0-1), D Goggin (1-0), T Ó hAiniféin (0-1), C Devine (0-1)	Referee: Denis Kennelly

25 September 2022 Round 3	Mid Kerry	1-15 (18) – (10) 1-7	Austin Stacks	Beaufort
14:30 GMT (UTC+0)
	Gls: F Clifford (1-1), L Carey (0-4), E O’Connor (0-3, 2fs), J O’Connor and J Brosnan (0-2 each), K Evans, D Houlihan and C Kennedy (0-1each)	Report	Gls: M O’Donnell (1-0), C Horan and D Mannix (0-2 each), S Quilter (1f), S O’Callaghan and C Jordan (0-1 each)	Referee: Brendan Griffin

=== Group 4 ===
Team	Pld	W	D	L	PF	PA	PD	Pts
Feale Rangers	3	3	0	0	51	36	+15	6
Templenoe	3	1	1	1	40	46	-6	3
South Kerry	3	0	2	1	43	39	-6	2
St Brendan's	3	0	1	2	44	47	-3	1

Round 1

11 September 2022 Round 1	South Kerry	0-14 (14) – (14) 1-11	Templenoe	Fitzgerald Stadium
15:45 GMT (UTC+0)
	Gls: D O’Donoghue 0-5, D O’Sullivan 0-2 (0-1f, 1 45’) D Daly 0-2 (0-1f), G O’Sullivan 0-2, M O’Sullivan, J Daly and A Cournane 0-1 each	Report	Gls: K Spillane 0-5 (0-3f’s), A Crowley 1-1 (0-1f), T Morley 0-2, C Crowley, P Casey and S O’Sullivan 0-1	Referee: Brendan Brosnan

11 September 2022 Round 1	St Brendan's	0-13 (13) – (15) 0-15	Feale Rangers	Castleisland Desmonds GAA
15:45 GMT (UTC+0)
	Gls: R Monahan (0-4, 1f), R Monahan and D O’Callaghan (2fs) 0-2 each, J Mortimer, N O’Driscoll, J Duggan (1f), L O’Donnell and E McElligott (0-1 each)	Report	Gls: M Stack (0-11, 3fs, 2ms), D Keane (0-3, 1f), C Trant (0-1)	Referee: Donal Casey

Round 2

17 September 2022 Round 2	St Brendan's Board	1-12 (15) – (16) 3-07	Templenoe	Ardfert
18:00 GMT (UTC+0)
	Pts: R Monahan 0-4, J Lenihan 1-0, D Griffin 0-3 (0-1f), A O’Donoghue 0-2, I Parker (f), N O’Driscoll, D O’Callaghan (f) 0-1 each	Report	Pts: S O’Sullivan 2-2 (0-2fs), P Clifford 1-0, K Spillane, A Crowley 0-2 (fs) each, D Cahalane 0-1	Referee: Paul Hayes

17 September 2022 Round 2	Feale Rangers	2-13 (19) – (13) 0-13	South Kerry	Listowel Emmets GAA
15:30 GMT (UTC+0)
	Pts: M Stack (0-7, 5f, 1m), D Keane (1-3, 1f), C O’Keeffe (1-0), N Collins, B Mahony and S Keane (0-1 each)	Report	Pts: D O’Sullivan (0-6, 4f, 1 ‘45), D Daly (0-4, 3f, 1m), G O’Sullivan, C O’Shea and D O’Donoghue (0-1 each)	Referee: Padraig O Sullivan

Round 3

25 September 2022 Round 3	Templenoe	0-10 (10) – (17) 1-14	Feale Rangers	Templenoe
14:30 GMT (UTC+0)
	Gls: K Spillane (0-4, 1f), A Crowley (0-3, 1f, 1’45’), G Crowley (0-2) and A Spillane (0-1)	Report	Gls: B O’Mahony (1-2), M Stack (0-5, 2f, 1m), E Browne, C O’Keeffe, B Sweeney, C Trant, S Stack, D Keane (f) and S Keane (0-1 each)	Referee: Billy O Shea

24 September 2022 Round 3	South Kerry	0-16 (16) – (16) 0-16	St Brendan's Board	Caherciveen
15:30 GMT (UTC+0)
	Gls: D Daly (0-8, 6 f’s, 1 mark), D O’Sullivan (0-4, 3f’s), A Cournane (0-2), D O’Donoghue and J Daly (0-1 each)	Report	Gls: N O’Driscoll (2f’s) and A O’Donoghue (2f’s) 0-4 each, M Kelliher (0-3, 2f’s), J Lenihan (0-2), D O’Sullivan, F O’Brien and E McCarthy (0-1 each)	Referee: Daniel Clifford

=== Quarter-finals ===
8 October 2022; 17:30; Quarter-Final	Feale Rangers	1-12 - 0-12 AET	Austin Stacks	Austin Stack Park; Referee: Brendan Brosnan
8 October 2022; 17:30; Quarter-Final	M Stack (0-5, 2fs), D Lynch (1-1), B Mahony (0-3,1f), R Mahony (0-2), S Stack (0-1)	Report	M O’Donnell (1f) and S Quilter (1f) (0-3) each, S O’Callaghan (0-2), W Guthrie (1f), G Horan, C Horan and G Fitzgerald (0-1 each)	Austin Stack Park; Referee: Brendan Brosnan

8 October 2022; 19:30; Quarter-Final	Dr Crokes	0-11 - 1-18	Dingle	Austin Stack Park; Referee: Brendan Griffin
8 October 2022; 19:30; Quarter-Final	T Brosnan (0-5, 4f), D Shaw (0-2), M Potts, M O’Shea, T Doyle, M Fitzgerald (0-1 each)	Report	P Geaney (0-5), T. O’Sullivan (0-5), D Geaney (1-2, 1m), B O’Sullivan (0-2), C Flannery (0-2), M Flaherty, M O’Connor (0-1).	Austin Stack Park; Referee: Brendan Griffin

9 October 2022; 13:00; Quarter-Final	Mid Kerry	0-13 - 0-11	Templenoe	Fitzgerald Stadium; Referee: Padraig O Sullivan
9 October 2022; 13:00; Quarter-Final	F Clifford (0-1), E O’Connor (0-2 frees, 0-1 ‘45), D Houlihan (0-3 each); K Evans, K Dennehy, L Carey, J O’Connor (0-1 each)	Report	K Spillane (0-2 frees), S O’Sullivan (0-1 free), T Morley (0-2 each); B Crowley, P Clifford, A Spillane, A Crowley (0-1 free), C Crowley (0-1 each)	Fitzgerald Stadium; Referee: Padraig O Sullivan

9 October 2022; 2:45; Quarter-Final	East Kerry	0-13 - 1-07	Kenmare Shamrocks	Fitzgerald Stadium; Referee: Billy O Shea
9 October 2022; 2:45; Quarter-Final	D Clifford (0-7, 3f, 1m); D Roche (0-4, 2f); R Buckley, P Clifford (0-1 each)	Report	S O’Shea (0-5, 3f, 1 ‘45); P O’Connor (1-0, 1-0p); D Hallissey, S O’Brien (0-1 each)	Fitzgerald Stadium; Referee: Billy O Shea

=== Semi-finals ===
15 October 2022; 7:15pm Semi-Final	Feale Rangers	0-09 - 0-15	Mid Kerry	Austin Stack Park; Referee: Donal Casey
15 October 2022; 7:15pm Semi-Final	B Mahony and M Stack (2fs) (0-3 each), E O’Flaherty (0-2).	Report	E O’Connor (0-5, 2fs), L Carey (0-3), J O’Connor (0-3, 2fs), M Breen, D Houlihan, F Clifford, and K Evans (0-1 each)	Austin Stack Park; Referee: Donal Casey

16 October 2022; 2:30pm Semi-Final	Dingle	1-08 - 1-09	East Kerry	Austin Stack Park; Referee: Paul Hayes
16 October 2022; 2:30pm Semi-Final	P Geaney (0-4, one mark), D Geaney (1-1), T. O’Sullivan (0-2), B O’Sullivan (0-1)	Report	P Clifford (1-2), P. Murphy (0-2), D Clifford (free), R Buckley, R Murphy, C Gammell, P. O’Shea (0-1 each)	Austin Stack Park; Referee: Paul Hayes

== Final ==
30 October 2022; 2:15pm Final	East Kerry	1-16 - 0-10	Mid Kerry	Austin Stack Park; Referee: Brendan Griffin
30 October 2022; 2:15pm Final	D Clifford (1-9, 2 frees, 1mark), D Roche (0-3, 1f), P Clifford (0-2), D Lyne and R Murphy (0-1each)	Report	E O’Connor ( 0-3, 2fs), K Dennehy ( 1m) and F Clifford ( 2fs) 0-2 each, P Kilkenny, K Evans and G O’Grady ( 0-1 each)	Austin Stack Park; Referee: Brendan Griffin

== Relegation play-off ==
The club team to be relegated from the Senior County Championship will be the same team to be relegated from the Senior Club Championship. The 8 senior clubs are placed into two groups containing four teams during the Club Championship. The teams to finish bottom of both groups will face off in the Relegation Final, with the loser being relegated to the I.F.C. for 2023. Should a club reach the final of the County championship they will be exempt from the Relegation process in the Club championship.

23 October 2022
1:15pm
Relegation play-off

Kenmare Shamrocks	3-11 - 1-15	Austin Stacks
S O’Shea (0-8, 3f, 2’45), S O’Brien (1-1), J McCarthy and D Hallissey (1-0 each), S O’Sullivan and P O’Connor (0-1 each).	Report	M O’Donnell (1-2, 1f), S Quilter (0-4f), D Mannix (0-4,1f), S O’Callaghan (0-3), J O’Shea and A Heinrich (0-1 each)

Fitzgerald Stadium
Referee: Pádraig O’Sullivan

== Championship statistics ==
=== Top scorers ===
Overall

Rank	Player	Club	Tally	Total	Matches	Average
1	Seán O'Shea	Kenmare Shamrocks	0-39	39	5	7.80
2	Martin Stack	Feale Rangers	0-31	31	5	6.20
3	David Clifford	East Kerry	2-24	30	5	6.00
4	Paul Geaney	Dingle	4-16	28	5	5.60
5	Éanna O'Connor	Mid Kerry	0-27	27	5	5.40
6	Tony Brosnan	Dr. Crokes	1-23	26	4	6.50
7	Donnacha O'Connor	Na Gaeil	0-19	19	3	6.33
8	Cian McMahon	Dr. Crokes	3-06	15	4	3.75
8	Cillian Langan	Shannon Rangers	2-09	15	3	5.00
8	Paul Walsh	St. Kieran's	1-12	15	2	7.50
8	Paudie Clifford	East Kerry	1-12	15	5	3.00
8	Barry Dan O'Sullivan	Dingle	1-12	15	5	3.00

In a single game

Rank	Player	Club	Tally	Total	Opposition
1	David Clifford	East Kerry	1-09	12	Mid Kerry
2	Paul Geaney	Dingle	2-05	11	Kerins O'Rahilly's
2	Tony Brosnan	Dr. Crokes	1-08	11	Shannon Rangers
2	Martin Stack	Feale Rangers	0-11	11	St. Brendan's
5	Seán O'Shea	Kenmare Shamrocks	0-10	10	St. Kieran's
5	Seán O'Shea	Kenmare Shamrocks	0-10	10	Dr. Crokes
7	Jack Sheehan	Na Gaeil	2-02	8	West Kerry
7	Stephen O'Sullivan	Templenoe	2-02	8	St. Brendan's
7	Ruairí Murphy	East Kerry	1-05	8	Kerins O'Rahilly's
7	Paul Walsh	St. Kieran's	0-08	8	Dr. Crokes
7	Éanna O'Connor	Mid Kerry	0-08	8	Na Gaeil
7	Donnacha O'Connor	Na Gaeil	0-08	8	West Kerry
7	Daniel Daly	South Kerry	0-08	8	St. Brendan's
7	Seán O'Shea	Kenmare Shamrocks	0-08	8	Austin Stacks

=== Miscellaneous ===
- Na Gaeil make their first appearance at senior level.
- Dingle get their first win over Dr. Croke's in the SFC.
- Austin Stacks are relegated for the first time in their history.
- Austin Stacks become the first club to relegated to the Intermediate championship after winning the senior title in the previous season.
