= 2017 Hogan Cup =

- Dates: 18 March – 1 April 2017
- Teams: 4
- Sponsor: Masita
- Champions: St Brendan's College (4th title); Dara Moynihan (captain); Garry McGrath (manager)
- Runners-up: St Peter's College; Conor Firman (captain); Brian Malone (manager); Chris Murphy (manager)

Tournament statistics
- Matches played: 3
- Goals scored: 8 (2.67 per match)
- Points scored: 71 (23.67 per match)
- Top scorer(s): David Shaw (2-06)

The 2017 Hogan Cup was the 64th staging of the Hogan Cup since its establishment by the Gaelic Athletic Association in 1946. The competition ran from 18 March to 1 April 2017.

St Brendan's College were the defending champions.

The final was played on 1 April 2017 at Croke Park in Dublin, between St Brendan's College and St Peter's College, in what was their first ever meeting in the final. St Brendan's College won the match by 0–18 to 0–10 to claim their fourth Hogan Cup title overall and a second title in succession.

David Shaw was the top scorer with 2-06.

== Qualification ==
Province	Champions
Connacht	St Colman's College
Leinster	St Peter's College
Munster	St Brendan's College
Ulster	St Mary's Grammar School

== Results ==
=== Semi-finals ===
18 March 2017 Semi-final	St Brendan's College	3-13 - 1-11	St Colman's College	Cusack Park
	D Shaw (2-2), M O’Shea (1-1), D O’Sullivan (0-3, 1f), N Donohoe and D Moynihan (0-2 each), C Flynn, C Gammell and B Courtney (‘45’) (0-1 each)	Report	E Ronane (0-4, 1f), C Diskin (1-0), J Ronayne (0-3), J Jennings, B Quinn, C Goulding and S McGreal (0-1 each)	Referee: J Hickey (Carlow)

22 March 2017 Semi-final	St Peter's College	2-10 - 2-09	St Mary's Grammar School	Páirc Grattan
	Q Saunders (1-1), R O’Connor (1-1); C Devereux (0-3, 1f), D Furlong (0-1), D Lyne (0-1), B Deeney (0-1), B Moore (0-1), B O’Connor (0-1),	[https://www.danskebankulsterschoolsgaa.com/st-marys-come-just-short-hogan-semi/ Report[	K Small (1-3, 0-2f), C Murphy (1-1); T McAteer (0-2), L Quinn (0-2); K McCann (0-1).	Referee: J Hickey (Carlow)

=== Final ===
1 April 2017 Final	St Brendan's College	0-18 - 0-10	St Peter's College	Croke Park
	B Courtney 0-4 ( 3f, 1 '45'), D O'Sullivan, D Shaw 0-4 each, D Moynihan 0-2, J Griffin, M O'Shea, C Flynn, M Devlin 0-1 each.	Report	B O'Connor 0-5 (1f), C Devereux 0-4 (3fs), R O'Connor 0-1.	Referee: S Hurson (Tyrone)

== Statistics ==
=== Top scorers ===
Rank	Player	Club	Tally	Total	Matches	Average
1	David Shaw	St Brendan's College	2-06	12	2	6.00
2	Donnchadh O'Sullivan	St Brendan's College	0-07	7	2	3.50
2	Cathal Devereux	St Peter's College	0-07	7	2	3.50
4	Kevin Small	St Mary's GS	1-03	6	1	6.00
4	Barry O'Connor	St Brendan's College	0-06	6	2	3.00
