= David Clifford =

Kerry and Fossa Gaelic footballer (born 1999)

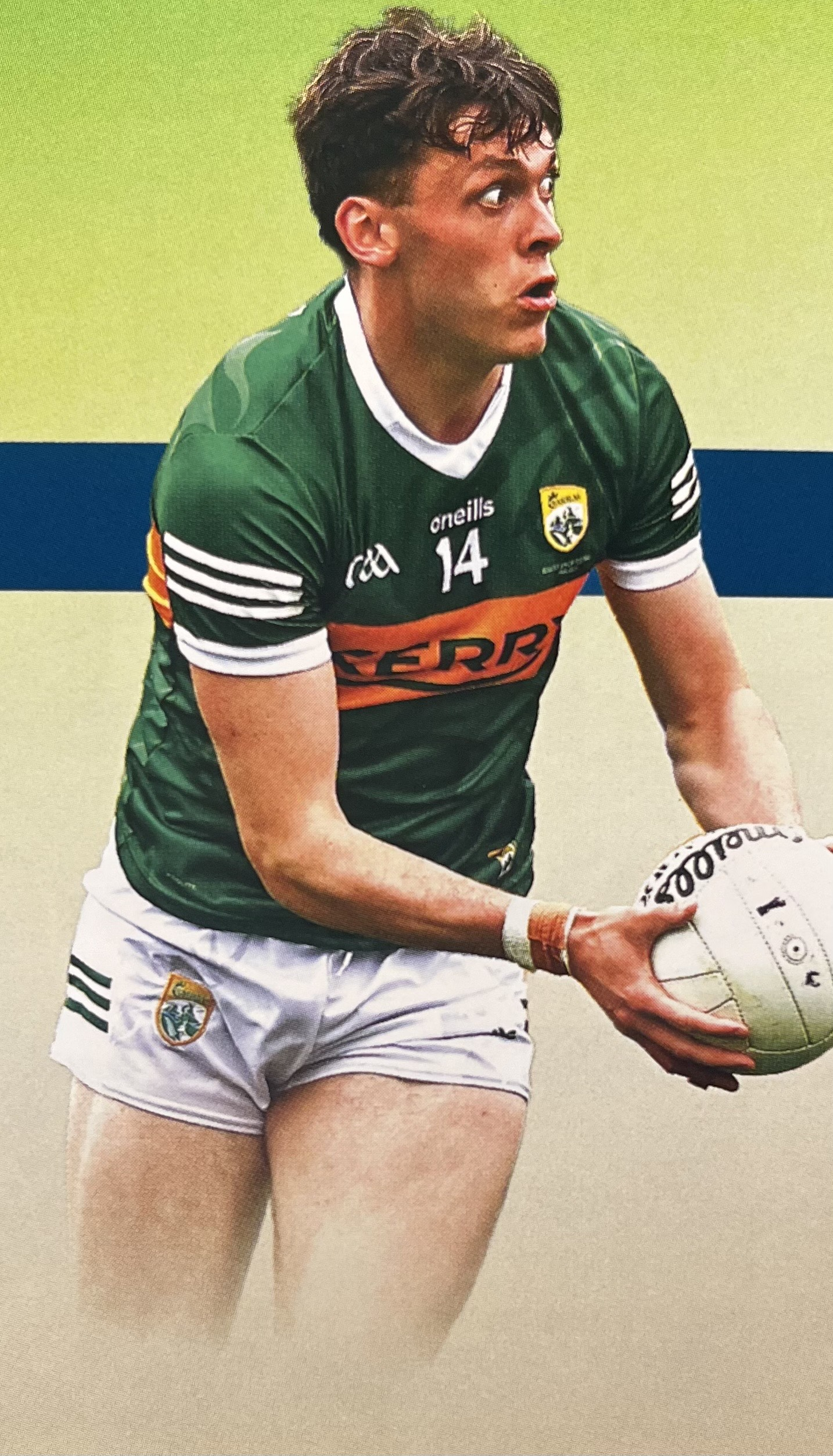
- David Clifford in action for Kerry in 2023

Personal information
- Native name: Daithí Ó Clúmháin (Irish)
- Born: 22 January 1999 (age 27) Tralee, County Kerry, Ireland
- Occupation: Secondary School Teacher
- Height: 6 ft 3 in (191 cm)

Sport
- Sport: Gaelic football
- Position: Corner forward
Clubs*
Years	Club	Apps (scores)
2017 – Present 2018 – 2026	Fossa; East Kerry (Divisional)	48 (26–314); 34 (21-136)
Club titles
- Kerry titles: 4 (Senior); 1 (Intermediate); 1 (Junior Premier)
- Munster titles: 1 (Junior)
- All-Ireland Titles: 1 (Junior)
College(s)
- Years: College
- 2017 – 2021 2021 – 2022: IT Tralee; University of Limerick
Inter-county**
Years	County	Apps (scores)
2018 – Present	Kerry	53 (29–272)
Inter-county titles
- Munster titles: 8
- All-Irelands: 2
- NFL: 4
- All Stars: 7
- * club appearances and scores correct as of 21 November 2026. **Inter County team apps and scores correct as of 26 July 2026.

David Clifford (Irish: Daithí Ó Clúmháin) (born 22 January 1999) is a Gaelic footballer who plays corner-forward or full-forward for the Kerry county team and at club level for Fossa and divisional side East Kerry. He is a two-time Senior Football All-Ireland winner, a seven-time GAA/GPA All-Star and has won the GAA/GPA Footballer of the Year a record three times. He is the second highest scorer in the history of the All-Ireland Senior Football Championship. He is widely regarded as the greatest player of his generation and as one of the best of all time.

In a decorated underage career he won two All-Ireland Minor Championships and 2 Munster Minor Football Championships with Kerry; and the Hogan Cup with his school, St. Brendan's College, Killarney.

At club level with Fossa he has won the Kerry Intermediate Football Championship, Kerry Premier Junior Football Championship, Munster Junior Club Football Championship and an All-Ireland Junior Club Football Championship. With Divisional side East Kerry he has won 4 Kerry Senior Football Championship.

== Kerry ==
=== 2018 ===
==== National Football League ====
Clifford made his senior debut on January 28 against Donegal in Round 1 of the NFL. Starting left corner forward, he scored 0–01 before being replaced by Jack Savage. He scored 0-21 across 5 starts and 1 substitute appearance, as Kerry finished fifth in Division 1.

==== Munster Championship ====
Clifford won his first Munster Senior Football Championship title later that summer after over coming Clare (0–02) and then Cork (0–02) in the final.

==== All-Ireland Championship ====
Kerry failed to progress from their Super 8's group stage. Clifford scoring 1–05 against Galway, 1–03 against Monaghan and 2–06 against Kildare.

==== Awards ====
He ended the year with an All Star and as GAA/GPA Young Footballer of the Year.

=== 2019 ===
==== Munster Championship ====
In 2019, Clifford again won the Munster Senior Football Championship with Kerry, scoring 0–03 in the semi-final versus Clare and scoring 0–04 in the final versus Cork.

==== All-Ireland Championship ====
In the Super 8 group stage, Clifford scored 0–07 against Mayo, 0–03 against Donegal and was rested against Meath. He scored 0–05 in the semi-final against Tyrone.

Kerry went on to reach the All-Ireland senior final versus Dublin. It was Clifford's first appearance in the senior final, having played in two minor finals. He scored 0–02 in the drawn match and 0–05 in the replay, as Dublin ran out 1–18 to 0–15 winners.

==== Awards ====
He ended the year with an All Star.

=== 2020 ===
Clifford was selected as Kerry captain due to the Kerry Senior Football Championship being won by his East Kerry side.

==== National Football League ====
Kerry won the 2020 National Football League after winning 5 of their 7 matches. This was Clifford's first national league title.

==== Munster Championship ====
Clifford scored 0–04 in the shock Munster Senior Football Championship semi final loss to Cork. The 2020 championship was straight knock-out and as such was his only championship game that year.

=== 2021 ===
==== National Football League ====
Clifford scored a hat-trick against Galway in the opening round of the 2021 National Football League. Kerry would go on to share the National League title with Dublin this year delivering Clifford his second league title.

==== Munster Championship ====
Clifford won his third Munster Senior Football Championship defeating Clare (1–06), Tipperary (1–02) and Cork (0–01).

==== All-Ireland Championship ====
Kerry reached the All-Ireland semi final in which they faced Tyrone. Clifford scored 0–08 on the day, however, due to injury he could not take part in extra-time. Tyrone ran out winners 3–14 to 0–22.

==== Awards ====
He ended the year with an All Star.

=== 2022 ===
==== National Football League ====
Clifford won his third National League to start the inter county season. In the final versus Mayo he scored 1–06, 1–05 from play.

==== Munster Championship ====
His fourth Munster championship arrived in 2022. In the semi-final he scored 0–04 however, injury prevented Clifford from playing in the final versus Limerick.

==== All-Ireland Championship ====
The All-Ireland quarter final versus Mayo saw Clifford return from injury. He scored 1–03 in the win. A semi final win over Dublin was secured on the back of his 0–06.

Clifford scored 0–08 against Galway in the 2022 All-Ireland Senior Football Championship Final and in the process won his first All-Ireland Senior Football Championship. He was chosen as man of the match due to his performance.

==== Awards ====
He won his fourth All Star and was selected as GAA/GPA Footballer of the Year and The Sunday Game Footballer of the Year.

=== 2023 ===
Clifford was selected as captain for the 2023 season.

==== National Football League ====
He made his season debut as a second-half substitute in Kerry's round 3 league match against Mayo. He played in 5 league games as Kerry finished 5th in the Division 1 league.

==== Munster Championship ====
Clifford was named at full forward for their Munster semi-final against Tipperary. He scored 0–02 in their 0–25 to 0–05 win.

Clifford was awarded the man of the match award in their Munster final against Clare. He scored 2–06 in their 5–14 to 0–15 win. He played in the match alongside brother Paudie as a tribute to their mother, Ellen Clifford, who died the previous day.

==== All-Ireland Championship ====
In Kerry's first All-Ireland round robin match versus Mayo, Clifford scored 0–08 (0-03f) in a Kerry loss. Clifford scored 1–05 (1–00p, 0-01f) in their second round win versus Cork. He scored 2-04 (1-00p) in their final round robin win versus Louth. This guaranteed Kerry top spot and direct progress to the quarter finals.

Clifford contributed 0-05 (0-03f) in the All-Ireland quarter final victory over Tyrone. Kerry winning on a score line of 2–18 to 0–12.

A man of the match performance in the All Ireland Semi Final ensured Kerry's progress. He contributed 0-09 (0-04f) in a 1–17 to 1–15 win.

In the All-Ireland Final, it was Dublin who emerged victorious on a score line of 1–15 to 1–13. Clifford scored 0-03 (0-01f) in his tussle with Mick Fitzsimmons.

==== Awards ====
Clifford won his fifth All Star and was selected as GAA/GPA Footballer of the Year for a second time. He became the first player to win back to back Footballer of the Year awards. With the win he also joined at the time, Trevor Giles and Brian Fenton as the only players to win multiple awards.

=== 2024 ===
==== National Football League ====
Kerry finished third in the National League with Clifford featuring in six games and scoring 1–25 in the process.

==== Munster Championship ====
Clifford won his sixth Munster medal, scoring 0–04 in the semi-final against Cork and 0–04 against Clare in the final.

==== All-Ireland Championship ====
In the All-Ireland group stage, Clifford scored 0–05 against Monaghan, 2–02 against Meath and 0–07 against Louth.

Kerry progressed through the All-Ireland Quarter-Final against Derry, with Clifford scoring 0-03. In the All-Ireland Semi-Final versus Armagh, Clifford contributed 0–04 as Kerry exited the championship to Armagh after extra time.

=== 2025 ===
==== National Football League ====
Clifford won his fourth National League. He scored 3-22 across five Division 1 group fixtures. His 0–8 in the final against Mayo assisted Kerry in becoming the first team to win the Corn Mhichíl Uí Mhuircheartaigh, named for Mícheál Ó Muircheartaigh.

==== Munster Championship ====
Clifford won his seventh Munster medal, scoring 0–09 against Cork in the semi-final and 2–05 against Clare in the final.

==== All-Ireland Championship ====
In Kerry's first All-Ireland group match versus Roscommon, Clifford scored 1–3 in a 3–18 to 0–17 win. In a 1–28 to 0-20 second round win versus Cork, Clifford scored 1-08. In their final group game, Clifford scored 0–05 as Kerry lost 1–22 to 0–16 to Meath.

In the preliminary quarter-final win against Cavan, Clifford scored 3–07 in a man of the match performance. After the Cavan game, Clifford issued a rallying call to the Kerry supporters. “I’d like to call for our supporters to get behind us. I’m not sure they realise the impact they can have on us in Croke Park. When we hear that Kerry crowd behind you it’s worth five and six points to you in a game.”

On their return to Croke Park Kerry knocked out reigning champions Armagh in the All-Ireland Quarter-Final. In a 15-minute spell in the second half, Kerry scored 0-14 without reply. Clifford contributed 0–07 in a 0–32 to 1–21 win. In the All-Ireland semi-final versus Tyrone Clifford scored 1–09 as Kerry progressed to the final on a 1–20 to 0–17 scoreline.

On the 27th of July, Clifford won his second All-Ireland medal with a 1–26 to 0–19 win over Donegal. He did not touch the ball for the first 9 minutes of the match, however with his first touch he scored a 2-pointer and contributed 0-07 from 6 possessions in the first half. He scored 0–09 in total with all his scores coming from play.

Remarking on the new rules implemented for the 2025 season, Clifford offered the view that "it brought a great freshness to the game; it brought people back talking about and watching the game… teams go for it. Teams have a crack off it. That is all we want to see, really, in the game… seeing the new rules and looking back, you're probably saying this is a bit more enjoyable".

He scored 8-62 (8-48 from play) over the course of 9 championship matches, finishing as the leading 2025 championship scorer in points, goals, 2-pointers, from play and in total.

==== Awards ====
The Sunday Game panel awarded him his second Footballer of the Year and a place on his fifth Team of the Year.

On 7 November 2025, Clifford made history as he won a record breaking third GAA/GPA Footballer of the Year and his sixth All Star.

=== 2026 ===
Clifford made his seasonal debut in the 0–16 to 0-15 McGrath Cup loss to Cork.

==== National Football League ====
Clifford scored 1–08 in Kerry's opening round 2–18 to 1–20 win against Roscommon. This was followed by 1–06 against Galway in their draw in Austin Stack Park. Playing in his first away league game of the season, Clifford contributed 0–04 in a win against Dublin. In a Round 5 win versus Monaghan, Clifford was introduced as a second-half substitute, scoring 1-03. In a dominant Round 6 home win against Mayo, Clifford scored 0–09 in a 2–29 to 0–19 win. Kerry secured their place in the Division 1 final thanks to a 0–24 to 1–21 draw in round 7 against Armagh, Clifford contributed 0–10. Donegal produced a clinical league final display in Croke Park, defeating Kerry 3–20 to 2–10. Caolan McColgan was tasked with man-marking duties and limited Clifford to 1-01. Clifford finished the league as Division 1 top scorer with 4-41, including 3-35 from play.

==== Munster Championship ====
In the Munster semi-final in Ennis, Kerry beat Clare on a 2–19 to 1–14 scoreline. Clifford started corner-forward and contributed 1–07 before receiving a black card in the 66th minute.

Kerry dispatched of Cork in the Munster final in Fitzgerald Stadium on a scoreline of 1–23 to 1–15. Clifford was named as captain on the day due to the absence of team captain Paul Geaney and contributed 1–06 in a man of the match display. With the win Kerry became the inaugural winners of the Corn Pháidí Uí Shé, recently named in honour of Kerry great, Páidí Ó Sé.

==== All-Ireland Championship ====
In a repeat of the 2025 All-Ireland final and 2026 league final, Kerry were drawn at home to face Donegal in Round 1 of the revamped All-Ireland Football Championship. Clifford scored 0–04 as Donegal won 2–20 to 0–16 in a dominant display. The match was overshadowed by a half-time melee and a number of smaller flashpoints during the game.

As a result of their loss to Donegal, Kerry were drawn on to the losers side of the All-Ireland draw. In Round 2B they beat Kildare in St. Conleth's Park by 3–22 to 0–17 with Clifford scoring 1-04, all from play.

Kerry received a home draw in Round 3 as they were drawn against the 2024 All-Ireland champions Armagh. Clifford scored 1-10 and was named man of the match as Kerry kept alive their All-Ireland title defence with a commanding 13-point victory.

Kerry faced Tyrone in the All-Ireland Quarter-Final in Croke Park. Kerry won 2–25 to 0–27 with Clifford ‘stamping his brilliance on the contest’, contributing 1-08, winning the final kick out and providing the assist for the game-winning goal in the dying seconds.

In the All-Ireland Final, Clifford scored 1–06 with it all coming from play. Despite finishing as top scorer in the match, Mayo ended their 75-year wait for Sam Maguire winning by 1–20 to 1–17.

Clifford finished the year as top scorer in total and from play. He also overtook Colm Cooper to become the top Kerry scorer in All-Ireland Senior Football Championship history and the second highest scorer overall behind Cillian O'Connor.

==== Awards ====
Following Kerry's All-Ireland Final loss to Mayo, Clifford was selected at corner-forward in The Sunday Game Team of the Year and finished as runner-up to Ryan O'Donoghue for Footballer of the Year. He won his seventh All-Star on the 30th of October, he was unable to attend the ceremony due to his presence on the Kerry team holiday. He was named on the three man shortlist for the GAA/GPA Footballer of the Year, with Ryan O'Donoghue winning the award.

== Fossa ==
=== Kerry, Munster & All-Ireland Junior Wins ===
A week after his first All-Ireland win with Kerry, Clifford scored 1–9 versus Listowel Emmets. In his second match of the 2022 club championship, he again scored 1–9 versus Castlegregory. In their third group match he scored 0–10 against Listry. Against Annascaul in the quarter-final he scored 1–6 in Fossa's victory. In their semi final win over Ardfert, he contributed 0–9 of their 0–14 total. The Junior Premier final brought Fossa and Listry together again. In Fossa's 4–15 to 0–22 win, Clifford scored 2–12.

Fossa went on to win the 2022 Munster Junior club football championship. Clifford scoring 0–04 (0-02f) versus Feohanagh-Castlemahon (Limerick) and 0–10 (0-07f) in the final versus Kilmurry (Cork).

In the All-Ireland series Clifford scored 0–07 (0-01f) in the semi-final versus Castletown from Meath.

He guided Fossa to their first All-Ireland Junior win in a man of the match performance versus Stewartstown Harps GFC. He scored 0–11 (0-03f) and was sent off in the dying moments having received a second yellow card.

=== Intermediate Championship ===
==== 2023 ====
Fossa were promoted to the Intermediate Championship for 2023. Clifford scored 0–07 against An Ghaeltacht, 0–07 against St Mary's, 0–05 against Glenflesk and 1–07 against Castleisland Desmonds in the quarter-final.

In the semi-final he scored 0–13 against Austin Stacks in a normal time draw. Clifford scored the opening penalty in the shootout as Fossa reached their first ever intermediate final. Milltown/Castlemaine were the opponents in the final, Clifford scored 0–12 in a 2–13 to 0–18 loss.

==== 2024 ====
In the group stage, Clifford scored 0–04 against Beaufort, 1–09 against Castleisland Desmonds and 1–06 against Ballydonoghue.

A second-place finish in the group led Fossa to quarter-final against Kerins O'Rahilly's, Clifford scored in 0–05 in a four-point win. A semi-final with Laune Rangers ended in a 3–11 to 1–19 loss. Cifford scored a remarkable 3–08 on the day.

==== 2025 ====
In their opening group match, Fossa defeated John Mitchels 2–19 to 1–11 with Clifford contributing 1-08 (0-01f). In their next group game Fossa defeated Firies 4–16 to 0–18, with Clifford scoring 0-09 (0-04tpf). With both teams already qualified for the quarter-final, the final round clash with Kilcummin was to decide who topped the group. Kilcummin won 0–22 to 0–10, Clifford scoring 0-05 (0-01f).

In their quarter-final away to Beaufort, Clifford scored 0–04 as Fossa won 2–11 to 0–15. The semi-final brought Fossa and Kilcummin back together. Fossa reversed the result from the group stage, winning 3–14 to 0–20 with Clifford scoring 1-05.

Fossa lost their second intermediate final in three years as An Ghaeltacht triumphed on a 0–19 to 1–11 scoreline. Clifford contributed 0–07 in the losing effort.

==== Kerry Intermediate Football Championship ====
In their opening championship game against Gneeveguilla, Clifford scored 0–11 in a 1–28 to 1–17 win. Clifford contributed 1–02 in their Round 2 win over Glenbeigh/Glencar. Fossa sealed top spot with a final round win over Ballymacelligott, Clifford scoring 0-06. Clifford contributed 0–12 in their Round quarter final win over Listowel Emmets. Clifford kicked the winning point and 0–16 in total in the extra-time semi-final win over Beaufort.

Fossa won their first ever Kerry Intermediate Football Championship thanks to a 0–26 to 0–22 win over Kilcummin. In a man of the match display Clifford scored 0–15 as Fossa secured senior club status in Kerry for the first time in their history. The win came on the back of final defeats in 2023 and 2025.

==== Munster Intermediate Club Football Championship ====
Fossa entered the Munster Championship at the semi-final stage and were drawn against The Banner, the Clare Intermediate champions. Clifford scored 1-03 in a 2-13 to 0-13 win at Fossa’s home ground.

Fossa played Uíbh Laoire (Cork) in the Munster Final.

== East Kerry ==
Clifford plays with East Kerry in the Kerry Senior Football Championship.

At underage level he won two Kerry Minor Football Championship titles in 2016 and 2017. He won a Kerry Under-21 Football Championship title in 2018.

He is four time county champion, winning in 2019, 2020, 2022 and 2023.

=== 2019 ===
In 2019 he scored 1–06 in the quarter-final, 0–09 in the semi-final and 1–03 in the final.

=== 2020 ===
In 2020 he scored 1–05 in the quarter-final and 1–04 in the final.

=== 2021 ===
In 2021, a straight knock out championship was in place. Clifford scored 0–02 as East Kerry lost to eventual champions Austin Stacks.

=== 2022 ===
Clifford made his 2022 debut as a substitute in the win against Spa. He scored 0–3 after being introduced in the 40th minute. He scored 0–07 in the quarter final versus Kenmare Shamrocks. He won his third Kerry Senior Football Championship beating Mid Kerry in the final, scoring 1–09 in the process.

=== 2023 ===
In 2023, Clifford made his debut in a ten-minute cameo against Templenoe. He started the quarter final against St. Kierans and scored 1–05 in a 4–19 to 0–12 win. His 1-03 helped ensure progression to the Kerry senior final at the expense of Rathmore on a score line of 1–16 to 1–10. East Kerry defeated Mid Kerry 2–10 to 0–15 in the final with Clifford contributing 0-03.

=== 2024 ===
East Kerry began their 2024 campaign against Rathmore, Clifford scored 1–07 in 4–16 to 2–12 win. In Round 2, Milltown/Castlemaine were defeated 0–16 to 0–06 with Clifford contributing 0-04. In the Quarter-Final against St Kieran's, Clifford scored 0–06 in a 1–14 to 1–12 win. East Kerry's title defence ended at the Semi-Final stage, in an extra-time loss Clifford scored 1–02 as Kerry fell to Dingle on a 2–16 to 1–14 scoreline.

=== 2025 ===
In the preliminary stage, Clifford scored 1–05 in a 2–18 to 1–10 win against St Kieran's. Clifford contributed 0–05 as East Kerry won their 2025 first round clash against Templenoe 3–23 to 1–10. East Kerry were knocked out at the quarter-final stage by Rathmore in a sensational 1–20 to 0–09 loss. Clifford scored 0–05 as Rathmore scored 14 unanswered points in the second half.

=== 2026 ===
Clifford scored a last minute two-point free to send East Kerry into the quarter final as they accounted for Mid Kerry. Clifford contributed 1–06 in a 1–12 to 1–11 win. East Kerry lost their quarter final to Spa, 3–15 to 2–17. Clifford scoring 2–04 in his last East Kerry outing at senior championship level due to Fossa's Intermediate championship win earlier in the season.

== Underage career ==
=== Schools ===
Clifford first came to prominence when he scored 2–05 in the Hogan Cup final 2016 as St Brendan's College, Killarney saw off St Patrick's College, Maghera to deliver their first title in 24 years.

=== Minor ===
Clifford made his debut on the inter-county scene at the age of sixteen when he was selected for the Kerry minor team. He enjoyed two championship seasons with the minor team and won back-to-back Munster and All-Ireland medals in 2016 and 2017.

He was captain of the 2017 winning teams scoring 6–27 in six games, including 4–04 in the All-Ireland final win over Derry. He ended the 2017 season as the Minor Footballer of the Year.

=== Soccer ===
In addition to Gaelic football, Clifford also played underage soccer, as a centre-half. The future professional English Football League players Shane McLoughlin and Dara O'Shea alongside future musician Ryan Meaney were his opponents at under-age level.

== Player Profile ==
=== Transition from underage to senior ===
Clifford was marked out as an underage star during his Kerry minor career and according to the Irish Times was ‘widely expected to be a mainstay in the senior county team for years to come’.

=== Comparisons ===
Clifford's skill set has been compared to a range of Kerry greats. Irish Independent journalist Frank Roche noted his similarities to three players from the great Kerry team of the 1970s and 80's, Eoin Liston’s aerial ability, the athleticism and pace of Pat Spillane and the goal threat of John Egan. From the 1990s on, the vision of Maurice Fitzgerald, two footed ability of Mike Frank Russell and the left foot, balance and evasion of Colm Cooper.

Conor McKeon of the Irish Independent has compared Clifford to Lionel Messi and in particular their shared disposition in the initial stages of matches to walking around the pitch as they observe defensive structures and patterns. This was particularly evident in the 2025 All-Ireland Senior Football Championship final as Clifford did not touch the ball in the first 9 minutes of the match before scoring 0-09.

This sentiment was echoed by Declan Bogue in The 42, ‘he walked around Croke Park with same mastery of his surroundings as Lionel Messi, choosing when to make his interventions’.

=== Movement ===
Former GAA/GPA Footballer of the Year James O'Donoghue described Clifford as playing from a low, hunched position, combining footwork, pace, balance and strength to evade defenders or hold them at arm's length.

Broadcaster and former Kerry captain Dara Ó Cinnéide remarked that he saw ‘this kind of quick-step that Clifford has, and…just went, ‘Holy f**k! What is he doing there?…that’s where I am with Clifford. I want to be at these games where I’m just saying, ‘What’s he going to do today?’ And that's the privilege. And that's the thrill.’

=== Kicking ===
Clifford is known for his distinctive kicking style which physical therapist Gerard Hartmann attributed to his ‘range of motion…there is a genetic factor. We are all born with an inherited flexibility hyper mobility, which Clifford has clearly maintained’. Sports scientist and former London GAA football manager Ciarán Deely compared how Clifford adapts his kicking technique depending on distance, ‘ for closer shots, he tends to get his head and chest in over the ball to ensure optimal accuracy…(for longer shots) his right toe is barely touching the ground, his body is completely upright, even his head tilted back, and his left foot is a good six inches above his hairline. This is not the typical kicking technique!’

James O'Donoghue summarised his kicking style, ‘he puts hand to foot in terms of kicking the ball so quickly. He gets one step; he puts the hand out and it’s over the bar’.

=== Scoring ===
Clifford has produced impressive scoring feats since his underage gaelic football days, including 2–05 in the 2016 Hogan Cup final and 4–04 in the 2017 All-Ireland Minor final. Dara Ó Cinnéide noted that when ‘he's fully fit and there's a supply line there, he'll deliver because he always does.’

2024 All Star corner back Barry McCambridge remarked that ‘when David Clifford gets a score I find it almost counts as double because their fans get such a buzz out of it, so do their players.’ McCambridge also referenced Clifford's use of the backdoor cut and his goal threat, ‘he’s so good on the backdoor cut and scoring goals so you don’t want to get caught. But if you step off slightly to block out that backdoor cut that’s when he starts going into the space in front and scoring, and there’s one-point and two-point options there. It’s about weighing that up.’

=== Legacy ===
Declan Bogue of The 42 remarked that ‘we are living in the Clifford age’.

Joe Brolly stated in Gaelic Life that ‘in the modern game there are systems, strategies, tactics, statistics and there is David Clifford’.

== Personal life ==
Clifford and his girlfriend Shauna O'Connor have one son named Óigí, born in September 2021. His brother Paudie Clifford is also a member of the Kerry team and a fellow All-Ireland winner.

He studied in Institute of Technology, Tralee and graduated with a degree in health and leisure. In August 2022, he graduated with a Masters in PE teaching at the University of Limerick. Clifford is a teacher in his alma mater St Brendan's College, Killarney.

He supports Celtic.

In November 2025, Clifford became the first Gaelic games player to release his own brand of clothing and apparel. In collaboration with McKeever Sports, Clifford released an apparel range complete with a logo featuring the ‘iconic Clifford kicking image with his left leg cocked up in the air beside his left ear’.

In October 2026, Clifford and McKeever Sports expanded his range through the introduction of Clifford branded football boots for adults and children. The ad campaign for the boots carried the slogan, ‘Kick Like Clifford’. Clifford noted during the launch that ‘to have a boot with my name on it, that young players can lace up and go practise in is a brilliant feeling…it’s always been about the training and the repetition, and if these boots get a few more kids out there bettering themselves, that means a lot’.

== Career statistics ==
Legend
	Won Competition
**Bold**	Career high

=== Inter-county ===
As of match played 26 July 2026

Team	Year	McGrath Cup		National League			Munster		All-Ireland		Total	
Team	Year	Apps	Score	Division	Apps	Score	Apps	Score	Apps	Score	Apps	Score
Kerry Minor	2016	—					3	1–14	3	1–13	6	2–27
Kerry Minor	2017	—					3	3–18	3	5–23	6	8–41
Kerry Minor	Total	—					6	4–32	6	6–36	12	10–68
Kerry	2018	—		Division 1	6	0–21	2	0-04	3	4–14	11	4–39
Kerry	2019	—		Division 1	2	0–07	2	0–07	5	0–22	9	0–36
Kerry	2020	—		Division 1	7	2–32	1	0–04	—		8	2–36
Kerry	2021	—		Division 1	4	6–22	3	2–09	1	0–08	8	8–39
Kerry	2022	2	1-06	Division 1	8	5–28	1	0–04	3	1–17	14	7–55
Kerry	2023	—		Division 1	5	1–14	2	2–08	6	3–34	13	6–56
Kerry	2024	—		Division 1	6	1–25	2	0–08	5	2–21	13	3–54
Kerry	2025	—		Division 1	6	3–30	2	2–14	7	6–48	15	11–92
Kerry	2026	1	0-01	Division 1	7	4–41	2	2–13	6	5–37	16	11–92
Kerry	2027	—		Division 1	0	0-00	0	0–00	0	0–00	0	0–00
Kerry	Total	3	1-07		52	23–238	17	8–71	36	21–201	108	53–507

All-Ireland Senior Football Championship Scoring Total
Scores (Total)	Scores (Play)	Games	Average
29–272 (359pts)	25-177 (252 pts)	53	6.8

=== Club ===
As of 21 November 2026

Fossa GAA
Year	Championship	Apps	Score
2017	Junior Premier	2	2-04
2018	Junior Premier	2	3-02
2019	Junior Premier	3	2–11
2020	Junior Premier	3	1-09
2021	Junior Premier	4	3–15
2022	Junior Premier	**6**	**5–55**
2022	Munster Junior	2	0–14
2023	All-Ireland Junior	2	0–18
2023	Intermediate	6	1-51
2024	Intermediate	5	5-32
2025	Intermediate	6	2-38
2026	Intermediate	6	1-62
2026	Munster Intermediate	1	1-03
Career	Total	48	26-314

=== Division ===
As of 11 October 2026

Kerry SFC
Divisional Side	Year	Apps	Score
East Kerry	2017	4	2-01
East Kerry	2018	4	5–13
East Kerry	2019	5	2–29
East Kerry	2020	3	2–15
East Kerry	2021	1	0-02
East Kerry	2022	5	2–24
East Kerry	2023	3	2–08
East Kerry	2024	4	2–19
East Kerry	2025	3	1–15
East Kerry	2026	2	3–10
Career total		34	21–136

=== College ===
Sigerson Cup
Year	College	Appearances	Score
2018	IT Tralee	1	1–04
2019	IT Tralee	0	0–00
2020	IT Tralee	1	0–05
2021	University of Limerick	0	0–00
2022	University of Limerick	6	6–21
Career	Total	8	7-30

== Championship appearances ==
List of appearances
	Date	Venue	Opponent	Score	Result	W/L/D	Competition
1	3 June 2018	Fitzgerald Stadium	Clare	0–02	0–32 : 0–10	W	Munster Semi-Final
2	18 June 2018	Páirc Uí Chaoimh	Cork	0–02	3–18 : 2–04	W	Munster Final
3	15 July 2018	Croke Park	Galway	1–05	1–10 : 1–13	L	Super 8's Round 1
4	22 July 2018	St Tiernach's Park	Monaghan	1–03	1–17 : 1–17	D	Super 8's Round 2
5	5 August 2018	Fitzgerald Stadium	Kildare	2–06	3–25 : 2–16	W	Super 8's Round 3
6	1 June 2019	Cusack Park	Clare	0-03	1–15 : 0–12	W	Munster Semi-final
7	22 June 2019	Páirc Uí Chaoimh	Cork	0–04	1–19 : 3–10	W	Munster Final
8	14 July 2019	Fitzgerald Stadium	Mayo	0–07	1–22 : 1–15	W	Super 8's Round 1
9	21 July 2019	Croke Park	Donegal	0–03	1–20 : 1–20	D	Super 8's Round 2
10	14 July 2019	Croke Park	Tyrone	0–05	1–18 : 0–18	W	All-Ireland Semi-Final
11	1 September 2019	Croke Park	Dublin	0–02	1–16 : 1–16	D	All-Ireland Final
12	14 September 2019	Croke Park	Dublin	0–05	0–15 : 1–18	L	All-Ireland Final
13	8 November 2020	Páirc Uí Chaoimh	Cork	0–04	0–13 : 1–12	L	Munster Semi-Final
14	21 June 2021	Fitzgerald Stadium	Clare	1–06	3–22 : 1–11	W	Munster Quarter-Final
15	10 July 2021	Semple Stadium	Tipperary	1–02	1–19 : 1–08	W	Munster Semi-Final
16	25 July 2021	Fitzgerald Stadium	Cork	0–01	4–22 : 1–09	W	Munster Final
17	28 August 2021	Croke Park	Tyrone	0–08	0–22 : 3–14	L	All-Ireland Semi-Final
18	7 May 2022	Páirc Uí Rinn	Cork	0–04	0–23 : 0–11	W	Munster Semi-Final
19	26 June 2022	Croke Park	Mayo	1–03	1–18 : 0–13	W	All-Ireland Quarter-Final
20	10 July 2022	Croke Park	Dublin	0–06	1–14 : 1–13	W	All-Ireland Semi-Final
21	24 July 2022	Croke Park	Galway	0–08	0–20 : 0–16	W	All-Ireland Final
22	22 April 2023	Fitzgerald Stadium	Tipperary	0–02	0–25 : 0–05	W	Munster Semi-Final
23	7 May 2023	Gaelic Grounds	Clare	2-06	5–14 : 0–15	W	Munster Final
24	20 May 2023	Fitzgerald Stadium	Mayo	0–08	0–17 : 1–19	L	All-Ireland Group
25	3 June 2023	Páirc Uí Chaoimh	Cork	1-05	1–14 : 0–15	W	All-Ireland Group
26	18 June 2023	O'Moore Park	Louth	2-04	5–24 : 0–11	W	All-Ireland Group
27	1 July 2023	Croke Park	Tyrone	0-05	2–18 : 0–12	W	All-Ireland Quarter-Final
28	16 July 2023	Croke Park	Derry	0-09	1–17 : 1–15	W	All-Ireland Semi-Final
29	30 July 2023	Croke Park	Dublin	0-03	1–13 : 1–15	L	All-Ireland Final
30	20 April 2024	Fitzgerald Stadium	Cork	0-04	0–18 : 1–12	W	Munster Semi-Final
31	5 May 2024	Cusack Park	Clare	0-04	0–23 : 1–13	W	Munster Final
32	18 May 2024	Fitzgerald Stadium	Monaghan	0-05	0–24 : 1–11	W	All-Ireland Group
33	2 June 2024	Páirc Tailteann	Meath	2-02	2–18 : 0–09	W	All-Ireland Group
34	16 June 2024	O'Moore Park	Louth	0-07	2–21 : 1–10	W	All-Ireland Group
35	30 June 2024	Croke Park	Derry	0-03	0–15 : 0–10	W	All-Ireland Quarter-Final
36	13 July 2024	Croke Park	Armagh	0-04	1–16 : 1–18	L	All-Ireland Semi-Final
37	19 April 2025	Páirc Uí Chaoimh	Cork	0-09	3–21 : 1–25	W	Munster Semi-Final
38	4 May 2025	Fitzgerald Stadium	Clare	2-05	4–20 : 0–21	W	Munster Final
39	17 May 2025	Fitzgerald Stadium	Roscommon	1-03	3–18 : 0–17	W	All-Ireland Group
40	31 May 2025	Páirc Uí Chaoimh	Cork	1-08	1–28 : 0–20	W	All-Ireland Group
41	14 June 2025	O’Connor Park	Meath	0-05	0–16 : 1–22	L	All-Ireland Group
42	21 June 2025	Fitzgerald Stadium	Cavan	3-07	3–20 : 1–17	W	All-Ireland Preliminary Quarter-Final
43	29 June 2025	Croke Park	Armagh	0-07	0–32 : 1–21	W	All-Ireland Quarter-Final
44	12 July 2025	Croke Park	Tyrone	1-09	1–20 : 0–17	W	All-Ireland Semi-Final
45	27 July 2025	Croke Park	Donegal	0-09	1–26 : 0–19	W	All-Ireland Final
46	25 April 2026	Cusack Park	Clare	1-07	2–19 : 1–14	W	Munster Semi-Final
47	10 May 2026	Fitzgerald Stadium	Cork	1-06	1–23 : 1–15	W	Munster Final
48	23 May 2026	Fitzgerald Stadium	Donegal	0-04	0–16 : 2–20	L	All-Ireland Round 1
49	13 June 2026	St Conleth's Park	Kildare	1-04	3–22 : 0–17	W	All-Ireland Round 2B
50	20 June 2026	Fitzgerald Stadium	Armagh	1–10	4–18 : 0–17	W	All-Ireland Round 3
51	27 June 2026	Croke Park	Tyrone	1-08	2–25 : 0–27	W	All-Ireland Quarter-Final
52	12 July 2026	Croke Park	Dublin	1-05	2–18 : 0–20	W	All-Ireland Semi-Final
53	26 July 2026	Croke Park	Mayo	1-06	1–17 : 1–20	L	All-Ireland Final

== All-Ireland Final Statistics ==
=== All-Ireland Final scores ===
List of appearances
#	Date	Venue	Opponent	Score	Play	W/L	Result
1	1 September 2019	Croke Park	Dublin	0–02	0–02	D	1–16 : 1–16
2	14 September 2019	Croke Park	Dublin	0–05	0–04	L	0–15 : 1–18
3	24 July 2022	Croke Park	Galway	0–08	0–03	W	0–20 : 0–16
4	30 July 2023	Croke Park	Dublin	0–03	0–01	L	1–13 : 1–15
5	27 July 2025	Croke Park	Donegal	0–09	0–09	W	1–26 : 0–19
6	26 July 2026	Croke Park	Mayo	1–06	1–06	L	1–17 : 1–20

All-Ireland Senior Football Finals Scoring Total
Scores (Total)	Scores (Play)	Games	Average
1–33 (36pts)	1–25 (28pts)	6 games	6

== Honours ==
Kerry

- All-Ireland Senior Football Championship
  - (2): 2022, 2025
- Munster Senior Football Championship
  - (8): 2018, 2019, 2021, 2022, 2023 (c), 2024, 2025, 2026
- National Football League
  - (4): 2020 (c), 2021 (jc), 2022, 2025
- All-Ireland Minor Football Championship
  - (2): 2016, 2017 (c)
- Munster Minor Football Championship
  - (2): 2016, 2017 (c)
- McGrath Cup
  - (1): 2022

Fossa

- All-Ireland Junior Club Football Championship
  - (1): 2023
- Munster Junior Club Football Championship
  - (1): 2022
- Kerry Intermediate Football Championship
  - (1): 2026
- Kerry Premier Junior Football Championship
  - (1): 2022

East Kerry

- Kerry Senior Football Championship
  - (4): 2019, 2020, 2022, 2023
- Kerry Under-21 Football Championship
  - (1): 2018
- Kerry Minor Football Championship
  - (2): 2016, 2017

St Brendan's College

- Hogan Cup
  - (1): 2016
- Corn Uí Mhuirí
  - (1): 2016

Individual

- GAA/GPA Footballer of the Year
  - (3): 2022, 2023, 2025
  - (Shortlist): 2026
- GAA/GPA Young Footballer of the Year
  - (1): 2018
- All Star
  - (7): 2018, 2019, 2021, 2022, 2023, 2025, 2026
- GAA Minor Star Footballer of the Year
  - (1): 2017
- Minor All-Star Award
  - (1): 2017
- All-Ireland Senior Football Championship Final Man of the Match
  - (1): 2022
- The Sunday Game Team of the Year
  - (6): 2018, 2021, 2022, 2023, 2025, 2026
- The Sunday Game Footballer of the Year
  - (2): 2022, 2025
  - (Shortlist): 2023, 2026
- Higher Education Rising Star Footballer of the Year
  - (1): 2022
- Sigerson Cup Team of the Year
  - (1): 2022

== Gallery ==
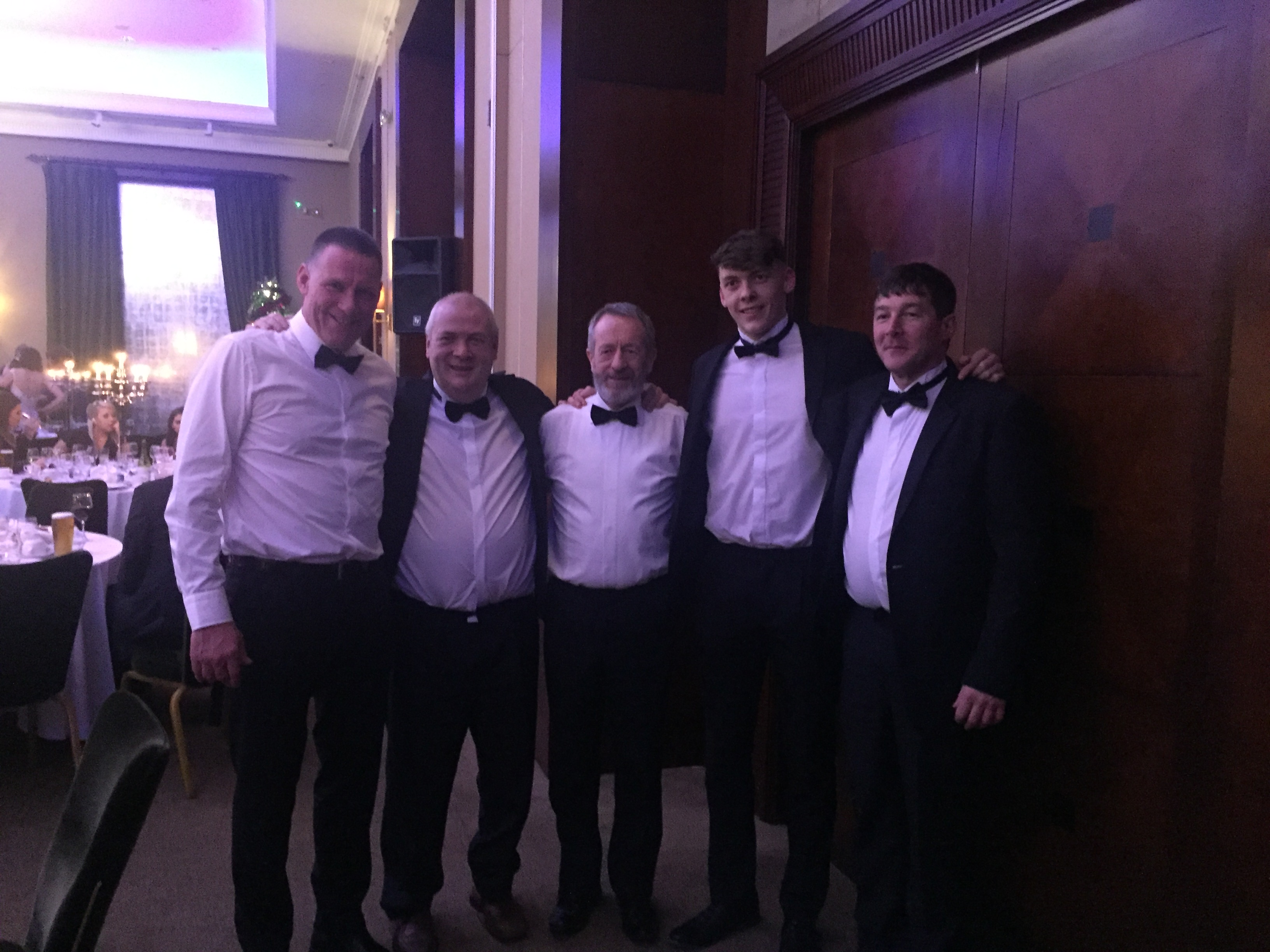
From left to right: Templenoe's Tom Spillane, Fossa chairman Dermot Clifford, former GAA president Seán Kelly, David Clifford and Fossa secretary Merry Talbot, in 2017.

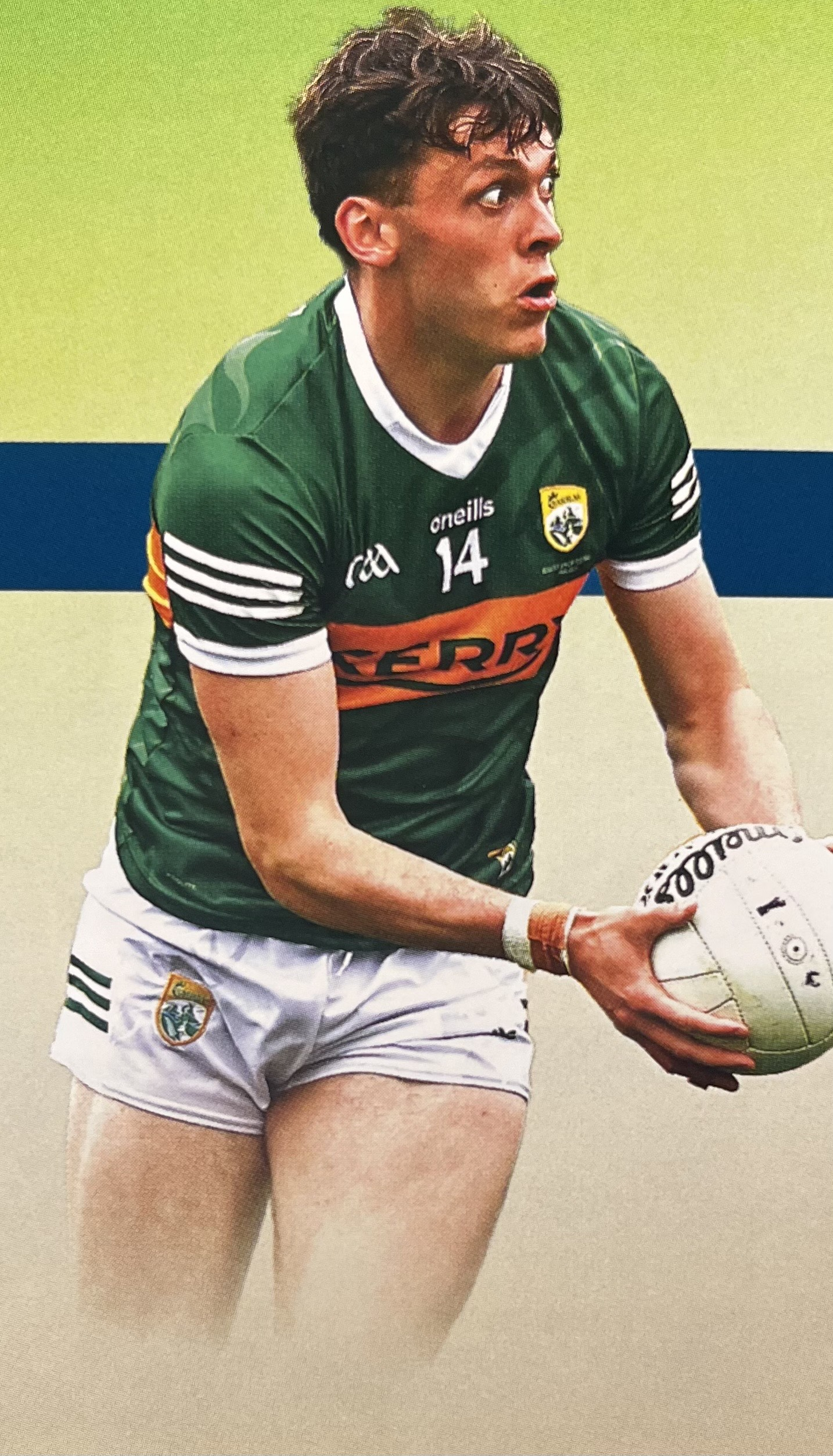
David Clifford in 2023.

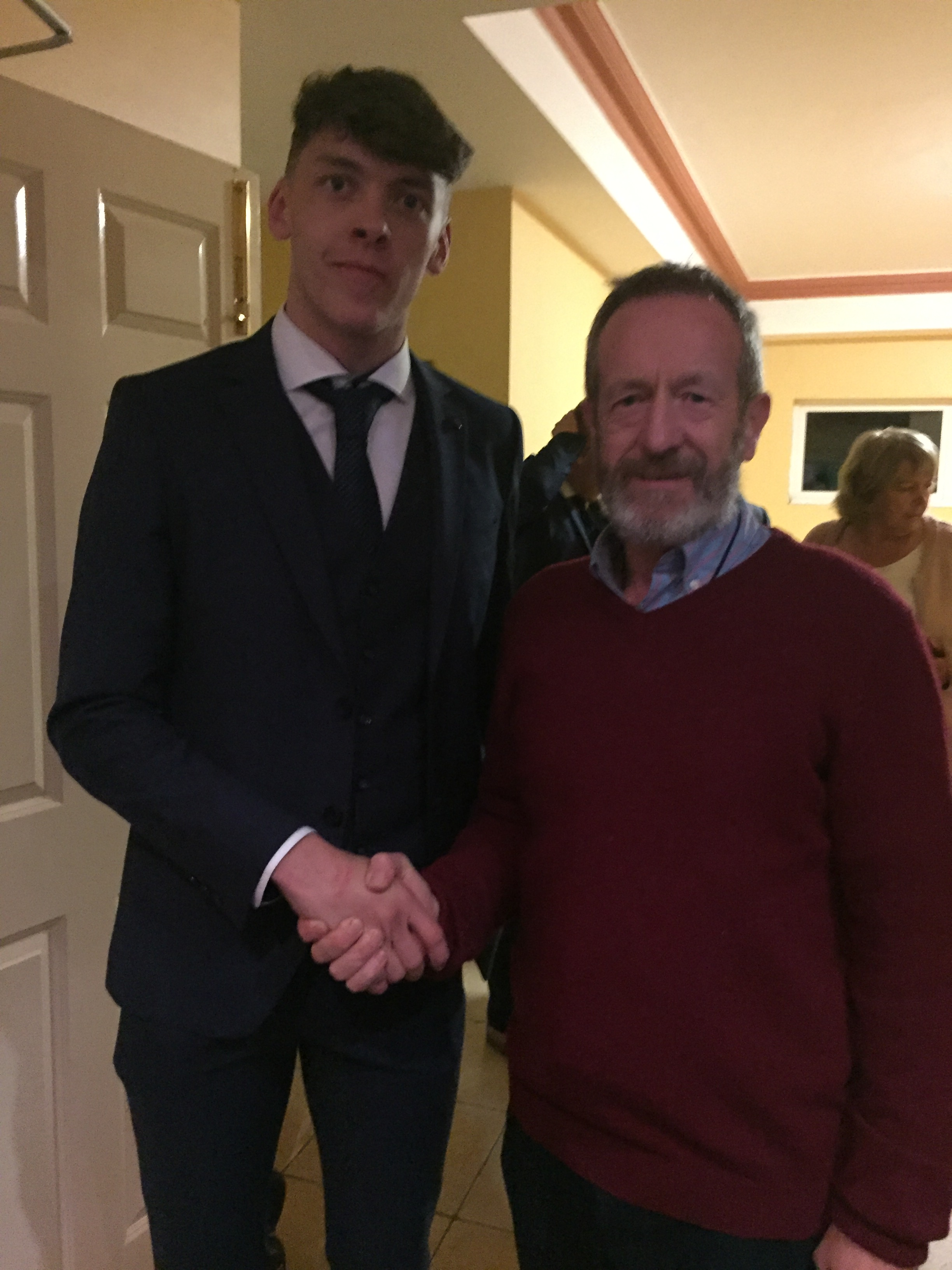
David Clifford (left) with former Uachtarán Cumann Lúthchleas Gael Seán Kelly in 2017.

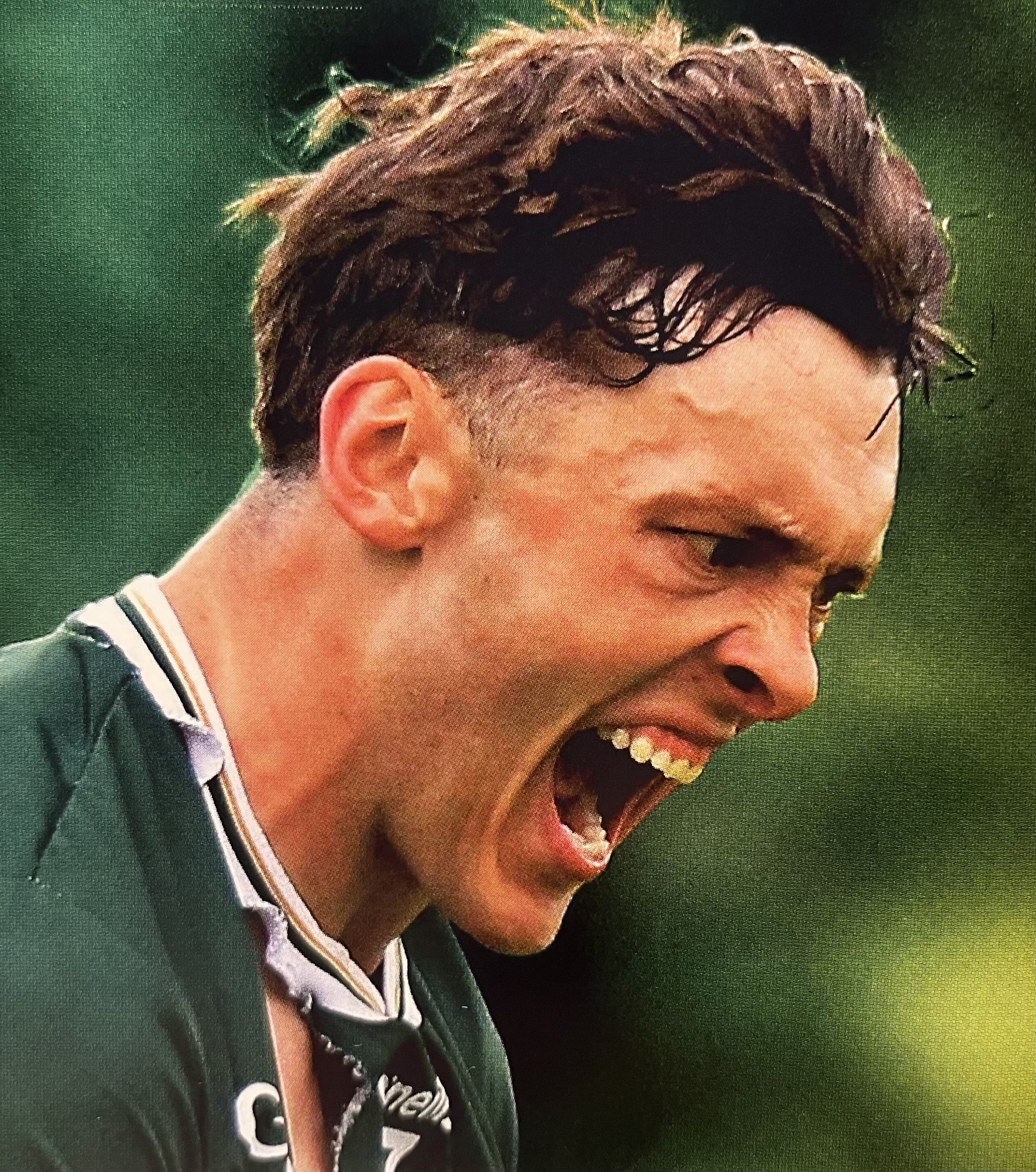
David Clifford celebrating a goal versus Cavan in 2025.

Awards and achievements
Preceded by Seán O'Shea	All-Ireland MFC winning captain 2017	Succeeded by Paul O'Shea
Preceded by Con O'Callaghan	GAA/GPA Young Footballer of the Year; 2018	Succeeded by Seán O'Shea
Preceded by Kieran McGeary	GAA/GPA Footballer of the Year; 2022, 2023	Succeeded by Paul Conroy
Preceded by Paul Conroy	GAA/GPA Footballer of the Year; 2025	Succeeded by Incumbent
Sporting positions
Preceded by Seán O'Shea	Kerry Minor Football Captain; 2017	Succeeded by Paul O'Shea
Preceded by Gavin White	Kerry Senior Football Captain; 2020	Succeeded by Paul Murphy
Preceded by Seán O'Shea	Kerry Senior Football Captain; 2023	Succeeded by Incumbent
