= 2017 All-Ireland Minor Football Championship =

Gaelic football competition

All-Ireland Minor Football Championship 2017
Championship details
- Dates: April – 17 September 2017
- Teams: 31

All-Ireland Champions
- Winning team: Kerry (15th win)
- Captain: David Clifford
- Manager: Peter Keane

All-Ireland Finalists
- Losing team: Derry
- Captain: Padraig McGrogan
- Manager: Damian McErlain

Provincial Champions
- Munster: Kerry
- Leinster: Dublin
- Ulster: Derry
- Connacht: Galway

Championship statistics
- Player of the Year: David Clifford

The 2017 All-Ireland Minor Football Championship was the GAA's premier inter-county gaelic football competition for under 18's. 31 county teams from Ireland competed (Kilkenny did not participate).

2017 was the final year of this competition with an under 18 age limit; an under 17 championship with a new format replaced it after a vote at the GAA congress on 26 February 2016.

The winners received the Tom Markham Cup.

Kerry won their fourth minor title in a row, defeating Derry in the final on 17 September 2017 by 6-17 to 1-08. This was the first time that any county had won four minor titles in a row.

== Teams ==
Thirty-one teams contested the championship as Kilkenny withdrew after competing in 2016. New York and London did not participate in this competition.

== Format ==
Provincial Championships

Connacht, Leinster, Munster and Ulster organised four provincial championships. Each province determined the format for deciding their champions and it could have been a league, group, knock-out, double-elimination, etc. or a combination of these. The format for the 2017 championships are explained in the sections below.

All-Ireland

The four provincial winners play the four provincial runners-up in the All-Ireland quarter finals. Two semi-finals and a final follow. The final is normally played before the All-Ireland senior final on the third Sunday in September. All these matches are knock-out.

== Provincial championships ==
=== Connacht Minor Football Championship ===
==== Connacht Format ====
All five Connacht counties competed in a straight knock-out format.

==== Connacht Main Draw ====
Quarter-finals		Semi-finals		Connacht Final
		Galway	1-13
Mayo	0-11	Roscommon	1-6
Galway	3-15			Galway	3-11
				Sligo	0-10
		Sligo	3-12
		Leitrim	3-7

==== Connacht Quarter-final ====
Quarter-final	Mayo	0-11 - 3-15	Galway	McHale Park; Referee: E O’Grady (Leitrim)
Quarter-final	John Gallagher 0-4f, Tommy Conory 0-2, Michael McGarry, Cathal Slattery, Kuba Callaghan, Dylan Prendergast, Mikie Conroy 0-1 each		Daniel Kenny 2-0, Evan Murphy 0-5 (0-4f), Rory Cunningham 0-3, Martin Kerrigan 1-0, Darragh Silke (0-2f) and Padraic Costello 0-2 each Matthias Barrett, Matthew Tierney (0-1f), Conor Campbell 0-1 each	McHale Park; Referee: E O’Grady (Leitrim)

==== Connacht Semi-finals ====
28 June 2017; Semi-final	Galway	1-13 - 1-6	Roscommon	Pearse Stadium, Salthill; Referee: Eamonn O’Grady (Leitrim)
28 June 2017; Semi-final	Conor Newell 1-0, Liam Boyle 0-3, Brian Harlowe, Darragh Silke, Padraic Costello (0-1f) 0-2 each, Eoin McFadden, Matthias Barrett, Evan Murphy (0-1f), Conor Campbell 0-1 each	Report	Brian Derwin 1-3 (0-2f), Ronan Dowd 0-2, Sean Henry 0-1	Pearse Stadium, Salthill; Referee: Eamonn O’Grady (Leitrim)

28 June 2017; Semi-final	Sligo	3-12 - 3-7	Leitrim	Markievicz Park; Referee: Liam Devenney (Mayo)
28 June 2017; Semi-final	Red Og Murphy 1-2 (0-2f), Conall Ryan 0-4, Evan Lavin and Ryan Walsh 1-1 each, Luke Towey 0-2, Barry Gorman and Roland Anderson 0-1	Report	Oisin McLoughlin 2-1 (0-1f), Caleb Duffy 0-3, Jordan Reynolds 1-0, Evan Harkin, Aaron Hoare, Riordan O'Rourke (0-1f) 0-1 each	Markievicz Park; Referee: Liam Devenney (Mayo)

==== Connacht final ====
10 July 2016; 2.00 PM; Final	Galway	3-11 - 0-10	Sligo	Pearse Stadium; Referee: Liam Devenney (Mayo)
10 July 2016; 2.00 PM; Final	Darragh Silke 0-4 (0-3f), Padraic Costello 1-1, Conor Campbell and Daniel Kenny 1-0, Matthias Barrett 0-2, Liam Boyle, Evan Murphy, Martin Kerrigan, Rory Cunningham	Report	Red Og Murphy (0-2f) and Conall Ryan 0-3 each, Niall Colsh, Barry Gorman, Luke Towey, Ryan Walsh 0-1 each	Pearse Stadium; Referee: Liam Devenney (Mayo)

=== Leinster Minor Football Championship ===
==== Leinster Format ====
Preliminary round

The eleven participating Leinster teams competed in six matches in the preliminary round of the main draw, with (Offaly) playing two matches due to the odd number of teams.

Losers section

The six beaten teams entered the losers' section and played four play-off matches. Two teams then re-entered the main draw at the quarter-final stage. From the quarter-finals all matches were played under a straight knock-out format.

==== Leinster Main Draw ====
First round
Offaly	3-18
Wexford	0-6
Offaly	0-13
Westmeath	1-4
Longford	1-19
Wicklow	3-8
Carlow	0-9
Kildare	2-13
Dublin	1-15 aet
Meath	1-13 aet
Laois	0-15 aet
Louth	2-11 aet

Quarter-finals
Rd 1 winner
Rd 1 winner
Rd 1 winner
Rd 1 winner

Semi-finals
QF winner
QF winner
QF winner
QF winner

Leinster Final

==== Leinster Losers' Section Matches ====
The six beaten teams in the preliminary round of the main draw play-off in three matches. Three teams from the losers' section re-enter the main draw at the quarter-final stage.

Losers Round 1		Leinster Quarter-finalists**		Final
Wexford	2-14
Wicklow	3-7	Quarter-finalist in Main Draw	n/a
Meath	0-10	Quarter-finalist in Main Draw	n/a
Laois	0-11
Westmeath	0-17
Carlow	2-12	Quarter-finalist in Main Draw	n/a

==== Leinster First round ====
17 April 2017; Preliminary round	Wexford	0-6 - 3-18	Offaly	Enniscorthy; Referee: Seamus Mulhare
17 April 2017; Preliminary round	Jamie Myler (0-2f) and Mick Molloy (0-2f) 0-2 each, Eoin Porter and David Gouldson 0-1 each	Report	Cian Johnston 2-5, Cian Farrell 1-3 (0-3f), Conor Lynam 0-4 (0-1f), Mark Newman 0-2, Adam Owens, Sean Ibbotson, Sean Farrell, Nathan Poland 0-1 each	Enniscorthy; Referee: Seamus Mulhare

22 April 2017; First round	Carlow	0-9 - 2-13	Kildare	Dr Cullen Park; Referee: David O'Connor
22 April 2017; First round		Report		Dr Cullen Park; Referee: David O'Connor

22 April 2017; First round	Longford	1-19 - 3-8	Wicklow	Pearse Park; Referee: James King
22 April 2017; First round		Report		Pearse Park; Referee: James King

22 April 2017; First round	Offaly	0-13 - 1-4	Westmeath	O'Connor Park; Referee: Stephen Murphy
22 April 2017; First round		Report		O'Connor Park; Referee: Stephen Murphy

22 April 2017; First round	Dublin	1-15 - 1-13 AET	Meath	Parnell Park; Referee: Patrick Maguire
22 April 2017; First round	James Doran 1-5, Ciaran Archer 0-6 (0-1f), Ross McGarry 0-2 (0-1f), Donal Ryan and Mark Tracey 0-1 each	Report	Shane Walsh 0-6 (0-3f), Conor Freyne 1-1, Jordan Morris 0-3, Adam Murphy, Sean Martin and Paddy Conway 0-1 each	Parnell Park; Referee: Patrick Maguire

22 April 2017; First round	Laois	0-15 - 2-11 AET	Louth	O'Moore Park; Referee: Niall Ward
22 April 2017; First round		Report		O'Moore Park; Referee: Niall Ward

==== Leinster Losers Section ====
6 May 2017; Losers Section	Wexford	2-14 - 3-7	Wicklow	Wexford Park; Referee: Barry Tiernan (Dublin)

6 May 2017; Losers Section	Meath	0-10 - 0-11	Laois	Páirc Tailteann; Referee: David Hickey (Carlow)

7 May 2017; Losers Section	Westmeath	0-17 - 2-12	Carlow	Cusack Park, Mullingar; Referee: Fergal Smyth (Offaly)

==== Leinster Quarter-finals ====
Quarter-final	Dublin	6-12 - 0-5	Longford	Parnell Park; Referee: Seamus Mulhaire (Laois)
Quarter-final	Ross McGarry 2-2, James Doran 1-2, Seán Hawkshaw and Adam Byrne 1-1 each, James Madden 1-0, Eoin O'Dea and Niall O'Leary 0-2 each, Darragh Conlon and David Lacey 0-1 each	Report	Dylan Farrell 0-2f, Joseph Hagan, Shane Farrell, Robbie O’Connell 0-1 each	Parnell Park; Referee: Seamus Mulhaire (Laois)

Quarter-final	Kildare	1-14 - 2-6	Laois	Newbridge; Referee: John Hickey (Carlow)
Quarter-final	Darragh Ryan 1-2, David Kelly 0-5f, Shane O'Sullivan (0-1f) and Darragh Kirwan (0-1f) 0-2 each, James Carey, Ger Cunningham, David Foley 0-1 each	Report	Ciaran Comerford 1-1, Niall Dunne 1-0, Mark Barry 0-2, Alan Kinsella, Diarmuid Whelan (0-1f), Jack Owens 0-1 each	Newbridge; Referee: John Hickey (Carlow)

Quarter-final	Louth	0-15 - 1-11	Offaly	Drogheda Park; Referee: David Hickey

Quarter-final	Carlow	2-8 - 1-12	Wexford	Dr Cullen Park; Referee: Stephen Murphy

==== Leinster Semi-finals ====
Semi-final	Wexford	2-15 - 4-10	Louth	Wexford Park

Semi-final	Kildare	0-14 - 1-16	Dublin	St Conleth's Park; Referee: John Hickey (Carlow)
Semi-final	Darragh Kirwan 0-4, Jack Barrett 0-3f, Shane O’Sullivan 0-2, Darragh Ryan, Brian McDonnell, James Burke, Findlay Nairn and Jack Cully 0-1 each	Report	Ross McGarry 1-2 (0-2f), David Lacey 0-5 (0-1f), Sean Hawkshaw 0-3, Donal Ryan and Daniel Brennan 0-2 each, James Doran and Ciaran Archer 0-1 each	St Conleth's Park; Referee: John Hickey (Carlow)

==== Leinster final ====
16 July 2017; 2.00 pm Final	Dublin	2-19 - 0-12	Louth	Croke Park, Dublin; Referee: Patrick Maguire (Longford); Man of the Match: Kieran Kennedy
16 July 2017; 2.00 pm Final	James Doran 1-1, David Lacey 0-4 (0-1f, 1 '45), James Madden 1-0, Ross McGarry 0-3, Eoin O'Dea, Sean Hawkshaw, Ciaran Archer (0-1f) 0-2 each, Kieran Kennedy, Mark Tracey, Daniel Brennan, Adam Byrne, Luke Doran 0-1 each	Report	Ciaran Keenan (0-5f) and John Gallagher (0-3f, 1 '45) 0-5 each, Liam Jackson and Ferghal Malone 0-1 each	Croke Park, Dublin; Referee: Patrick Maguire (Longford); Man of the Match: Kieran Kennedy

GK	1	David O'Hanlon (Na Fianna)
RCB	2	Darren Maher (St Patrick's, Donabate)
FB	3	Peadar Ó Cofaigh Byrne (Cuala)
LCB	4	Liam Flatman (Kilmacud Crokes)
RHB	5	Kieran Kennedy (Ballyboden St Enda's)
CHB	6	Neil Matthews (Erin's Isle)
LHB	7	Eoin O'Dea (Na Fianna)
MF	8	Mark Tracey (Cuala)
MF	9	Donal Ryan (Na Fianna) (c)
RHF	10	Daniel Brennan (St Sylvester's)
CHF	11	James Doran (Na Fianna)
LHF	12	James Madden (Ballyboden St Enda's)
RCF	13	Ross McGarry (Ballyboden St Enda's)
FF	14	Seán Hawkshaw (Naomh Mearnóg)
LCF	15	David Lacey (Na Fianna)
Substitutes:
	16	Adam Byrne (Naomh Ólaf) for Brennan
	17	Ciarán Archer (St Maur's) for Lacey
	18	Aaron Lynch (St Sylvester's) for Maher
	19	Luke Doran (Naomh Ólaf) for O'Dea
	20	Karl Lynch Bissett (Naomh Mearnóg) for Tracey
	21	Eoghan Joyce (Ballinteer St John's) for Hawkshaw

GK	1	Alan McGauley (St Mary's)
RCB	2	Alan Connor (Newtown Blues)
FB	3	Philip Trainor (St Mary's)
LCB	4	Dan Corcoran (Geraldines)
RHB	5	Leonard Grey (St Patrick's)
CHB	6	Eoghan Callaghan (Naomh Máirtín) (c)
LHB	7	James O'Reilly (Cooley Kickhams)
MF	8	Liam Jackson (St Mary's)
MF	9	Conor Morgan (Naomh Máirtín)
RHF	10	Ben Mooney (Geraldines)
CHF	11	Gerry Garland (St Mochta's)
LHF	12	Ciarán Keenan (St Mary's)
RCF	13	Fearghal Malone (Cooley Kickhams)
FF	14	John Gallagher (John Mitchels)
LCF	15	Conor Gillespie (St Mary's)
Substitutes:
	16	Adam Molloy (Na Piarsaigh) for McGauley
	17	Conor Nicholson (Dundalk Gaels) for Malone
	18	Shane Hickey (Mattock Rangers) for Morgan
	19	Nicky Browne (St Mochta's) for Mooney
	20	Shane Byrne (Roche Emmets) for Gillespie
	21	Keelan O'Neill (Glen Emmets) for Garland
	22	Dean McGreehan (Cooley Kickhams) for Grey

=== Munster Minor Football Championship ===
==== Munster Format ====
All six Munster teams competed in the three quarter-finals of the main draw. The three beaten teams entered the play-off section and, after two play-off matches, one team re-entered the main draw at the semi-final stage. From the semi-finals all matches followed a knock-out format.

==== Munster Main Draw ====
Quarter-finals
Tipperary	1-8
Cork	3-21
Kerry	2-16
Clare	1-6
Limerick	1-10
Waterford	0-9

Semi-finals
Cork	1-10
Kerry	2-17
Limerick	0-12
Clare	3-13

Munster Final
Kerry	2-21
Clare	0-3

==== Munster Playoff Rounds 1 and 2 ====
The three beaten teams in the quarter-finals of the main draw competed in a play-off in two matches. The winning team from the play-offs re-entered the main draw at the semi-final stage.

Playoff 1		Playoff 2
Clare	5-11
Waterford	0-6	Clare	0-10
		Tipperary	0-5

==== Munster Quarter-finals ====
12 April 2017; Quarter-final	Tipperary	1-8 - 3-21	Cork	Semple Stadium; Referee: Richard Moloney (Limerick)
12 April 2017; Quarter-final		Report		Semple Stadium; Referee: Richard Moloney (Limerick)

12 April 2017; Quarter-final	Kerry	2-16 - 1-6	Clare	Austin Stack Park; Referee: David Murnane (Cork)
12 April 2017; Quarter-final		Report		Austin Stack Park; Referee: David Murnane (Cork)

12 April 2017; Quarter-final	Limerick	1-10 - 0-9	Waterford	Gaelic Grounds; Referee: David Grogan (Tipperary)
12 April 2017; Quarter-final		Report		Gaelic Grounds; Referee: David Grogan (Tipperary)

==== Munster Semi-finals ====
10 May 2017; Semi-final	Cork	1-10 - 2-17	Kerry	Pairc Ui Rinn
10 May 2017; Semi-final		Report		Pairc Ui Rinn

10 May 2017; Semi-final	Limerick	0-12 - 3-13	Clare	Gaelic Grounds
10 May 2017; Semi-final		Report		Gaelic Grounds

==== Munster final ====
2 July 2017
1:00 pm
Final

Kerry	2-21 - 0-3	Clare
	Report

Fitzgerald Stadium, Killarney
Referee: David Murnane (Cork)

=== Ulster Minor Football Championship ===
==== Ulster Format ====
All nine Ulster teams competed with the fixtures mirroring the senior fixtures i.e. if Derry are drawn to play Tyrone in their first match in the senior championship then Derry minors play Tyrone minors in their first match. Often the minor teams played immediately before the seniors. All matches followed a knock-out format.

The winners receive the Fr. Murray Cup.

==== Ulster Main Draw ====
Preliminary round
Monaghan
Fermanagh

Quarter-finals
Donegal
Antrim
Derry	0-18
Tyrone	1-14
Down
Armagh
Cavan
Monaghan

Semi-finals
Derry	3-17
Antrim	0-9
Down	2-7
Cavan	0-15

Ulster Final
Derry	2-22
Cavan	1-12

==== Ulster Preliminary round ====
First round	Monaghan	1-17 - 2-7	Fermanagh	St Tiernach's Park; Referee: Stephen Campbell

==== Ulster Quarter-finals ====
21 May 2017; Quarter-final	Donegal	2-14 - 0-21	Antrim	MacCumhaill Park; Referee: Paul McKeever

28 May 2017; Quarter-final	Derry	0-18 - 1-14	Tyrone	Celtic Park
28 May 2017; Quarter-final		Report		Celtic Park

28 May 2017; Quarter-final	Cavan	3-14 - 1-15	Monaghan	Breffni Park

4 June 2017; Quarter-final	Down	2-13 - 2-11	Armagh	Páirc Esler

==== Ulster Semi-finals ====
18 June 2017; 12:00 pm Semi-final	Derry	3-17 - 0-9	Antrim	St Tiernach's Park, Clones

24 June 2017; Semi-final	Cavan	0-15 - 2-7	Down

==== Ulster final ====
16 July 2017; Noon; Final	Derry	1-22 - 2-12	Cavan	St Tiernach's Park, Clones; Referee: Martin McNally (Monaghan); Man of the Match: Padraig McGrogan
16 July 2017; Noon; Final	Ben McCarron 1-3, Lorcan McWillians 0-6 (0-3f), Paddy Quigg 0-4 (0-1f), Declan Cassidy 0-3, Conleth McShane, Padraig McGrogan, Oisin McWilliams (0-1f), Tiarnan McHugh, Fergal Mortimer, Alex Doherty 0-1 each	Report	Philip Rogers 1-2, James Smith 1-0, Cian Madden and Oisin Pierson (0-2f) 0-3 each, Patrick Lynch (0-1f) and John Cooke 0-2 each	St Tiernach's Park, Clones; Referee: Martin McNally (Monaghan); Man of the Match: Padraig McGrogan

== All-Ireland ==
=== All-Ireland Main Draw ===
Quarter-finals

Semi-finals

Final

l

=== All-Ireland Quarter-finals ===
The four provincial champions played the four beaten finalists from the provincial championships.

5 August
Quarter-final

Cavan	1-11 – 0-11	Galway
	Report

Páirc Seán Mac Diarmada, Carrick-on-Shannon

5 August
2:00 pm
Quarter-final

Derry	1-13 – 0-15	Sligo

MacCumhaill Park, Ballybofey

5 August
Quarter-final

Kerry	1-22 - 2-9	Louth
	Report

O'Moore Park, Portlaoise

7 August
Quarter-final

Dublin	2-11 – 0-10	Clare
	Report

O'Moore Park, Portlaoise

=== All-Ireland Semi-finals ===
There was no draw for the semi-finals as the fixtures are pre-determined on a three yearly rotation. This rotation ensures that a provinces's champions play the champions of all the other provinces once every three years in the semi-finals, if they each win their quarter-finals. If a provincial winner loses their quarter final, then the provincial runner-up who beat them take their place in the semi-final.

20 August; 1:30 pm Semi-final	Kerry	2-22 - 2-10	Cavan	Croke Park, Dublin; Man of the Match: David Clifford (Fossa)
20 August; 1:30 pm Semi-final		Report		Croke Park, Dublin; Man of the Match: David Clifford (Fossa)

27 August; 2:00 pm Semi-final	Dublin	0-14 - 0-17	Derry	Croke Park, Dublin; Referee: Sean Lonergan; Man of the Match: Lorcan McWilliams (Swatragh)
27 August; 2:00 pm Semi-final	James Doran 0-6, David Lacey 0-5 (0-4f), Ross McGarry 0-2, Sean Hawshaw 0-1	Report	Paddy Quigg (0-4f) and Lorcan McWilliams (0-4f) 0-5 each, Ben McCarron 0-3 (0-2f), Oisin McWilliams, Richie Mullan, Mark McGrogan, Jon Paul Devlin 0-1 each	Croke Park, Dublin; Referee: Sean Lonergan; Man of the Match: Lorcan McWilliams (Swatragh)

=== All-Ireland final ===
17 September
1:15 pm
Final

Kerry	6-17 – 1-8	Derry
David Clifford 4-4, Fiachra Clifford 2-0, Brian Friel 0-5 (0-1f), Dónal O’Sullivan 0-3, Jack Griffin 0-2, Adam Donoghue, Donnchadh O’Sullivan, Eddie Horan 0-1 each.	Report	Patrick Quigg 1-1 (1-0 pen), Lorcan McWilliams (0-1f), Mark McGrogan, Oisin McWilliams 0-2 each, Richie Mullan 0-1.

Croke Park, Dublin
Referee: Anthony Nolan (Wicklow)

== Miscellaneous ==
- Kerry win a fourth consecutive All-Ireland minor title. This is the first time this has been achieved since the beginning of the Minor Championship.
- Kerry set a new record of 24 consecutive wins since their last defeat in the 2013 All-Ireland Quarter-final defeat to Tyrone.

== See also ==
- 2017 All-Ireland Senior Football Championship
- 2017 All-Ireland Under-21 Football Championship
