= 2016 Hogan Cup =

- Dates: 16 March – 2 April 2016
- Teams: 4
- Sponsor: Masita
- Champions: St Brendan's College (3rd title); Dan O'Brien (captain); Garry McGrath (manager)
- Runners-up: St Patrick's College; Conor Glass (captain); Paul Hughes (manager)

Tournament statistics
- Matches played: 3
- Goals scored: 13 (4.33 per match)
- Points scored: 67 (22.33 per match)
- Top scorer(s): Shane McGuigan (2-11)

The 2016 Hogan Cup was the 63rd staging of the Hogan Cup since its establishment by the Gaelic Athletic Association in 1946. The competition ran from 16 March to 2 April 2016.

Pobalscoil Chorca Dhuibhne were the defending champions, however, they were beaten by St Brendan's College in the Corn Uí Mhuirí.

The final was played on 2 April 2016 at Croke Park in Dublin, between St Brendan's College and St Patrick's College, in what was their first ever meeting in the final. St Brendan's College won the match by 2–13 to 2–06 to claim their third Hogan Cup title overall and a first title in 24 years.

Shane McGuigan was the top scorer with 2–11.

== Qualification ==
Province	Champions
Connacht	Summerhill College
Leinster	St Benildus College
Munster	St Brendan's College
Ulster	St Patrick's College

== Results ==
=== Semi-finals ===
16 March 2016 Semi-final	St Brendan's College	4-15 - 0-09	St Benildus College	MacDonagh Park
	E Cronin 2-3, D Shaw 1-1, D Clifford 0-4 (1f), M Casey 1-0, D Moynihan 0-3, P McCarthy 0-2, A O’Shea & C O’Shea 0-1 each.	Report	S O’Brien 0-3, T Fox 0-2, C Pearson, D O’Brien, J Rafferty & A Fox 0-1 each.	Referee: D O'Mahony (Tipperary)

23 March 2016 Semi-final	St Patrick's College	2-14 - 3-10	Summerhill College	Brewster Park
	S McGuigan (1-8, 3f); F Kearney (1-1, 1-0 pen); O McWilliams (0-2); P McCormack, F Higgins, O McKeever (0-1 each),	Report	K Cawley (2-2, 1-0 pen, 1 “45”); N Rooney (0-4, 3f); C Herron (1-2); P O’Connor, S Mulligan (0-1);	Referee: N McKenna (Monaghan)

=== Final ===
2 April 2016 Final	St Brendan's College	2-13 - 2-06	St Patrick's College	Croke Park
	D Clifford (2-5, 0-2 frees); D Moynihan (0-4); E Cronin, B Courtney (0-1 ’45), D Shaw, M Casey (0-1 each).	Report	S McGuigan (1-3, 0-2 frees); P Kearney (1-0); S Downey, J Doherty, O McWilliams (0-1 each).	Referee: D Gough (Meath)

== Statistics ==
=== Top scorers ===
Rank	Player	Club	Tally	Total	Matches	Average
1	Shane McGuigan	St Patrick's College	2-11	17	2	8.50
2	David Clifford	St Brendan's College	2-09	15	2	7.50
3	Evan Cronin	St Brendan's College	2-04	10	2	5.00
4	Kyle Cawley	Summerhill College	2-02	8	1	8.00
5	Dara Moynihan	St Brendan's College	0-07	7	2	3.50
