= 2019 Kerry Senior Football Championship =

Gaelic football competition

2019 Kerry SFC
Tournament details
- County: Kerry
- Year: 2019
- Trophy: Bishop Moynihan Cup
- Sponsor: Garvey's Supervalu
- Teams: 17
- Defending champions: Dr. Crokes

Winners
- Champions: East Kerry
- Manager: Jerry O'Sullivan
- Captain: Dan O'Donoghue

Promotion/Relegation
- Promoted team(s): Templenoe
- Relegated team(s): Rathmore

Other
- Top Scorer: Tony Brosnan
- Website: Kerry GAA

The 2019 Kerry Senior Football Championship was the 118th edition of Kerry GAA's premier gaelic football tournament for senior teams in County Kerry, Ireland. The tournament consists of 17 teams (8 club teams and 9 divisional teams), with the winners representing Kerry in the Munster Senior Club Football Championship if they are a club team. If the winners are a divisional team the winners of the Kerry Club Football Championship represent the county.

The championship has a back-door format for the first two rounds before proceeding to a knock-out format. Generally, any team to lose two matches will be knocked out of the championship.

This was Kilcummin's return to the senior ranks after only a one year absence, meaning they will no longer provide players to the East Kerry District panel for this season. An Ghaeltacht (who were relegated to the I.F.C. for 2019) will provide the West Kerry Divisional side with players for the S.F.C.

Dr. Crokes were the 2018 champions after they defeated Dingle in the final.

== Format Structure Change ==
8 club teams and 9 divisional teams (17 in total) will take part in this year's S.F.C. It was decided that only 8 divisional sides would take part in the competition proper so the 2 lowest ranked divisional sides from the previous 5 years would play off in a qualification match with the winner entering the draw for the 2019 County Championship proper.

Relegation (See below): The club team to be relegated from the Senior County Championship will be the same team to be relegated from the Senior Club Championship (The 8 senior clubs play off against each other in two pools in the Club Championship. The two teams that finished bottom of the Group Pools enter a relegation final. This loser will be relegated to the I.F.C. for 2020. Should a club reach the final of the County championship they will be exempt from the Relegation process in the Club championship).

The winner of the 2019 I.F.C. will be promoted to the 2020 Senior County and Club Championships.

== Team changes ==
The following teams have changed division since the 2018 championship season.

=== To S.F.C. ===
Promoted from 2018 I.F.C.

- Kilcummin - (Intermediate Champions)

=== From S.F.C. ===
Relegated to 2019 I.F.C.

- An Ghaeltacht

== Participating teams ==
The teams taking part in the 2019 Kerry Senior Football Championship are:

Team	Team Location	Club/Divisional	Club's Divisional Side
Austin Stacks	Tralee	Club	St. Brendan's
Dingle	Dingle	Club	West Kerry
Dr. Crokes	Killarney	Club	East Kerry
East Kerry	x	Divisional (Firies, Fossa, Glenflesk, Gneevguilla, Listry, Spa)	x
Feale Rangers	x	Divisional (Clounmacon, Duagh, Finuge, Listowel Emmets, Moyvane, St. Senan's)	x
Kenmare District	x	Divisional (Templenoe, Tousist, Kilgarvan)	x
Kenmare Shamrocks	Kenmare	Club	Kenmare District
Kerins O'Rahillys	Tralee	Club	St. Brendan's
Kilcummin	Kilcummin	Club	East Kerry
Killarney Legion	Killarney	Club	East Kerry
Mid Kerry	x	Divisional (Beaufort, Cromane, Glenbeigh-Glencar, Keel, Laune Rangers, Milltown/Castlemaine)	x
Rathmore	Rathmore	Club	East Kerry
Shannon Rangers	x	Divisional (Asdee, Ballydonoghue, Ballyduff, Ballylongford, Beale, Tarbert)	x
South Kerry	x	Divisional (Derrynane, Dromid Pearses, Renard, Skellig Rangers, Sneem, St. Mary's, St. Michael's/Foilmore, Valentia Young Islanders, Waterville)	x
St. Brendan's	x	Divisional (Ardfert, Churchill, John Mitchell's, Na Gaeil, St. Patrick's Blennerville)	x
St. Kieran's	x	Divisional (Ballymacelligott, Brosna, Castleisland Desmonds, Cordal, Currow, Knocknagoshel, Scartaglin)	x
West Kerry	x	Divisional (An Ghaeltacht, Annascaul, Castlegregory, Lispole)	x

== Championship Qualifier ==
It was decided that only 8 of the 9 Divisional Teams would play in the Senior Championship proper. To determine which team would be excluded, all divisional teams placed into an open draw. Two of these divisional sides were drawn to play in a Qualifying Round. The winner would proceed to Round 1 of the championship proper while the loser would exit the championship until the following year. The ranking system of previous years was abolished.

29 August 2019; Qualifying round	St. Kieran's	2-11 - 0-8	Feale Rangers	Austin Stack Park; Referee: Paul Hayes

== Rounds 1 to 3 ==
=== Round 1 ===
The sixteen remaining teams play in eight matches in Round 1. The winners proceed to Round 2A while the losers play in Round 2B.

21 September 2019; Round 1	St. Kieran's	0-12 - 0-9	Mid Kerry	Brosna; Referee: Denis Sayers

21 September 2019; Round 1	Dingle	0-12 - 0-6	Austin Stacks	Dingle; Referee: Padraig O Sullivan

22 September 2019; Round 1	Killarney Legion	1-16 - 1-12	Kilcummin	Fitzgerald Stadium; Referee: Sean Joy

22 September 2019; Round 1	St. Brendan's	2-11 - 1-12	East Kerry	Austin Stack Park; Referee: S Mulvihill (St. Senan's)
22 September 2019; Round 1	I Parker (1-1), D O’Connor (1-2), N Sheehy (0-3, 3f), E O’Brien (0-2); D Griffin (0-1), J Duggan (0-1), A O’Donoghue (0-1).	Report	D Roche (1-4), D Moynihan (0-3), B O’Donoghue (0-2), E Cronin (0-2), L Kearney (0-1).	Austin Stack Park; Referee: S Mulvihill (St. Senan's)

22 September 2019; Round 1	South Kerry	3-16 - 1-10	Shannon Rangers	Caherciveen; Referee: Brendan Brosnan

22 September 2019; Round 1	West Kerry	2-18 - 2-17	Kenmare District	Templenoe; Referee: Donal Casey

22 September 2019; Round 1	Kerins O'Rahilly's	2-15 - 1-17	Kenmare Shamrocks	Austin Stack Park; Referee: Jonathan Griffin

22 September 2019; Round 1	Dr. Croke's	3-26 - 2-12	Rathmore	Fitzgerald Stadium; Referee: Brendan Griffin

=== Round 2 ===
==== Round 2A ====
The eight winners from Round 1 play each other in this round. The winners proceed to the knock-out quarter finals while the losers play in Round 3.

28 September 2019; Round 2A	South Kerry	1-12 - 1-9	St. Brendan's	Austin Stack Park; Referee: James O'Sullivan

28 September 2019; Round 2A	Dr. Croke's	0-17 - 0-8	St. Kieran's	Austin Stack Park; Referee: Peter Lyons

28 September 2019; Round 2A	Dingle	2-9 - 1-11	Kerins O'Rahilly's	Dingle; Referee: Edmund Walsh

29 September 2019; Round 2A	Killarney Legion	2-15 - 2-9	West Kerry	Annascaul; Referee: Jermiah Lynch

==== Round 2B ====
The eight losers from Round 1 play each other in this round. The winners proceed to Round 3 while the losers are eliminated from the championship having lost two games.

29 September 2019; Round 2B	Kenmare Shamrocks	1-13 - 2-9 AET	Rathmore	Fitzgerald Stadium; Referee: Paul Hayes

29 September 2019; Round 2B	Kilcummin	2-12 - 0-13	Mid Kerry	Killorglin; Referee: Eamonn Moran

29 September 2019; Round 2B	Shannon Rangers	0-14 - 1-10	Kenmare District	Templenoe; Referee: Tom Moriarty

29 September 2019; Round 2B	East Kerry	3-13 - 3-7	Austin Stacks	Fitzgerald Stadium; Referee: B O'Shea (Keel)
29 September 2019; Round 2B	P Clifford (2-1, 1 pen, 1 '45), S Cronin (1-1), D Clifford (0-3, 2f), D Roche (0-3, 2f), B O'Donoghue (0-2), R Buckley (0-2), L Kearney (0-1).	Report	M O'Gara (2-0), M O'Donnell (1-0), S Quilter (0-3, 2f), D O'Brien (0-3, 2f), S O'Callaghan (0-1).	Fitzgerald Stadium; Referee: B O'Shea (Keel)

=== Round 3 ===
The four Round 2A losers (who won a game and lost a game) play the four Round 2B winners (who lost a game and won a game) in this round. The four winners progress to the knock-out quarter finals while the losers are eliminated from the championship.

5 October 2019; Round 3	St. Brendan's	4-22 - 1-12	Shannon Rangers	Austin Stack Park; Referee: Edmund Walsh

5 October 2019; Round 3	East Kerry	0-20 - 3-9	Kerins O'Rahilly#s	Austin Stack Park; Referee: B Griffin (Clounmacon)
5 October 2019; Round 3	D Clifford 0-8 (3f), M Foley 0-4, D Roche 0-3 (2f), P Clifford 1 ('45'), S Cronin 0-1, L Kearney 0-1, R Buckley 0-1, B O'Donoghue 0-1.	Report	J Savage 1-4 (0-3f), T Walsh 1-2, K Mullins 1-1, R Carroll 0-1f, D Moran 0-1.	Austin Stack Park; Referee: B Griffin (Clounmacon)

6 October 2019; Round 3	Kenmare Shamrocks	2-11 - 2-8	West Kerry	Fitzgerald Stadium; Referee: Denis Sayers

13 October 2019; Round 3	St. Kieran's	0-21 - 1-13	Kilcummin	Fitzgerald Stadium; Referee: Jonathan Griffin

== Knock-Out Stage ==
=== Quarter-finals ===
The four Round 2A winners play the four Round 3 winners in the quarter-finals.

19 October 2019; Quarter-Final	Killarney Legion	1-10 - 1-12	St. Brendan's	Austin Stack Park; Referee: Sean Joy; Man of the Match: Diarmuid O'Connor

19 October 2019; Quarter-Final	Dingle	1-12 - 1-23	East Kerry	Austin Stack Park; Referee: S Mulvihill; Man of the Match: Paudie Clifford
19 October 2019; Quarter-Final	P Devane 1-1, B O’Sullivan 0-2, M Geaney 0-2, P Geaney 0-2, C Geaney 0-2 (1f), T O’Sullivan 0-1, G Durrant 0-1.	Report	D Roche 0-9 (4f), D Clifford 1-6, R Buckley 0-2, P Clifford 0-2, J Sherwood 0-1, L Kearney 0-1, E Cronin 0-1, D Spillane 0-1.	Austin Stack Park; Referee: S Mulvihill; Man of the Match: Paudie Clifford

20 October 2019; Quarter-Final	South Kerry	0-17 - 1-10	St. Kieran's	Fitzgerald Stadium; Referee: Paul Hayes

20 October 2019; Quarter-Final	Dr. Crokes	1-20 - 1-12	Kenmare Shamrocks	Fitzgerald Stadium; Referee: Padraig O'Sullivan

=== Semi-finals ===
27 October 2019; 13:30; Semi-Final	East Kerry	1-18 - 1-14	St. Brendan's Board	Fitzgerald Stadium; Attendance: 4,755; Referee: J Griffin (Glenbeigh-Glencar)
27 October 2019; 13:30; Semi-Final	D Clifford (0-9, 2 frees); D Roche (1-3, 0-3 frees); R Buckley (0-2); M Foley, L Kearney, J Sherwood, P Clifford (free) (0-1 each).	Report	N Sheehy (1-3, 1-0 pen, 0-2 frees); I Parker, D Griffin, J Barry (0-2 each); D O’Callaghan, B O’Donoghue, E O’Brien (free), T Kerins, B Poff (0-1 each).	Fitzgerald Stadium; Attendance: 4,755; Referee: J Griffin (Glenbeigh-Glencar)

27 October 2019; 15:15; Semi-Final	Dr Crokes	1-15 - 0-18 (aet)	South Kerry	Fitzgerald Stadium; Attendance: 4,755; Referee: Paul Hayes

3 November 2019; 14:00; Semi-Final Replay	Dr Crokes	1-14 - 1-08	South Kerry	Fitzgerald Stadium; Referee: Seamus Mulvihil

== Final ==
10 November 2019; 3:00pm Final	East Kerry	2-14 - 1-07	Dr. Crokes	Austin Stack Park; Attendance: 8,267; Referee: B Griffin (Clounmacon); Man of the Match: Paudie Clifford
10 November 2019; 3:00pm Final	D Clifford 1-3 (0-1f), D Roche 1-2 (0-1f), E Cronin 0-4, M Foley 0-3, P Clifford 0-1, P Doyle 0-1.	Report	G White 1-1, T Brosnan 0-4 (1f), M O’Shea 0-1, K O’Leary 0-1.	Austin Stack Park; Attendance: 8,267; Referee: B Griffin (Clounmacon); Man of the Match: Paudie Clifford

== Relegation ==
The club team to be relegated from the Senior County Championship will be the same team to be relegated from the Senior Club Championship. The 8 senior clubs are placed into two groups containing four teams during the Club Championship. The teams to finish bottom of both groups will face off in the Relegation Final, with the loser being relegated to the I.F.C. for 2020. Should a club reach the final of the County championship they will be exempt from the Relegation process in the Club championship.

26 October 2019
16:00
Relegation Final

Kilcummin	1-15 - 0-12	Rathmore
	Report

Dr Crokes GAA

== Championship statistics ==
=== Miscellaneous ===
- East Kerry win the title for the first time since 1999.
- East Kerry qualify for the final for the first time since 1999.
- Dr Crokes lose their first final since 2009, having won in their last seven appearances.
- Rathmor lose their 20-year senior club championship status.
