= 2020 Kerry Senior Football Championship =

Gaelic football competition

2019 Kerry SFC
Tournament details
- County: Kerry
- Year: 2020
- Trophy: Bishop Moynihan Cup
- Sponsor: Garvey's Supervalu
- Teams: 17
- Defending champions: East Kerry

Winners
- Champions: East Kerry
- Manager: Jerry O'Sullivan
- Captain: Dan O'Donoghue

Promotion/Relegation
- Promoted team(s): Templenoe
- Relegated team(s): Kilcummin

Other
- Top Scorer: Gavan O'Grady
- Website: Kerry GAA

The 2020 Kerry Senior Football Championship was the 119th edition of Kerry GAA's premier Gaelic football tournament for senior teams in County Kerry, Ireland. The tournament consists of 16 teams (8 club teams and 8 divisional teams), with the winners representing Kerry in the Munster Senior Club Football Championship if they are a club team. If the winners are a divisional team the winners of the Kerry Club Football Championship represent the county.

The championship usually has a back-door format for the first two rounds before proceeding to a knock-out format. Generally, any team to lose two matches will be knocked out of the championship. This year however, due to the COVID-19 pandemic seen the competition employ a straight knockout format.

It was Templenoe's first ever year as a senior club. Rathmore (who were relegated to the I.F.C. for 2020) will provide the East Kerry Divisional side with players for the S.F.C. Additionally, the Kenmare District board ceased to run competitions this year meaning that Kenmare Shamrocks, Kilgarvan, and Tousist will move to East Kerry to make it a 16-club division. The fourth club in the Kenmare District, Templenoe, who have been promoted to senior for 2020, joined the South Kerry Division.

East Kerry were the 2019 champions after they defeated Dr. Crokes in the final.

== Format Structure Change ==
8 club teams and 8 divisional teams (16 in total) will take part in this year's S.F.C.

Kenmare District did not field a team for this year's S.F.C.

Relegation (See below): The club team to be relegated from the Senior County Championship will be the same team to be relegated from the Senior Club Championship (The 8 senior clubs play off against each other in two pools in the Club Championship. The two teams that finished bottom of the Group Pools enter a Relegation Final. This loser will be relegated to the I.F.C. for 2021. Should a club reach the final of the County championship they will be exempt from the Relegation process in the Club championship).

The winner of the 2020 I.F.C. will be promoted to the 2021 Senior County and Club Championships.

== Team changes ==
The following teams have changed division since the 2019 championship season.

=== To S.F.C. ===
Promoted from 2019 I.F.C.

- Templenoe - (Intermediate Champions)

=== From S.F.C. ===
Relegated to 2020 I.F.C.

- Kenmare District - (defunct)
- Rathmore

== Participating teams ==
The teams taking part in the 2020 Kerry Senior Football Championship are:

Team	Team Location	Club/Divisional	Club's Divisional Side
Austin Stacks	Tralee	Club	St. Brendan's
Dingle	Dingle	Club	West Kerry
Dr. Crokes	Killarney	Club	East Kerry
East Kerry	x	Divisional (Firies, Fossa, Glenflesk, Gneevguilla, Kilgarvan, Listry, Rathmore, Spa, Tousist)	x
Feale Rangers	x	Divisional (Clounmacon, Duagh, Finuge, Listowel Emmets, Moyvane, St. Senan's)	x
Kenmare Shamrocks	Kenmare	Club	East Kerry
Kerins O'Rahillys	Tralee	Club	St. Brendan's
Kilcummin	Kilcummin	Club	East Kerry
Killarney Legion	Killarney	Club	East Kerry
Mid Kerry	x	Divisional (Beaufort, Cromane, Glenbeigh-Glencar, Keel, Laune Rangers, Milltown/Castlemaine)	x
Rathmore	Rathmore	Club	East Kerry
Shannon Rangers	x	Divisional (Asdee, Ballydonoghue, Ballyduff, Ballylongford, Beale, Tarbert)	x
South Kerry	x	Divisional (Derrynane, Dromid Pearses, Renard, Skellig Rangers, Sneem, St. Mary's, St. Michael's/Foilmore, Valentia Young Islanders, Waterville)	x
St Brendan's	x	Divisional (Ardfert, Churchill, John Mitchell's, Na Gaeil, St. Patrick's Blennerville)	x
St Kieran's	x	Divisional (Ballymacelligott, Brosna, Castleisland Desmonds, Cordal, Currow, Knocknagoshel, Scartaglin)	x
Templenoe	Templenoe	Club	South Kerry
West Kerry	x	Divisional (An Ghaeltacht, Annascaul, Castlegregory, Lispole)	x

== Results ==
=== Round 1 ===
All 16 teams enter the competition in Round 1. The eight winners proceed to the Quarter-Finals while the eight losers are eliminated.

22 August 2020; Round 1	East Kerry	1-14 - 0-03	Feale Rangers	Frank Sheehy Park; Referee: B O'Shea
22 August 2020; Round 1	D Roche (1-3, 0-2 frees); D Clifford (0-6, 0-4 frees, 0-1 mark); P Clifford (0-3, 0-1 free, 0-1 45’);D Moynihan, M Foley (0-1 each).	Report	S Keane (0-2, 0-2 frees); D Lynch (0-1 free).	Frank Sheehy Park; Referee: B O'Shea

22 August 2020; Round 1	Dingle	1-12 - 3-07	Templenoe	Páirc an Aghasaigh; Referee: B Brosnan (Glenflesk)
22 August 2020; Round 1	C Geaney (0-5, 2 frees), M O Flaherty (1-0), T O’Sullivan (0-3), D Geaney (0-2 each), D O’Connor, G Durant (0-1 each).	Report	K Spillane (1-5, 2 frees), J Crowley Holland (1-0), T Doyle (1- 0), B Crowley, S O’Sullivan (0-1 each).	Páirc an Aghasaigh; Referee: B Brosnan (Glenflesk)

22 August 2020; Round 1	Austin Stacks	2-17 - 3-19	Dr. Crokes	Austin Stack Park; Referee: J Griffin
22 August 2020; Round 1	S Quilter (0-5, 0-2 frees, 0-1 mark); D O’Brien (0-4, 0-3 frees); J O’Connor (1-1); K Donaghy (1-0); C Griffin, J Morgan, D Casey, W Guthrie (0-1 free), F O’Brien (0-1 free), S O’Callaghan, J O’Shea (0-1 each).	Report	T Brosnan (2-10, 2-0 pen, 0-6 frees); B Looney (1-1); M Burns (0-3, 0-1 free); C Doncel, G O’Shea, K O’Leary, C O’Regan, A O’Sullivan (0-1 each).	Austin Stack Park; Referee: J Griffin

22 August 2020; Round 1	Kenmare Shamrocks	0-13 - 0-09	Shannon Rangers	Fr. Breen Park; Referee: T Moriarty (Killarney Legion)
22 August 2020; Round 1	Paul O’Connor (0-5, 3f), S O’Brien and S O’Shea (2f) (0-3 each), K O’Sullivan and T Murnane (0-1 each)	Report	J Kennelly (0-5, 3f, 1m, 1p), J O’Sullivan, M Buckley, P Kennelly; D Keane (0-1 each)	Fr. Breen Park; Referee: T Moriarty (Killarney Legion)

23 August 2020; Round 1	Killarney Legion	1-11 - 0-13	Kerins O'Rahilly's	Fitzgerald Stadium; Referee: B Griffin
23 August 2020; Round 1	J O’Donoghue (0-3); D Lyne (1-0); C Keane (0-1 free), R Leen, J O’Sullivan (0-2 each); B Kelly (0-1 ‘45), P McCarthy (0-1 each).	Report	J Savage (0-7, 0-2 frees); C Hayes (0-3); G O’Brien, S Walsh, P Begley (0-1).	Fitzgerald Stadium; Referee: B Griffin

23 August 2020; Round 1	Mid Kerry	3-15 - 0-12	Kilcummin	Fitzgerald Stadium; Referee: S Mulvihill (St Senans)
23 August 2020; Round 1	G O’Grady (1-7, 4 frees), L Carey (1free) and F Clifford (1-2 each), C Kennedy, M Breen, D Roche and D O’Sullivan (0-1 each).	Report	N Duggan (0-4 frees), P O’Shea (0-4), K McCarthy (0-2), M Keane and K Gorman (0-1 each).	Fitzgerald Stadium; Referee: S Mulvihill (St Senans)

23 August 2020; Round 1	St Brendan's	1-15 - 0-14	West Kerry	Austin Stack Park
23 August 2020; Round 1	I Parker (0-9, 0-2 frees); M Kelliher (1-0); E O’Brien (0-2, 0-2 frees); D Griffin, C Fitzgerald, T Kearns, J Lenihan (0-1 each).	Report	R Ó Beaglaoich (0-5, 0-2 frees, 0-1 m); E Ó Conchúir (0-4, 0-3 frees); T Ó Sé (0-1 m), K Falvey (0-2 each); B Ó Beaglaoich (0-1).	Austin Stack Park

23 August 2020; Round 1	South Kerry	3-11 - 0-22	St. Kieran's	Austin Stack Park; Referee: P O'Sullivan (Firies)
23 August 2020; Round 1	J Daly and N O’Shea (1-0 pen) (1-1 each), D Donoghue and D Daly (0-4 each), M O’Sullivan (1-0), G O’Sullivan (0-1).	Report	P Walsh (0-7, 1 free, 1 mark), E Horan (0-6, 2 frees), T Hickey (0-4), T Lynch, A Breen, P O’Connor, S Horan and L Brosnan (0-1 each).	Austin Stack Park; Referee: P O'Sullivan (Firies)

=== Quarter-finals ===
29 August 2020; Quarter-Final	Killarney Legion	1-09 - 2-17	St Brendan's	Austin Stack Park; Referee: B O'Shea (Keel)
29 August 2020; Quarter-Final	J O’Donoghue (0-5, 4 frees), J O’Sullivan (1-1), C Keane (0-2 frees), J Lyne (0-1)	Report	D O’Connor ( 1-3), I Parker ( 0-6, 3 frees), J Barry (1-0), A O’Donoghue and M Kelliher ( 0-2 each ), K O’Dwyer, C Fitzgerald, I McCarthy and J Myers ( 0-1 each).	Austin Stack Park; Referee: B O'Shea (Keel)

29 August 2020; Quarter-Final	East Kerry	2-13 - 1-14	St. Kieran's	Austin Stack Park; Referee: J Griffin (Glenbeigh-Glencar)
29 August 2020; Quarter-Final	D Clifford (1-5, 4 frees), P Clifford (1-1), D Roche (0-4, 2 frees), E Cronin (0-2), J Sherwood (0-1).	Report	E Horan (0-8, 5 frees), J Walsh (1-1), P Walsh (0-2, 1 free), S Og O Ciardubhain (’45), P O’Connor and M Hickey (0-1 each).	Austin Stack Park; Referee: J Griffin (Glenbeigh-Glencar)

30 August 2020; Quarter-Final	Dr. Crokes	1-16 - 0-11	Templenoe	Fitzgerald Stadium; Referee: S Mulvihill
30 August 2020; Quarter-Final	T Brosnan (0-8, 0-2 marks, 2 frees); M Burns (0-4, 1 '45); G White (1-0); K O’Leary (0-2); C Doncel, B Looney (0-1 each).	Report	K Spillane (0-6, 0-2 frees); A Spillane (0-2); S O’Sullivan (0-1 mark), T Doyle, B Crowley (0-1 each).	Fitzgerald Stadium; Referee: S Mulvihill

30 August 2020; Quarter-Final	Mid Kerry	1-13 - 1-12	Kenmare Shamrocks	Fitzgerald Stadium; Referee: P Hayes
30 August 2020; Quarter-Final	G O’Grady (1-3, 1-0 pen, 0-1 ‘45); L Carey (0-3, 0-1 free); C Kennedy (0-2); P Crowley, J O’Connor, D O’Sullivan (0-1 free), P Kilkenny, F Clifford (0-1 each).	Report	P O’Connor (1-7, 0-3 frees); K O’Sullivan (0-2); S O’Brien, R O’Sullivan, M Crowley (0-1 each).	Fitzgerald Stadium; Referee: P Hayes

=== Semi-finals ===
11 September 2020; Semi-Final	East Kerry	1-11 - 0-08	St Brendan's	Austin Stack Park; Referee: B Griffin
11 September 2020; Semi-Final	E Cronin (1-2); D Roche (0-5, 0-4 frees); D Moynihan (0-2); P Clifford, M Foley (0-1 each).	Report	D O’Connor (0-2); E O’Brien (0-1 free), T Kerins, I Parker (0-1 free), M Kelliher, J Conway, A Barry (0-1 each).	Austin Stack Park; Referee: B Griffin

13 September 2020; Semi-Final	Mid Kerry	3-20 - 3-19 (aet)	Dr. Crokes	Austin Stack Park; Referee: P Hayes (Kerins O'Rahilly's)
13 September 2020; Semi-Final	G O’Grady (1-8, 3 frees), L Carey (0-4, 1 free), R Murphy (1-1), C Kennedy (1-0), D Mangan, P Kilkenny, D Roche, F Clifford, C Moriarty, C Teahan, J O’Connor (0-1 each).	Report	M Burns (1-5), K O’Leary (0-5, 1 free), C Doncel (1-1), G White (1-1), B Looney, D Shaw (0-2 each), F Fitzgerald, J Buckley, M O’Shea (0-1 each).	Austin Stack Park; Referee: P Hayes (Kerins O'Rahilly's)

== Final ==
26 September 2020; Final	East Kerry	2-15 - 0-09	Mid Kerry	Austin Stack Park; Referee: P Hayes
26 September 2020; Final	D Clifford (1-4); D Roche (1-3, 0-1 mark, 0-1 free); E Cronin (0-3, 0-1 mark); R Buckley, D Moynihan (0-2 each); B O’Donoghue (0-1 each).	Report	L Carey (0-6, 0-4 frees); D Roche, C Kennedy (0-1 free), G O’Grady (0-1) each.	Austin Stack Park; Referee: P Hayes

== Relegation play-off ==
The club team to be relegated from the Senior County Championship will be the same team to be relegated from the Senior Club Championship. The 8 senior clubs are placed into two groups containing four teams during the Club Championship. The teams to finish bottom of both groups will face off in the Relegation Final, with the loser being relegated to the I.F.C. for 2020. Should a club reach the final of the County championship they will be exempt from the Relegation process in the Club championship.

13 September 2020
Relegation play-off

Templenoe	3-18 - 0-14	Kilcummin
K Spillane (1-7, 3f), S O’Sullivan (1-5), B Crowley (0-4), J Crowley-Holland (1-0), M Reilly and C Crowley (0-1 each).	Report	N Duggan (0-6, 6f), P O’Shea (0-5), S McSweeney, K Gorman and K McCarthy (0-1 each)

Fitzgerald Stadium
Referee: P O’Sullivan (Firies)

== Championship statistics ==
=== Top scorers ===
Overall

Rank	Player	Club	Tally	Total	Matches	Average
1	Gavan O'Grady	Mid Kerry	3-19	28	4	7.00
2	Tony Brosnan	Dr. Crokes	2-18	24	2	12.00
2	Killian Spillane	Templenoe	2-18	24	3	8.00
4	David Clifford	East Kerry	2-15	21	3	7.00
4	Darragh Roche	East Kerry	2-15	21	4	5.25
6	Liam Carey	Mid Kerry	1-15	18	4	4.50
7	Ivan Parker	St. Brendan's Board	0-16	16	3	5.33
8	Paul O'Connor	Kenmare Shamrocks	1-12	15	2	7.50
8	Micheál Burns	Dr. Crokes	1-12	15	3	5.00
10	Eddie Horan	St. Brendan's Board	0-14	14	2	7.00

In a single game

Rank	Player	Club	Tally	Total	Opposition
1	Tony Brosnan	Dr. Crokes	2-10	16	Austin Stacks
2	Gavan O'Grady	Mid Kerry	1-08	11	Dr. Crokes
3	Gavan O'Grady	Mid Kerry	1-07	10	Kilcummin
3	Paul O'Connor	Kenmare Shamrocks	1-07	10	Mid Kerry
5	Ivan Parker	St. Brendan's Board	0-09	9	West Kerry
6	Killian Spillane	Templenoe	1-05	8	Kilcummin
6	Micheál Burns	Dr. Crokes	1-05	8	Mid Kerry
6	David Clifford	East Kerry	1-05	8	St. Kieran's
6	Eddie Horan	St. Kieran's	0-08	8	East Kerry
6	Tony Brosnan	Dr. Crokes	0-08	8	Templenoe

=== Miscellaneous ===
- Templenoe make their first appearance at senior level.
- Kenmare District fail to field a team.
