= Micheál Burns =

Irish Gaelic footballer

Personal information
- Born: Killarney, County Kerry, Ireland
- Height: 5 ft 9 in (175 cm)

Sport
- Sport: Gaelic football
- Position: Right wing-forward
Club
- Years: Club
- Dr Crokes
Club titles
- Kerry titles: 4
- Munster titles: 2
- All-Ireland Titles: 1
Inter-county
- Years: County
- 2018–: Kerry
Inter-county titles
- Munster titles: 7
- All-Irelands: 2
- NFL: 4
- All Stars: 0

Micheál Burns (born 1996) is an Irish Gaelic footballer. At club level he plays with Dr Crokes, and at inter-county level with the Kerry senior football team.

== Career ==
Burns first played Gaelic football to a high standard as a schoolboy at St Brendan's College in Killarney. He began his club career at juvenile and underage levels with Dr Crokes and won a Kerry MFC medal in 2014. Burns later progressed to adult level and won three successive Kerry SFC medals from 2016 to 2018. Two of these wins were converted into Munster Club SFC titles before claiming an All-Ireland Club SFC medal after a defeat of Slaughtneil in the 2017 final.

Burns first appeared on the inter-county scene with Kerry as a member of the minor team that beat Donegal in the 2014 All-Ireland minor final. A three-year association with the under-21 team yielded a Munster U21FC medal in 2017.

After his under-21 tenure came to an end, Burns was drafted onto the senior team in 2018. He won the first of six Munster SFC medals that year. Burns won an All-Ireland SFC medal after coming on as a substitute for Stephen O'Brien following a defeat of Galway in the 2022 final.

Burns "stepped away" from the Kerry county panel in early 2024, citing a lack of "game time". Shortly after his exit from the Kerry panel, he travelled to Australia and joined up with Wolfe Tones, a Melbourne GAA club.

In early 2025, Burns was recalled to the Kerry senior football team. Burns would start in the 2025 Munster final scoring a goal in the win over Clare. Burns would win a second All-Ireland SFC medal, appearing as a substitute in the final win over Donegal.

Burns was shown a red card in Killarney in the 2026 championship after his "dirty punch" left Ryan McHugh with a split eye and blood pouring from his face as the teams prepared to leave the field at half-time. McHugh emerged with his head heavily bandaged and had to be substituted.

== Honours ==
Dr Crokes

- All-Ireland Senior Club Football Championship: 2017
- Munster Senior Club Football Championship: 2016, 2018
- Kerry Senior Football Championship: 2016, 2017, 2018, 2024

Kerry

- All-Ireland Senior Football Championship: 2022, 2025
- Munster Senior Football Championship: 2018, 2019, 2021, 2022, 2023, 2025, 2026
- National Football League: 2020, 2021, 2022, 2025
- Munster Under-21 Football Championship: 2017
- All-Ireland Minor Football Championship: 2014
- Munster Minor Football Championship: 2013, 2014
