= Shane Murphy (Gaelic footballer) =

Irish Gaelic footballer

Personal information
- Born: 1993 (age 32–33) Tralee, County Kerry, Ireland
- Occupation: Insurance broker

Sport
- Sport: Gaelic football
- Position: Goalkeeper
Clubs
- Years: Club
- Kilcummin; Dr Crokes
Club titles
- Kerry titles: 3
- Munster titles: 2
- All-Ireland Titles: 1
Inter-county*
Years	County	Apps (scores)
2017-2019; 2021-	Kerry	3 (0-01)
Inter-county titles
- Munster titles: 4
- All-Irelands: 1
- NFL: 2
- All Stars: 0
- *Inter County team apps and scores correct as of 22:51, 27 July 2023.

Shane Murphy (born 1993) is an Irish Gaelic footballer. At club level he plays with Dr Crokes, having previously lined out with Kilcummin, and at inter-county level with the Kerry senior football team.

== Career ==
Murphy first played Gaelic football to a high standard as a schoolboy at St Brendan's College in Killarney. He was part of the school team that won the Dunloe Cup in 2008, before later being sub-goalkeeper on the Corn Uí Mhuirí-winning team in 2010.

Murphy began his club career at juvenile and underage levels with Kilcummin and won a Kerry MAFC medal in 2010. He later transferred to the Dr Crokes club and won three successive Kerry SFC medals in his first three seasons with his adopted club. Two of these wins were converted into Munster Club SFC titles before claiming an All-Ireland Club SFC medal after a defeat of Slaughtneil in the 2017 final.

Murphy first appeared on the inter-county scene with Kerry during unsuccessful spells with the minor and under-21 teams. He later spent two seasons with the junior team and won an All-Ireland JFC medal after a defeat of Mayo in 2015. Murphy was part of the senior team's extended panel in 2017 and captained the team to the Munster SFC title in 2018. He was dropped from the panel at the end of the season but earned a recall in 2021. Murphy won an All-Ireland SFC medal as sub-goalkeeper after a defeat of Galway in the 2022 final.

Following Kerry's 2026 All-Ireland Final loss to Mayo, Murphy was selected as goalkeeper in The Sunday Game 2026 Team of the Year.

== Honours ==
St Brendan's College

- Corn Uí Mhuirí: 2010
- Dunloe Cup: 2008

Kilcummin

- Kerry Minor A Football Championship: 2010

Dr Crokes

- All-Ireland Senior Club Football Championship: 2017
- Munster Senior Club Football Championship: 2016, 2018
- Kerry Senior Football Championship: 2016, 2017, 2018

Kerry

- All-Ireland Senior Football Championship: 2022, 2025
- Munster Senior Football Championship: 2017, 2018 (c), 2022, 2023
- National Football League: 2017, 2022
- All-Ireland Junior Football Championship: 2015
- Munster Junior Football Championship: 2014, 2015

Sporting positions
Preceded by Johnny Buckley	Kerry senior football team captain 2018	Succeeded by Gavin White
