= Liam Hartnett =

Irish Gaelic footballer and manager (born 1963)

Personal information
- Native name: Liam Ó hAirtnéid (Irish)
- Born: 1963 (age 62–63) Killarney, County Kerry, Ireland

Sport
- Sport: Gaelic football
- Position: Full-back
Club
- Years: Club
- Dr. Crokes
Club titles
- Kerry titles: 1
- Munster titles: 2
- All-Ireland Titles: 1
Inter-county
Years	County	Apps (scores)
1984–1988	Kerry	1 (0–00)
Inter-county titles
- Munster titles: 0
- All-Irelands: 0
- NFL: 0
- All Stars: 0

Liam Hartnett (born 1963) is an Irish former Gaelic footballer who played for the Dr. Crokes club and at inter-county level with the Kerry senior football team.

== Playing career ==
Hartnett first played Gaelic football at juvenile and underage levels with the Dr. Crokes club in Killarney. He progressed to adult level and won a Kerry IFC title in 1985. Hartnett later won two Munster SCFC titles and was at full-back when Dr. Crokes beat Thomas Davis in the 1992 All-Ireland club final.

Hartnett first appeared on the inter-county scene for Kerry as a member of the minor team in 1981. He never played with the under-21 team, however, he made his senior team during the 1984–85 league. Hartnett made his only championship appearance when he lined out at full-back in a Munster semi-final defeat of Limerick in 1989.

== Management career ==
In retirement from playing, Hartnett became involved in team management and coaching. He was part of the Dr. Croke's management team when they won the Kerry SFC title in 2000.

== Honours ==
=== Player ===
Dr Crokes

- All-Ireland Senior Club Football Championship: 1992
- Munster Senior Club Football Championship: 1990, 1991
- Kerry Senior Football Championship: 1991
- Kerry Intermediate Football Championship: 1985

=== Management ===
Dr Crokes

- Kerry Senior Football Championship: 2000
