= 1986 Kerry Senior Football Championship =

Gaelic football competition

- Dates: 21 June - 5 October 1986
- Teams: 19
- Champions: Austin Stacks (10th title); Michael Counihan (captain); Paul Lucey (manager)
- Runners-up: Killarney; John Cahill (captain)

Tournament statistics
- Matches played: 21
- Goals scored: 28 (1.33 per match)
- Points scored: 366 (17.43 per match)
- Top scorer(s): Mikey Sheehy (2-27)

The 1986 Kerry Senior Football Championship was the 86th staging of the Kerry Senior Football Championship since its establishment by the Kerry County Board in 1889.

West Kerry entered the championship as the defending champions, however, they were beaten by Killarney in the second round.

The final was played on 5 October 1986 at Austin Stack Park in Tralee, between Austin Stacks and Killarney, in what was their first ever meeting in the final. Austin Stacks won the match by 1-11 to 1-07 to claim their 10th championship title overall and a first title in seven years.

Mikey Sheehy was the championship's top scorer with 2-27.

== Results ==
=== First round ===
21 June 1986 First round	Castleisland Desmonds	0-20 - 0-04	St. Brendan's	Ardfert Grounds
	W O'Connor 0-5, J Lordan 0-3, C Kearney 0-3, D Lyne 0-3, D Hanafin 0-3, J O'Connor 0-2, D Buckley 0-1.		E Fitzgerald 0-2, J Crowley 0-1, J Fleming 0-1.

22 June 1986 First round	Dr. Crokes	0-13 - 0-04	Gneeveguilla	FitzGerald Stadium
	S O'Shea 0-4, P O'Shea 0-3, P Fleming 0-2, J Clifford 0-2, M O'Grady 0-1, M Buckley 0-1.		S Óg O'Leary 0-1, J Murphy 0-1, A O'Donovan 0-1.

22 June 1986 First round	Feale Rangers	1-08 - 1-07	Castleisland Rangers	Tarbert Grounds
	D Kennelly 0-7, T O'Connell 1-0, J Buckley 0-1.		K Lane 0-5, M Galwey 1-0, P Scanlon 0-2.

=== Second round ===
21 June 1986 Second round	Austin Stacks	0-10 - 0-10	South Kerry	Austin Stack Park
	M Sheehy 0-6, E Moynihan 0-2, B O'Sullivan 0-1, JL McElligott 0-1.		G O'Driscoll 0-4, P O'Connor 0-3, M Fitzgerald 0-2, M O'Donoghue 0-1.

22 June 1986 Second round	Mid Kerry	2-07 - 0-09	Shannon Rangers	Páirc de Búrca
	J O'Sullivan 1-1, T Evans 1-0, W Maher 0-3, J Foley 0-2, M Moriarty 0-1.		J Walsh 0-5, T Walsh 0-2, J Kennedy 0-1, S Stack 0-1.

12 July 1986 Second round	Castleisland Desmonds	4-15 - 0-04	Gweestin Rangers	Castleisland Grounds
	P Horan 2-0, C Kearney 0-6, W O'Connor 1-2, J Lordan 1-1, T O'Sullivan 0-2, D Hanafin 0-2, J O'Connor 0-1, T Leen 0-1.		M Allen 0-2, J Doolan 0-1, B O'Donoghue 0-1.

13 July 1986 Second round replay	Austin Stacks	0-10 - 0-07	South Kerry	Con Keating Park
	M Sheehy 0-6, G Power 0-2, B O'Sullivan 0-1, E Moynihan 0-1.		S Fitzgerald 0-3, P O'Connor 0-2, J O'Sullivan 0-1, G O'Driscoll 0-1.

13 July 1986 Second round	Killarney	1-11 - 0-11	West Kerry	Páirc an Aghasaigh
	D O'Donoghue 0-5, M McAuliffe 0-5, E Mulrooney 1-1.		K Maunsell 0-7, J Doyle 0-2, P Ó Sé 0-1, T Sayers 0-1.

13 July 1986 Second round	Kerins O'Rahilly's	1-09 - 0-10	Beale	Austin Stack Park
	M Griffin 0-5, JT O'Sullivan 1-0, P Hoare 0-2, D Keane 0-1, T Hoare 0-1.		E Liston 0-3, D Moran 0-3, J Costello 0-3, S Linnane 0-1.

13 July 1986 Second round	Kenmare	1-09 - 0-08	John Mitchels	Austin Stack Park
	E McCarthy 0-4, T Spillane 1-0, T Harrington 0-2, M Spillane 0-1, J O'Sullivan 0-1, D O'Sullivan 0-1.		M Dennehy 0-3, T O'Dowd 0-3, P Whyte 0-1, J Sheehy 0-1.

13 July 1986 Second round	Dr. Crokes	0-08 - 0-06	Laune Rangers	J. P. O'Sullivan Park
	P O'Shea 0-3, C Murphy 0-2, P Fleming 0-1, M Buckley 0-1, M Grady 0-1.		J Shannon 0-2, J Sheehan 0-1, T Johnson 0-1, T Fleming 0-1, G Murphy 0-1.

13 July 1986 Second round	Feale Rangers	1-08 - 2-05	Clann na Gael	Moyvane Grounds
	D Kennelly 0-5, D Mulvihill 1-1, JJ McElligott 0-1, T O'Connell 0-1.		G O'Donoghue 1-3, C Lenihan 1-0, M O'Donoghue 0-1, P O'Donoghue 0-1.

26 July 1986 Second round replay	Feale Rangers	0-06 - 1-01	Clann na Gael	Moyvane Grounds
	J Mulvihill 0-2, T O'Connell 0-1, J Buckley 0-1, D Kennelly 0-1, JJ McElligott 0-1.		P O'Donoghue 1-1.

=== Quarter-finals ===
26 July 1986 Quarter-final	Austin Stacks	0-09 - 0-06	Kerins O'Rahilly's	Austin Stack Park
	M Sheehy 0-4, L Kerins 0-2, E Moynihan 0-1, B O'Sullivan 0-1, J Walsh 0-1.		P Hoare 0-3, J Sheehy 0-1, C Sheehy 0-1, S Walsh 0-1.

27 July 1986 Quarter-final	Killarney	0-11 - 1-06	Castleisland Desmonds	FitzGerald Stadium
	M McAuliffe 0-4, E Mulrooney 0-3, A McAuliffe 0-2, J Cahill 0-1, S Cronin 0-1.		P Horan 1-0, J O'Connor 0-2, D Hanafin 0-2, C Kearney 0-1, D Lyne 0-1.

27 July 1986 Quarter-final	Dr. Crokes	3-11 - 0-11	Kenmare	FitzGerald Stadium
	P O'Shea 2-1, C Murphy 1-3, S O'Shea 0-3, N O'Leary 0-2, J Clifford 0-1, J Galvin 0-1.		P Spillane 0-5, E McCarthy 0-3, M Spillane 0-2, J Sullivan-Morgan 0-1.

2 August 1986 Quarter-final	Mid Kerry	2-11 - 0-11	Feale Rangers	Páirc de Búrca
	W Maher 2-5, J O'Sullivan 0-2, M Heffernan 0-2, T Evans 0-1, D O'Sullivan 0-1.		D Kennelly 0-5, T O'Connell 0-2, J Wrenn 0-2, T Mulvihill 0-1, JP O'Connell 0-1.

=== Semi-finals ===
10 August 1986 Semi-final	Austin Stacks	2-17 - 2-07	Mid Kerry	FitzGerald Stadium
	M Sheehy 1-7, G Power 1-2, JL McElligott 0-3, J Walsh 0-2, E Moynihan 0-2, L Kerins 0-1.		W Maher 0-4, F Courtney 1-0, J O'Sullivan 1-0, D Hartnett 0-1, T Evans 0-1, M Heffernan 0-1.

10 August 1986 Semi-final	Killarney	0-07 - 0-07	Dr. Crokes	FitzGerald Stadium
	M McAuliffe 0-4, M Cronin 0-2, D O'Donoghue 0-1.		P O'Shea 0-3, S O'Shea 0-2, M Buckley 0-1, P Donoghue 0-1.

31 August 1986 Semi-final replay	Killarney	0-10 - 1-04	Dr. Crokes	FitzGerald Stadium
	M McAuliffe 0-5, M Cronin 0-1, M Murphy 0-1, D O'Donoghue 0-1, K Murphy 0-1, T Regan 0-1.		C Murphy 1-0, P O'Donoghue 0-2, P O'Shea 0-1, N O'Leary 0-1.

=== Final ===
5 October 1986 Final	Austin Stacks	1-11 - 1-07	Killarney	Austin Stack Park
	M Sheehy 1-4, JL McElligott 0-3, G Power 0-2, E Moynihan 0-2.		M McAuliffe 0-5, S Kelliher 1-0, M Murphy 0-1, D O'Donoghue 0-1.	Referee: D O'Sullivan (Currow)

== Championship statistics ==
=== Top scorers ===
Overall

Rank	Player	Club	Tally	Total	Matches	Average
1	Mikey Sheehy	Austin Stacks	2-27	33	5	6.60
2	Mike McAuliffe	Killarney	0-23	23	5	4.60
3	Willie Maher	Mid Kerry	2-12	18	3	6.00
3	Denis Kennelly	Feale Rangers	0-18	18	4	4.50
5	Pat O'Shea	Dr. Crokes	2-11	17	5	3.40

In a single game

Rank	Player	Club	Tally	Total	Opposition
1	Willie Maher	Mid Kerry	2-05	11	Feale Rangers
2	Mikey Sheehy	Austin Stacks	1-07	10	Mid Kerry
3	Pat O'Shea	Dr. Crokes	2-01	7	Kenmare
3	Mikey Sheehy	Austin Stacks	1-04	7	Killarney
3	Denis Kennelly	Feale Rangers	0-07	7	Castleisland Rangers
3	Kevin Maunsell	West Kerry	0-07	7	Killarney
7	Philip Horan	Castleisland Desmonds	2-00	6	Gweestin Rangers
7	John O'Donoghue	Clann na Gael	1-03	6	Feale Rangers
7	Connie Murphy	Dr. Crokes	1-03	6	Kenmare
7	Mikey Sheehy	Austin Stacks	0-06	6	South Kerry
7	Mikey Sheehy	Austin Stacks	0-06	6	South Kerry
7	Christy Kearney	Castleisland Desmonds	0-06	6	Gweestin Rangers

=== Miscellaneous ===
- Austin Stacks win their first title since 1979.
- Austin Stacks move level with John Mitchels at the top of the Roll of Honor with 10 titles.
