= Connie Murphy (Gaelic footballer) =

Irish Gaelic footballer, selector and manager

Personal information
- Native name: Conchur Ó Murchú (Irish)
- Born: 1965 (age 60–61) Killarney, County Kerry, Ireland
- Occupation: Retired Garda Síochána

Sport
- Sport: Gaelic football
- Position: Centre-back
Club
- Years: Club
- Dr Crokes
Club titles
- Kerry titles: 2
- Munster titles: 2
- All-Ireland Titles: 1
Inter-county
Years	County	Apps (scores)
1987–1995	Kerry	15 (1–02)
Inter-county titles
- Munster titles: 1
- All-Irelands: 0
- NFL: 0
- All Stars: 1

Cornelius Murphy (born 1965) is an Irish former Gaelic footballer who played for the Dr Crokes club and at inter-county level with the Kerry senior football team.

He is a rare Kerry All Star who never won the All-Ireland Senior Football Championship.

== Playing career ==
Murphy first played Gaelic football at juvenile and underage levels with the Dr Crokes club in Killarney. He won a Kerry U21FC title in 1986. By that stage Murphy had also joined the club's top adult team, having won a Kerry IFC title in 1985. He later won two Munster SCFC titles and was man of the match when Dr Crokes beat Thomas Davis in the 1992 All-Ireland club final. Murphy's club career ended shortly after winning a second Kerry SFC medal in 2000.

Murphy first appeared on the inter-county scene for Kerry as a member of the minor team in 1983. He later spent a year with the under-21 team, however, his underage career ended without success. Murphy made his senior team debut during the 1987–88 league, however, his career coincided with a relatively fallow period in terms of success. In spite of this, he was selected on the All-Star team in 1989 and won a Munster SFC medal in 1991.

== Management career ==
Murphy was appointed manager of the Kerry junior football team in 2002. His two-year tenure in charge saw the team win consecutive Munster JFC titles, however, Kerry lost the 2002 All-Ireland junior final to Wicklow.

== Honours ==
=== Player ===
Dr Crokes

- All-Ireland Senior Club Football Championship: 1992
- Munster Senior Club Football Championship: 1990, 1991
- Kerry Senior Football Championship: 1991, 2000
- Kerry Senior Club Football Championship: 1987, 1990, 1992, 1993, 1996
- East Kerry Senior Football Championship: 1986, 1990, 1991, 1992, 1993, 1995, 2000
- Kerry Intermediate Football Championship: 1985
- Kerry Under-21 Football Championship: 1986

Kerry

- Munster Senior Football Championship: 1991

=== Management ===
Kerry

- Munster Junior Football Championship: 2002, 2003
