= 1991–92 All-Ireland Senior Club Football Championship =

Football Championship

- Teams: 33
- Champions: Dr. Crokes (1st title); Seánie O'Shea (captain)
- Runners-up: Thomas Davis; Dave Foran (captain)

The 1991–92 All-Ireland Senior Club Football Championship was the 22nd staging of the All-Ireland Senior Club Football Championship since its establishment by the Gaelic Athletic Association in 1970-71.

Lavey were the defending champions, however, they failed to qualify after being beaten in the Derry County Championship.

On 17 March 1992, Dr Crokes won the championship following a 1-11 to 0-13 defeat of Thomas Davis in the All-Ireland final at Croke Park. It was their first ever championship title.

== Munster ==
=== First round ===
20 October 1991 First round	St. Finbarr's	1-10 - 2-08	Dr. Crokes	Ballincollig Sportsfield
	C Ryan 1-2, T Power 0-2, M Barry 0-2, J O'Mahony 0-2, N Leonard 0-1, B O'Connell 0-1.		G O'Shea 1-0, V Casey 1-0, R Neher 0-3, C Doherty 0-1, S O'Shea 0-1, N O'Leary 0-1, C Murphy 0-1, D Cooper 0-1.

26 October 1991 First round	Doonbeg	4-12 - 0-11	Dungarvan	Páirc Uí Sheancháin
	P Conway 3-0, G Killeen 0-8, D Hayes 1-1, M McInerney 0-2, L McInenrey 0-1.		P Ferncombe 0-4, M Ferncombe 0-3, D Callaghan 0-2, D Lyons 0-1, D McGrath 0-1.

=== Semi-finals ===
2 November 1991 Semi-final	Hospital-Herbertstown	0-07 - 1-11	Doonbeg	FitzGerald Park, Kilmallock
	A Garvey 0-3, L Garvey 0-2, P Fenton 0-1, I Farrell 0-1.		G Killeen 0-6, P Conway 1-0, M McInerney 0-1, D Bermingham 0-1, J Downes 0-1, D Hickey 0-1, S O'Donovan 0-1.

3 November 1991 Semi-final	Dr Crokes	1-16 - 3-07	Fethard	FitzGerald Stadium
	N O'Leary 1-1, R Neher 0-4, G O'Shea 0-4, Pat O'Shea 0-3, V Casey 0-1, C Murphy 0-1, C Doherty 0-1, Pádraig O'Shea 0-1.		S Coen 2-0, M Coen 0-4, M Spillane 1-0, O Cummins 0-1, M Riordan 0-1, B Burke 0-1.

=== Final ===
1 December 1990 Final	Dr Crokes	2-10 - 0-08	Doonbeg	Bruff Sportsfield
	Pat O'Shea 1-7, C O'Shea 1-0, G O'Shea 0-1, V Casey 0-1, S O'Shea 0-1.		G Killeen 0-5, M McInerney 0-1, F McInerney 0-1, D Hayes 0-1.

== Quarter-final ==
9 February 1992 Quarter-final	Parnells	1-07 - 3-09	Dr Crokes	Emerald GAA Grounds

== Semi-finals ==
1 March 1992 Semi-final	Thomas Davis	2-09 - 1-07	Castleblayney Faughs	Parnell Park

1 March 1992 Semi-final	Corofin	1-05 - 3-04	Dr Crokes	Tuam Stadium

== Final ==
17 March 1992 Final	Dr Crokes	1-11 - 0-13	Thomas Davis	Croke Park

== Statistics ==
=== Miscellaneous ===
- Corofin won the Connacht Club Championship title for the first time in their history.
