= Davy Keogh =

Irish hurler

Personal information
- Native name: Daithí Mac Eochaidh (Irish)
- Born: 1999 (age 26–27) Goatstown, Dublin, Ireland
- Occupation: Carpenter

Sport
- Sport: Hurling
- Position: Midfield
Club
- Years: Club
- Thomas Davis
Club titles
- Dublin titles: 0
Inter-county
- Years: County
- 2019-present: Dublin
Inter-county titles
- Leinster titles: 0
- All-Irelands: 0
- NHL: 0
- All Stars: 0

David Keogh (born 1999) is an Irish hurler who plays for Dublin Senior Championship club Thomas Davis and at inter-county level with the Dublin senior hurling team. He usually lines out at midfield.

== Career ==
A member of the Thomas Davis club in Tallaght, Keogh first came to prominence on the inter-county scene as a member of the Dublin minor team that won the 2016 Leinster Championship. He subsequently lined out with the Dublin under-21 team. Keogh joined the Dublin senior hurling team in 2019.

== Honours ==
Dublin

- Leinster Minor Hurling Championship: 2016
