= Seanie O'Shea =

Irish hurler and Gaelic footballer

Sean O'Shea
Personal information
- Born: Kenmare, County Kerry

Sport
- Sport: Gaelic football
Club
- Years: Club
- 1980s-2000s: Dr Crokes
Club titles
- Kerry titles: 2
- Munster titles: 2
- All-Ireland Titles: 1
Inter-county
- Years: County
- 1980s-1990s: Kerry

Seanie O'Shea is a footballer and hurler from Killarney, County Kerry. He played with the Kerry inter-county hurling team during the 1990s. He played in the famous 1993 Munster Championship win over Waterford. He won an All-Ireland Senior Club Football Championship with Dr Crokes in 1992, and returned as a trainer in later years. He is a brother of former Kerry manager Pat O'Shea.

After retiring from playing, he took up management of teams at all levels with Dr Crokes.

In 2010 and 2011, he was part of John Meyler's backroom team that won the 2011 Christy Ring Cup after losing out in the 2010 final.

In 2011, he was appointed manager of the Kerry minor hurling side. He led the team to the 2012 All Ireland B title with a win over Roscommon in the final. In 2013 he mad it 2 in a row with a win over Meath in the final.
