= 2016 Dublin Senior Football Championship =

- 2016 Craobh Sinsear Peile; Bhaile Átha Cliath

Tournament details
- County: Dublin
- Year: 2016

Winners
- Champions: St. Vincent's (28th win)
- Manager: Tommy Conroy
- Captain: Diarmuid Connolly

Promotion/Relegation
- Promoted team(s): Fingallians
- Relegated team(s): O'Tooles

The 2016 Dublin Senior Football Championship was the 130th edition of Dublin GAA's premier gaelic football tournament for senior clubs in County Dublin, Ireland. 32 teams participate, with the winner representing Dublin in the Leinster Senior Club Football Championship.

Ballyboden St. Enda's were the defending Dublin (and All-Ireland champions) having defeated St. Vincent's in the 2015 Dublin championship final. They gave up their titles in the last sixteen stage when losing to Kilmacud Crokes.

On 5 November 2016, St. Vincent's claimed their 28th Dublin S.F.C. title and 4th in 5 years when defeating Castleknock (who reached their first final after only two years in the senior grade and only their 18th year in existence after being established in 1998) in Parnell Park in the final by 0–15 to 0–10.

O'Tooles were relegated to the Intermediate Football Championship for 2017 after they failed to fulfill their Round 1 Senior 'B' Replay with Naomh Mearnóg this year. They will be replaced by Paul Flynn's Fingallians who claimed this year's I.F.C. title.

== Format ==
The championship has a straight knock-out format. The losers of the Round 1 matches enter the Senior 'B' Football Championship. Losers of Round 1 of the Senior 'B' Championship enter a relegation playoff if a non-reserve side wins the Dublin Intermediate Football Championship.

== Promoted to SFC in 2015 ==
- None

== Relegated from SFC in 2015 ==
- None

== Senior 'A' Football Championship ==
=== Senior 'A' Round 1 ===
All 32 teams enter the championship at this stage. The 16 winners enter Round 2 while the 16 losers enter the Senior 'B' Football Championship.

28 April 2016; 18:45; Round 1	St. Vincent's	2-16 - 0-4	Erin's Isle	Parnell Park
28 April 2016; 18:45; Round 1	Shane B. Carthy and Tomas Quinn 1-0 each			Parnell Park

28 April 2016; 19:00; Round 1	St. Sylvester's	1-13 - 1-8	UCD	Balgriffin

28 April 2016; 19:00; Round 1	Whitehall Colmcille	2-17 - 1-7	St. Patrick's Palmerstown	Blakestown

28 April 2016; 19:00; Round 1	Lucan Sarsfields	2-10 - 1-7	Round Towers Clondalkin	Newcastle

28 April 2016; 19:00; Round 1	St. Jude's	0-15 - 0-5	Cuala	O'Toole Park; Referee: James King (Garda)
28 April 2016; 19:00; Round 1	Niall Coakley 0-7 (0-2f), Kevin McManamon 0-3 (0-2f, 1 '45), Tom Lahiff 0-2, Rob Martina, Paul Courtney, Declan Donnelly 0-1 each		Martin Cahilan, John Sheanon, Con O'Callaghan, Luke Keating (0-1f), S O'Brien 0-1 each	O'Toole Park; Referee: James King (Garda)

28 April 2016; 19:00; Round 1	Raheny	5-18 - 2-1	St. Mary's Saggart	St. Margaret's
28 April 2016; 19:00; Round 1	Darren Byrne, Brian Fenton, David Shatwell, Eoghan Smyth, Shane Homan 1-0 each			St. Margaret's

28 April 2016; 20:15; Round 1	Skerries Harps	1-12 - 1-11	Thomas Davis	Parnell Park
28 April 2016; 20:15; Round 1	Harry Dawson 0-7 (0-4f), Gerry Daly 1-0, Paul Cashman and Bryan Cullen 0-2 each, Shane Davis (1 '45)		Paul Hudson 0-6 (0-1f), Ryan Deegan 1-0, Ciarán Farrelly 0-1	Parnell Park

29 April 2016; 18:45; Round 1	Castleknock	2-12 - 1-12	St. Oliver Plunkett's/Eoghan Ruadh	Parnell Park; Referee: Danny Harrington (St. Sylvester's)
29 April 2016; 18:45; Round 1	James Sherry 2-1, Des Carlos 0-4f, John Kindlon 0-2, Tom Shiels, Matt Griffin, Shane Boland, Collie Lynch, Tommy Corcoran 0-1 each	Report	Gareth Smith 0-6 (0-4f), Declan Lally 1-0, Tomas Corrigan, Alan Brogan, Bernard Brogan (0-1f) 0-2 each	Parnell Park; Referee: Danny Harrington (St. Sylvester's)

29 April 2016; 19:00; Round 1	Ballymun Kickhams	9-15 - 1-3	O'Tooles	Garristown

29 April 2016; 19:00; Round 1	Ballinteer St. John's	2-13 - 0-8	St. Peregrine's	Monastery Road
29 April 2016; 19:00; Round 1	Robbie Gaughan 2-0			Monastery Road

29 April 2016; 19:00; Round 1	Ballyboden St. Enda's	2-12 - 0-12	Naomh Olaf	O'Toole Park
29 April 2016; 19:00; Round 1	Ryan Basquel 1-1 Sam Molony 1-0, Colm Basquel 0-2	Report	David Byrne 0-1	O'Toole Park

29 April 2016; 19:00; Round 1	Parnells	2-9 - 0-13	St. Anne's	Kilbarrack

29 April 2016; 19:00; Round 1	Na Fianna	2-17 - 0-15	Templeogue Synge Street	Finglas
29 April 2016; 19:00; Round 1	JJ Martin and David Quinn 1-0 each			Finglas

29 April 2016; 19:00; Round 1	Clontarf	2-8 - 0-6	Fingal Ravens	Drumnigh

29 April 2016; 19:00; Round 1	Kilmacud Crokes	2-11 - 1-6	Naomh Mearnóg	Cloughran
29 April 2016; 19:00; Round 1	Ross McGowan and Callum Pearson 1-0 each		Andrew Sheppard 1-0	Cloughran

29 April 2016; 20:15; Round 1	St. Brigid's	3-15 - 2-5	St. Maur's	Parnell Park
29 April 2016; 20:15; Round 1	Lorcan McCarthy 0-6, Niall O'Dea 1-2, Alan McCarrick 1-1, Kevin Bonner 1-0, Sean Murray and Emlyn Mulligan 0-2 each, Alan Daly 0-1		Conor McGuire 1-1, Conor McGuiness 1-0, Eoin Fletcher, Michael Reilly, Danny Byrne, Ciaran Reddin (0-1f) 0-1 each	Parnell Park

=== Senior 'A' Round 2 ===
The 16 winners of the First Round matches play each other in this round. The 8 winners proceed to the Quarter-Finals while the 8 losers exit the championship.

7 October 2016; 19:30; Round 2	Lucan Sarsfields	3-17 - 1-10	Ballinteer St. John's	Kiltipper Road
7 October 2016; 19:30; Round 2		Report		Kiltipper Road

8 October 2016; 15:00; Round 2	St. Jude's	1-15 - 1-3	Clontarf	Parnell Park
8 October 2016; 15:00; Round 2		Report		Parnell Park

8 October 2016; 16:45; Round 2	Kilmacud Crokes	1-14 - 0-9	Ballyboden St. Enda's	Parnell Park
8 October 2016; 16:45; Round 2		Report		Parnell Park

9 October 2016; 14:15; Round 2	Ballymun Kickhams	1-16 - 0-13	St. Brigid's	Parnell Park
9 October 2016; 14:15; Round 2		Report		Parnell Park

9 October 2016; 14:15; Round 2	Skerries Harps	2-20 - 1-10	Whitehall Colmcille	Garristown
9 October 2016; 14:15; Round 2		Report		Garristown

9 October 2016; 15:00; Round 2	Castleknock	1-13 - 0-12	St. Sylvester's	Drumnigh
9 October 2016; 15:00; Round 2		Report		Drumnigh

9 October 2016; 15:45; Round 2	Raheny	2-16 - 0-7	Parnells	Garristown
9 October 2016; 15:45; Round 2		Report		Garristown

9 October 2016; 16:00; Round 2	St. Vincent's	1-14 - 1-6	Na Fianna	Parnell Park
9 October 2016; 16:00; Round 2		Report		Parnell Park

=== Senior 'A' Quarter Finals ===
19 October 2016; 18:45; Quarter-Final	Castleknock	2-14 - 0-10	Skerries Harps	Parnell Park
19 October 2016; 18:45; Quarter-Final	Des Carlos 0-7 (0-6f), Shane Boland 1-2, Mikey Galvin 1-2 (0-1f), Ciaran Kilkenny, Graham Hannigan, Colin Lynch 0-1 each		Steven Smith 0-8 (0-7f), Colin Daly and Graham Cullen 0-1 each	Parnell Park

19 October 2016; 20:15; Quarter-Final	St. Jude's	0-14 - 1-8	Kilmacud Crokes	Parnell Park
19 October 2016; 20:15; Quarter-Final	Kevin McManamon 0-5 (0-3f), Niall Coakley 0-3 (0-1f), Declan Donnelly 0-2 (0-1f), Seamus Ryan, Ross O’Brien, Kieran Doherty, Ronan Joyce 0-1 each		Mark Vaughan 0-4 (0-3f), Pat Burke 1-0, Paul Mannion 0-2 (0-1f), Callum Pearson, Ross O’Carroll 0-1 each	Parnell Park

20 October 2016; 18:45; Quarter-Final	Ballymun Kickhams	2-23 - 1-8	Raheny	Parnell Park
20 October 2016; 18:45; Quarter-Final	Dean Rock 0-9 (0-6f, 0-1 45), Ted Furman 1-3, Paddy Small 1-1, Jason Whelan 0-4, Alan Hubbard and Karl Connolly, 0-2 each, John Small, Kevin Leahy 0-1 each		Gavin Ivory 0-3, Sean McMahon 1-0, David Shatwell 0-2, Brian Fenton, James O’Kane (f), Donal Ryan 0-1 each	Parnell Park

20 October 2016; 20:15; Quarter-Final	St. Vincent's	1-14 - 2-8	Lucan Sarsfields	Parnell Park
20 October 2016; 20:15; Quarter-Final	Ruairi Trainor 1-1, Shane B. Carthy 0-4, Tomas Quinn 0-2(1f), Albert Martin, Diarmuid Connolly, Enda Varley (f), Nathan Mullins, Cormac Diamond, Joe Feeney, Gavin Burke 0-1 each		Brendan Gallagher 1-4 (1-0 pen, 0-1f), Andrew Hope 1-0, CJ Smyth, Dan Gallagher, Rory Kelly, Thomas Brennan (1f) 0-1 each	Parnell Park

=== Senior 'A' Semi-Finals ===
26 October 2016; 19:30; Semi-Final	St. Vincent's	0-12 - 0-11	Ballymun Kickhams	Parnell Park; Referee: Barry Tiernan
26 October 2016; 19:30; Semi-Final	Diarmuid Connolly 0-4, Tomas Quinn 0-3f, Enda Varley 0-2f, Albert Martin, Ruairi Trainor, Ger Brennan 0-1 each	Report	Dean Rock 0-8 (0-6f), Ted Furman 0-2, James Burke 0-1.	Parnell Park; Referee: Barry Tiernan

27 October 2016; 19:30; Semi-Final	Castleknock	0-11 - 1-4	St. Jude's	Parnell Park; Referee: James King
27 October 2016; 19:30; Semi-Final	Des Carlos 0-9 (0-7f), Mikey Galvin, Ben Galvin 0-1 each	Report	Kevin McManamon 1-1, Kieran Doherty, Declan Donnelly, Niall Coakley (0-1f) 0-1 each	Parnell Park; Referee: James King

=== Senior 'A' Final ===
5 November 2016; 3:00pm Final	St. Vincent's	0-15 - 0-10	Castleknock	Parnell Park; Referee: D. Sheppard
5 November 2016; 3:00pm Final	Tomas Quinn (0-5, 2 frees); Enda Varley (0-4, 1 free); Gavin Burke (0-2); Shane B. Carthy, Cormac Diamond, Ruari Trainor and Joe Feeney 0-1 each	Report	Des Carlos (0-5 frees); Ciaran Kilkenny and K Kindlon 0-2 each, E O’Brien (0-1).	Parnell Park; Referee: D. Sheppard

== Senior 'B' Football Championship ==
=== Senior 'B' Round 1 ===
The 16 losers from the First Round play off in this round. The 8 winners proceed to the Senior 'B' Quarter-Finals while the 8 losers will exit the championship. One team was designated home advantage for each tie in a random draw. The match involving O'Toole's and Naomh Mearnóg was abandoned while the teams were level after 55 minutes due to a brawl involving players, management and supporters.

9 October 2016; Round 1	St. Maur's	0-14 - 3-9	Templeogue Synge Street	Rush

9 October 2016; Round 1	St. Peregrine's	2-7 - 1-7	Fingal Ravens	Blakestown

9 October 2016; Round 1	UCD	scr - w/o	St. Anne's	Belfield

9 October 2016; Round 1	O'Toole's	abandoned	Naomh Mearnóg	Blunden Drive

9 October 2016; Round 1	Naomh Olaf	3-16 - 1-4	Erin's Isle	O'Brien Park

9 October 2016; Round 1	Round Towers Clondalkin	2-6 - 2-11	Cuala	Monastery Road

9 October 2016; Round 1	St. Oliver Plunkett's/Eoghan Ruadh	2-15 - 0-5	St. Patrick's Palmerstown	Martin Savage Park

9 October 2016; Round 1	St. Mary's Saggart	1-19 - 4-19	Thomas Davis	Saggart

Not Played; Round 1 Replay	Naomh Mearnóg	null & viod	O'Toole's

=== Senior 'B' Quarter-Finals ===
23 October 2016; Quarter-Final	Naomh Olaf	1-7 - 2-14	Cuala	O'Brien Park

29 October 2016; Quarter-Final	Thomas Davis	1-14 - 1-9	St. Peregrine's	Kiltipper Road

29 October 2016; Quarter-Final	Templeogue Synge Street	2-11 - 0-12	St. Anne's	Dolphin Park

29 October 2016; Quarter-Final	Bye	-vs-	St. Oliver Plunkett's/Eoghan Ruadh	???

=== Senior 'B' Semi-Finals ===
16 November 2016; 18:45; Semi-Final	St. Oliver Plunkett's/Eoghan Ruadh	1-14 - 1-13	Thomas Davis	Parnell Park

16 November 2016; 20:15; Semi-Final	Cuala	2-10 - 1-10	Templeogue Synge Street	Parnell Park

=== Senior 'B' Final ===
23 November 2016; Senior 'B' Final	St. Oliver Plunkett's/Eoghan Ruadh	0-12 - 0-11	Cuala	Parnell Park
