= Johnny Buckley (Gaelic footballer) =

Irish Gaelic footballer

Personal information
- Native name: Seán Ó Buachalla (Irish)
- Born: 31 July 1989 (age 37) Tralee, Ireland
- Occupation: Coach Tour Operator
- Height: 1.91 m (6 ft 3 in)

Sport
- Sport: Gaelic Football
- Position: Midfield
Club
- Years: Club
- 2007–: Dr Crokes
Club titles
- Kerry titles: 7
- Munster titles: 5
- All-Ireland Titles: 1
College
- Years: College
- UCC
College titles
- Sigerson titles: 1
Inter-county
Years	County	Apps (scores)
2012–2017	Kerry	13 (0-19)
Inter-county titles
- Munster titles: 3
- All-Irelands: 1
- NFL: 1
- All Stars: 1

Johnny Buckley (31 July 1989) is a Gaelic footballer from Killarney, County Kerry. He has played with Kerry at every level and plays with the Dr Crokes club.

He first played with the Kerry minor team in 2006, winning the Munster championship and later played in the All-Ireland final loss to Roscommon. He was underage again in 2007 but had little success. He moved to the Under 21 team in 2008, winning Munster and All Ireland medals.

At club level he has 7 Kerry County championships . He has also won 5 Munster club titles between 2006 and 2018. He has also won a number of County league Div 1, County club championship and East Kerry championship titles. With UCC, he won both Sigerson Cup and Cork County football titles in 2011.

On St Patrick's Day 2017 he captained Dr. Crokes to their second ever All Ireland Senior Club title and he lifted the Andy Merrigan Cup jointly with a young Dr. Crokes supporter Amy O'Connor, who had been battling cancer.
