= 2016–17 All-Ireland Senior Club Football Championship =

Irish Football Championship

- Dates: 16 October 2016 – 17 March 2017
- Teams: 32
- Sponsor: Allied Irish Bank
- Champions: Dr Crokes (2nd title); Johnny Buckley (captain); Pat O'Shea (manager)
- Runners-up: Slaughtneil; Francis McEldowney (captain); Mickey Moran (manager)

Tournament statistics
- Matches played: 31
- Top scorer(s): Niall McNamee (1–27)

The 2016–17 All-Ireland Senior Club Football Championship was the 47th annual Gaelic football club championship since its establishment in the 1970–71 season. The winning team received the Andy Merrigan Cup.

The defending champion was Ballyboden St Enda's who defeated Castlebar Mitchels on 17 March 2016 to win a first title; however, Kilmacud Crokes defeated Ballyboden in the second round of the 2016 Dublin SFC.

Dr Crokes won a second title, defeating Slaughtneil by 1–9 to 1–7 in the final at Croke Park on 17 March 2017 (St Patrick's Day). The winning captain was Johnny Buckley.

== Connacht ==
=== Quarter-final ===
5 November 2016 Quarter-final	Castlebar Mitchels	1-10 - 0-05	Tourlestrane	McHale Park
	N Douglas 1-5 (0-3f), J Durcan 0-2, D Stenson 0-1 (0-1f), C Costello 0-1 (0-1f), F Durkin 0-1.	Report	B Egan 0-1 (0-1f), G Gaughan 0-1, L Gaughan 0-1 (0-1f), N Egan 0-1, P Harte 0-1 (0-1f).

=== Semi-finals ===
13 November 2016 Semi-Final	St Brigid's	2-18 - 1-07	Aughawillan	Páirc Seán Mac Diarmada
15:30	D Dolan 1-2; B Stack 1-1; S Kilbride 0-4; E Sheehy 0-3; K Mannion & A Gleeson 0-2 each; N McInerney, D Sheehy, P Kelly & M Daly 0-1 each.	Report	M Plunkett 0-3 (0-2 ’45); S Gilheaney 1-0; B Prior, S Flanagan, N Beirne & M Quinn 0-1 each.	Referee: L Devaney

13 November 2016 Semi-Final	Castlebar Mitchels	0-14 - 0-17 (aet)	Corofin	McHale Park
15:30	N Douglas 0-10 (8f 1'45), D Stenson 0-2, Paddy Durcan, C Costello 0-1 each.	Report	I Burke, J Leonard (2f) 0-4 each, G Sice 0-3 (3f), M Farragher 0-2, D Burke, R Steede, M Lundy, K Molloy 0-1 each.	Referee: Paddy Neilan (Roscommon)

=== Final ===
27 November 2016 Final	Corofin	2-13 - 0-05	St Brigid's	Páirc Seán Mac Diarmada
15:30	J Leonard 1-3 (0-2f), Michael Farragher 1-2, G Sice 0-4 (0-1f), Dylan Wall 0-1, I Burke 0-1, D Burke 0-1, M Lundy 0-1.	Report	E Sheehy 0-2, K Mannion 0-2 (0-2f), P Kelly 0-1.	Referee: Jerome Henry (Mayo)

== Leinster ==
=== First round ===
30 October 2016 First round	Baltinglass	0-09 - 0-10	Seán O'Mahony's	Aughrim Park
	J Kelly 0-5f, J McGrath 0-3; H Sinnott 0-1.	Report	B McLoughlin 0-3, K McLoughlin 0-2, S Kilcoyne 0-2, C Cawley 0-1, C Finnegan 0-1f, D Dowling 0-1.

30 October 2016 First round	Gusserane O'Rahilly's	0-04 - 5-22	Rhode	Wexford Park
	S Cullen (f), A Flynn, P Wallace, P Wall (0-1 each).	Report	N McNamee (1-8, 0-2 frees), J McPadden, P McPadden 1-2 each; R McNamee (1-1), A Sullivan (1-0), C McNamee (0-2), S Sullivan, A McNamee, P Sullivan, S Hannon, N Darby, D Garry, G O'Connell (0-1 each).

30 October 2016 First round	Mullinalaghta St Columba's	1-17 - 2-09	Stradbally	Glennon Brothers Pearse Park
	A McElligott (1-2), R Brady (0-4), D McGivney (0-3, all frees); G Rogers (0-2), J Matthews (0-2, one free), D McElligott (0-1), S Mulligan (0-1), J McGivney (0-1), M Cunningham (0-1).	Report	G Comerford (1-1, goal from penalty, point from free), C Delaney (1-0), J Dillon (0-3, one ‘45), J Donohue (0-2), P Fitzpatrick (0-2), G Ramsbottom (0-1).

=== Quarter-finals ===
13 November 2016 Quarter-final	Seán O'Mahony's	1-08 - 0-08	Sarsfields	Drogheda Park
	Sean O'Mahony's - C Finnegan 0-4 (4f), S Fisher 1-0, S Kilcoyne 0-2, B McLaughlin, D Dowling 0-1 each.	Report	R Cahill 0-4 (fs), A Smith 0-2, C Hartley, B McCormack 0-1 each.

13 November 2016 Quarter-final	Rhode	1-12 - 1-09	Simonstown Gaels	O'Connor Park
	N McNamee 0-5 (2fs), C McNamee 1-1, D Garry 0-2, B Darby, A Sullivan, N Darby, P McPadden (f) 0-1 each.	Report	S Tobin 0-5 (2fs), E Donoghue 1-0, P McKeever 0-2 (1f), J Lyons, M Brennan (45).

13 November 2016 Quarter-final	Mullinalaghta St Columba's	0-14 - 1-09	St Loman's	Glennon Brothers Pearse Park
	D McGivney (0-6), J McGivney (0-5), S Mulligan (0-1), J Matthews (0-1), A McElligott (0-1).	Report	J Heslin (0-4), P Dowdall (1-0), S Dempsey (0-3), K Kilmurray (0-1), P Sharry (0-1);

13 November 2016 Quarter-final	Palatine	0-08 - 0-16	St Vincent's	Dr Cullen Park
	S O'Neill 0-3 (1f), J Kenny, J Kane, S Reilly, C Crowley, B Kelly (f) 0-1 each.	Report	C Diamond, M Quinn (3f) 0-5 each, S Carthy 0-3, E Varley, A Martin, R Trainor 0-1 each. Palatine:

=== Semi-finals ===
13 November 2016 Semi-Final	Seán O'Mahony's	1-05 - 0-12	Rhode	Drogheda Park
15:30	C Finnegan 0-4 (3f); S Fisher 1-0 (pen); S Kilcoyne 0-1.	Report	N McNamee 0-8 (5f); P McPadden 0-2; B Darby, R McNamee 0-1 each.	Referee: J Hickey

13 November 2016 Semi-Final	Mullinalaghta St Columba's	0-11 - 2-12	St Vincent's	Pearse Park
15:30	D McGivney 0-3 (3f), J Matthews (2f), R Brady, G Rogers 0-2 each, S Mulligan, J McGivney 0-1 each.	Report	S Carthy 1-3, T Quinn (0-2f) 1-2, E Varley 0-2, Cormac Diamond, R Trainor, D Connolly, J Feeney, A Martin 0-1 each.	Referee: D Moore

=== Final ===
12 November 2016 Final	Rhode	0-12 - 1-16	St Vincent's	O'Moore Park
15:30	N McNamee (0-6, 5 frees), D Garry (0-2); N Darby (0-1); C Heavey (0-1); C McNamee (0-1); P McPadden (0-1).	Report	D Connolly (1-2), T Quinn (0-4, 2 frees), G Burke (0-3), E Varley (0-2), S Carthy (0-2), Cormac Diamond (0-1); R Trainor (0-1), J Feeney (0-1).	Referee: Brendan Cawley (Kildare)

== Munster ==
=== Quarter-finals ===
30 October 2016 Quarter-final	Dr Crokes	1-14 - 0-08	Kilmurry-Ibrickane	Quilty
	D Casey 1-2 (1-0 pen), C Cooper 0-3 (2f), T Brosnan, K O’Leary 0-2 each, G O’Shea, B Looney, E Brosnan, J Kiely, M Burns 0-1 each.	Report	K Sexton (2f), I McInerney (3f) 0-3 each, S Hickey, N Hickey 0-1 each.

30 October 2016 Quarter-final	Monaleen	0-07 - 2-11	Carbery Rangers	Gaelic Grounds
	G Collins (0-3, 2 frees); B Fitzpatrick, P Kinnerk, T Barry and N Loughran (0-1 each).	Report	J Hayes (1-3, 1-0 pen, 2 frees); A Jennings (1-0); J O’Rourke, C O’Donovan (0-2 each); S Hayes, M Kelly, J O’Riordan and B Shanahan (0-1 each).

=== Semi-finals ===
13 November 2016 Semi-Final	Dr Crokes	1-12 - 0-09	Loughmore-Castleiney	Lewis Road
15:30	C Cooper (1-3, 0-1 free); D Casey (0-2, 0-2 frees); E Brosnan, J Kiely, G White, G O’Shea, J Buckley, B Looney, T Brosnan (0-1 each).	Report	L McGrath (0-6 frees, 0-6 frees); J Hennessy, J McGrath, L Treacy (0-1 each).

13 November 2016 Semi-Final	Carbery Rangers	1-13 - 2-15 (aet)	The Nire	Pairc Ui Rinn
15:30	J Hayes 1-3 (3f), B Shanahan 0-4 (2f), B Hodnett 0-2, J O'Riordan, K MacMahon, K Fitzpatrick, S Hayes 0-1 each.	Report	B Wall 0-6 (5), C Gleeson 0-5, L Lawlor, S Walsh 1-0 each, D Guiry 0-2 (1f), D Guiry, J Mulcahy 0-1 each.

=== Final ===
27 November 2016 Final	Dr Crokes	3-15 - 0-06	The Nire	Mallow GAA Complex
15:30	D Casey 3-1 (1-0 penalty, 0-1 free), K O’Leary 0-4, C Cooper (0-1 free), B Looney 0-2 each, A O’Donovan, J Buckley, E Brosnan, J Kiely, C Brady, S Murphy (0-1 45) 0-1 each.	Report	D Ryan 0-4, L Lawlor 0-2.	Referee: K Murphy (Cork)

== Ulster ==
=== Preliminary round ===
16 October 2016 Preliminary round	Kilcoo	1-08 - 0-09	Scotstown	St Tiernach's Park
	R Johnston 1-0, P Devlin 0-3 (2fs), M Devlin 0-2, Aaron Brannagan, A Morgan and D Kane (f) 0-1 each.	Report	S Carey 0-6 (4f), R Beggan (free), D Morgan and D Hughes 0-1 each.

=== Quarter-finals ===
30 October 2016 Quarter-final	Killyclogher St Mary's	2-10 - 1-08	Erin's Own	Healy Park
	M Bradley 1-3, 2f, J Carlin 1-1, S O'Neill 0-4, 2f, C McCann 0-1, N Donnelly 0-1.	Report	T McCann 0-4f, R McKernan 1-0, K Close 0-2f, M McCann 0-1, P McCann 0-1;

30 October 2016 Quarter-final	Slaughtneil	0-12 - 0-07	Derrygonnelly Harps	Celtic Park
	Paul Bradley (0-5, 4f), Se McGuigan (0-2, 1f), Patsy Bradley (0-1), K McKaigue (0-1); F McEldowney (0-1), C O'Doherty (0-1), B McGuigan (0-1).	Report	G Jones (0-3, 2f); L Jones (0-2, 1f), G McGinley (0-1); R Jones (0-1).

30 October 2016 Quarter-final	Maghery Sean MacDermott's	1-13 - 1-10	Ramor United	Athletic Grounds
	Stefan Forker 0-6 (3f), A Forker 1-1 (f), Seamus Forker 0-3 (2f), N Forker, J Lavery, S Cusack 0-1 each;	Report	C Bradley 0-4 (2f), J Bradley 1-1 (f), J Doyle 0-3, C Maguire, K Mulvaney 0-1 each.

30 October 2016 Quarter-final	Kilcoo	1-12 - 1-06	Glenswilly	Páirc Esler
	D O’Hanlon 1-1 (1-0 pen, 0-1f), P Devlin 0-4fs, R Johnston 0-3, E Branagan, N Kane (‘45’), C Laverty, D Kane 0-1 each.	Report	M Murphy 1-2 (1-0pen), O Crawford 0-2, G McFadden (f), B Farrelly 0-1 each.

=== Semi-finals ===
13 November 2016 Semi-final	Slaughtneil	1-11 - 0-08	Killyclogher St Mary's	Athletic Grounds
15:30	Paul Bradley (0-5, 5f), M McGrath (1-0), C Bradley (0-2), Se McGuigan (0-1), P Cassidy (0-1), Shane McGuigan (0-1, f), R Bradley (0-1).	Report	M Bradley (0-4, 3f), S O’Neill (0-1, f), M Swift (0-1), C McCann (0-1), T Cox (0-1).	Man of the Match: Patsy Bradley

13 November 2016 Semi-final	Kilcoo	4-13 - 0-12	Maghery Sean MacDermott's	Páirc Esler
15:30	C Doherty (2-1); R Johnston (1-3); P Devlin (0-4, 3 frees); JJ McLoughlin (1-0), E Branagan, M Devlin, A Morgan, D Kane (f), Gerard McEvoy (f) (0-1 each)	Report	S Forker (0-4, 2 frees); C Mackle, A Forker (0-2 frees); N Forker, R Lappin, Seamus Forker (f), B Crealey (0-1 each).

=== Final ===
27 November 2016 Final	Kilcoo	0-09 - 0-12	Slaughtneil	Athletic Grounds
15:30	C Doherty 0-3, D O'Hanlon 0-2 (2f), D Branagan, R Johnston, M Devlin 0-1 each, P Devlin 0-1 (f).	Report	Shane McGuigan 0-5 (2f), P Bradley 0-2 (2f), B Rodgers 0-2, C McKaigue, C Bradley, C O'Doherty 0-1 each;	Attendance: 9,125; Referee: Sean Hurson (Tyrone); Man of the Match: Brendan Rogers

== Quarter-final ==
11 December 2016 Quarter-final	Slaughtneil	2-11 - 0-05	St Kiernan's	Tír Chonaill Park
	C Bradley 1-2, S McGuigan 0-4 (3f), P Bradley 0-3f, M McGrath 1-0, P Bradley and C O'Doherty 0-1 each.	Report	A Moyles 0-3f, M O'Donoghue and T Moriarty 0-1 each.	Referee: Rory Hickey (Clare); Man of the Match: Padraig Cassidy

== Semi-finals ==
11 February 2017 Semi-final	Slaughtneil	0-12 - 0-10	St Vincent's	Páirc Esler
14:00	C McKaigue 0-4, C Bradley & S McGuigan (2f) 0-3 each, P Bradley 0-2 (2f).	Report	E Varley 0-5 (2f), G Burke 0-2, D Connolly, SB Carthy & N Mullins 0-1 each.	Referee: P Nallen (Roscommon); Man of the Match: Chrissy McKaigue

11 February 2017 Semi-final	Dr Crokes	2-11 - 0-8	Corofin	Gaelic Grounds
16:00	K O'Leary 0-5, J Kiely & G O'Shea 1-0 each, D Casey 0-2 (2f), C Cooper (1f), T Brosnan, S Murphy (1f) & B Looney 0-1 each.	Report	G Sice 0-2 (2f), J Leonard (1f) & D Wall 0-2 each, I Burke & Michael Farragher 0-1 each.	Referee: C Brannigan (Down)

== Final ==
17 March 2017 Final	Dr Crokes	1-09 - 1-07	Slaughtneil (Derry)	Croke Park
17:00	C Cooper 1-2 (2f), B Looney & D Casey (2f) 0-3, M Burns 0-1.	Report	P Bradley (3f) 0-3, P Cassidy 1-0, C Bradley 0-2, F McEldowney & S McGuigan 0-1	Attendance: 30,930; Referee: Maurice Deegan (Laois)

== Statistics ==
=== Top scorers ===
Overall

Rank	Player	Club	Tally	Total	Matches	Average
1	Niall McNamee	Rhode	1-27	30	4	7.50
2	Daithí Casey	Dr Crokes	4-10	22	5	4.40
3	Paul Baradley	Slaughtneil	0-20	20	6	3.33
4	Neil Douglas	Castlebar Mitchels	1-15	18	2	9.00
5	Colm Cooper	Dr Crokes	2-11	17	5	3.40
6	Ryan Johnston	Kilcoo	2-07	13	4	3.25
6	Christopher Bradley	Slaughtneil	1-10	13	6	2.16
6	John Hayes	Carbery Rangers	2-06	12	2	6.00
6	Jason Leonard	Corofin	1-09	12	3	4.00
6	Shane Carthy	St Vincent's	1-09	12	4	3.00
6	David McGivney	Mullinalaghta St Columba's	0-12	12	3	4.00

In a single game

Rank	Player	Club	Tally	Total	Opposition
1	Niall McNamee	Rhode	1-08	11	Gusserane O'Rahilly's
2	Daithí Casey	Dr. Crokes	3-01	10	The Nire
2	Neil Douglas	Castlebar Mitchels	0-10	10	Corofin
3	Neil Douglas	Castlebar Mitchels	1-05	8	Tourlestrane
3	Niall McNamee	Rhode	0-08	8	Seán O'Mahony's
4	Ceilum Doherty	Kilcoo	2-01	7	Maghery Sean MacDermott's
5	Jason Leonard	Corofin	1-03	6	St Brigid's
5	Shane Carthy	St Vincent's	1-03	6	Mullinalaghta St Columba's
5	John Hayes	Carbery Rangers	1-03	6	Monaleen
5	Colm Cooper	Dr Crokes	1-03	6	Loughmore-Castleiney
5	John Hayes	Carbery Rangers	1-03	6	The Nire
5	Mark Bradley	Killyclogher St Mary's	1-03	6	Erin's Own
5	Ryan Johnston	Kilcoo	1-03	6	Maghery Sean MacDermott's
5	David McGivney	Mullinalaghta St Columba's	0-06	6	St Loman's
5	Niall McNamee	Rhode	0-06	6	St Vincent's
5	Liam McGrath	Loughmore-Castleiney	0-06	6	Dr Crokes
5	Brian Wall	The Nire	0-06	6	Carbery Rangers
5	Shane Carey	Scotstown	0-06	6	Kilcoo
5	Stefan Forker	Maghery Sean MacDermott's	0-06	6	Ramor United
