= 1990–91 All-Ireland Senior Club Football Championship =

Irish Football Championship

- Teams: 33
- Champions: Lavey (1st title); Johnny McGurk (captain)
- Runners-up: Salthill–Knocknacarra; Pat Comer (captain)

The 1990–91 All-Ireland Senior Club Football Championship was the 21st staging of the All-Ireland Senior Club Football Championship since its establishment by the Gaelic Athletic Association in 1970-71.

Baltinglass entered the championship as the defending champions, however, they were beaten by Thomas Davis in the Leinster Club Championship.

On 17 March 1991, Lavey won the championship following a 2–09 to 0–10 defeat of Salthill–Knocknacarra in the All-Ireland final at Croke Park. It remains their only championship title.

== Munster ==
=== First round ===
28 October 1990 First round	Clonmel Commercials	1-08 - 0-07	Milltown Malbay	Clonmel Sportsground
	D O'Keeffe 1-1, J McNamara 0-3, W Peters 0-3, F Kelly 0-1.		M Flynn 0-3, S Burke 0-1, J Cullen 0-1, S Cleary 0-1, M Killeen 0-1.	Referee: J O'Leary (Cork)

11 November 1990 First round	Dungarvan	1-09 - 1-07	St Kieran's	Fraher Field
	M Ferncombe 1-3, P Ferncombe 0-5, P Power 0-1.		J Duggan 1-2, R Woulfe 0-4, D Enright 0-1.	Referee: Paddy Russell (Tipperary)

=== Semi-finals ===
17 November 1990 Semi-final	St Finbarr's	1-11 - 2-09	Clonmel Commercials	Ballinlough Sportsfield
	T Power 1-2, J Allen 0-4, J Keating 0-3, M Slocum 0-2.		F Kelly 0-4, J McNamara 1-0, W Peters 1-0, D O'Shea 0-3, D O'Keeffe 0-2.	Referee: Tommy Sugrue (Kerry)

18 November 1990 Semi-final	Dungarvan	0-05 - 1-06	Dr Crokes	Fraher Field
	M Ferncombe 0-2, P Ferncombe 0-1, E Burke 0-1, P Power 0-1.		M Byrnes 0-4, S O'Shea 1-0, G O'Shea 0-1, A O'Shea 0-1.

=== Final ===
9 December 1990 Final	Dr Crokes	0-08 - 0-08	Clonmel Commercials	Páirc Mac Gearailt
	Pádraig O'Shea 0-2, M Byrnes 0-2, Pat O'Shea 0-1, C O'Doherty 0-1, A O'Shea 0-1, N O'Leary 0-1.		F Kelly 0-3, P Kilkenny 0-2, D O'Keeffe 0-2, C McGrath 0-1.	Referee: R Moloney (Limerick)

16 December 1990 Final replay	Dr Crokes	0-15 - 0-10 (aet)	Clonmel Commercials	Páirc Mac Gearailt
	M Byrnes 0-6, Pat O'Shea 0-2, Pádraig O'Shea 0-2, S O'Shea 0-2, G O'Shea 0-2, M Buckley 0-1.		F Kelly 0-5, D O'Shea 0-2, D O'Keeffe 0-1, W Peters 0-1, J McNamara 0-1.	Referee: R Moloney (Limerick)

== Quarter-final ==
9 December 1990 Quarter-final	Lavey	2-11 - 1-12 (aet)	Tír Chonaill Gaels	Dean McGlinchey Park

== Semi-finals ==
3 March 1991 Semi-final	Dr Crokes	2-06 - 3-09	Salthill–Knocknacarra	Lewis Road

3 March 1991 Semi-final	Lavey	2-06 - 0-10	Thomas Davis	Celtic Park

== Final ==
17 March 1991 Final	Lavey	2-09 - 0-10	Salthill–Knocknacarra	Croke Park

== Statistics ==
=== Miscellaneous ===
- Salthill–Knocknacarra won the Connacht Club Championship title for the first time in their history.
- Thomas Davis won the Leinster Club Championship for the first time in their history.
- Lavey won the Ulster Club Championship for the first time in their history.
