= Pat O'Shea (Gaelic footballer, born 1966) =

Irish Gaelic footballer and manager (born 1966)

Personal information
- Native name: Pádraig Ó Sé (Irish)
- Born: 14 June 1966 (age 60) County Kerry, Ireland

Sport
- Sport: Gaelic football
Club management
- Years: Club
- Dr Crokes
		1	1
Inter-county management
- Years: Team
- 2007–2008: Kerry
Inter-county titles as manager
County	League	Province	All-Ireland
Kerry	1	1	1

Pat O'Shea (born 14 June 1966) is a Gaelic football manager from Killarney in Ireland. He was manager of the Kerry senior football team from 2007 to 2008, and won the 2007 All-Ireland Senior Football Championship with Kerry. He co-authored the book Gaelic Football Training Drills (ISBN 0952389304) by COS Productions.

== Playing career ==
O'Shea played predominantly at corner forward for Dr Crokes and won a Kerry Senior Football Championship in 1991 and 2000 and an All-Ireland Senior Club Football Championship in 1992. He also played hurling with the St Patrick's and Dr Crokes clubs and the Kerry under-21 team.

== Managerial career ==
O'Shea managed the Kerry minor teams in 2002 and 2003.

=== Dr Crokes ===
At club level O'Shea managed Dr Crokes to successive Kerry County Finals in 2005 and 2006. Despite being the manager of Kerry he also continued to coach Dr Crokes in their Senior Club Football Championship, which ultimately ended in defeat in the Final Replay in April 2007.

O'Shea returned to take over the Dr Crokes senior team in 2016 and managed them to victory in the 2016 County Championship Final. On St Patrick's Day 2017, Dr Crokes won their second All Ireland Senior Club Championship, defeating Slaughtneil in the final.

He remained in charge of the Dr Crokes senior team and managed them to two further Kerry Senior Football titles in 2017 and 2018.

=== Kerry ===
O'Shea was appointed to manage the Kerry senior footballers for the 2007 season. He named Dr. Dave Geaney of Castleisland Desmonds and Seán Geaney of An Daingean CLG as selectors. He also announced John Sugrue of Renard as his physical trainer.

Kerry won the All-Ireland that season with a victory over Cork in the final. He also led Kerry to All Ireland final in 2008 where they lost to Tyrone, before stepping down as manager on 16 October 2008.

Sporting positions
Preceded by Jack O'Connor	Kerry Senior Football Manager; 2007–2008	Succeeded by Jack O'Connor
Achievements
Preceded by Jack O'Connor (Kerry)	All-Ireland Senior Football Championship winning manager 2007	Succeeded by Mickey Harte (Tyrone)
