= 2016 Kerry Senior Football Championship =

Kerry SFC
- Season: 2016
- Champions: Dr. Crokes (11th S.F.C. Title)
- Relegated: Milltown/Castlemaine
- Munster SCFC: ???
- All Ireland SCFC: ???
- Winning Captain: Johnny Buckley
- Man of the Match: Colm Cooper
- Matches: ???

The 2016 Kerry Senior Football Championship was the 115th edition of Kerry GAA's premier gaelic football tournament for senior teams in County Kerry, Ireland. The tournament consists of 17 teams (8 club teams and 9 divisional teams), with the winners representing Kerry in the Munster Senior Club Football Championship if they are a club team. If the winners are a divisional team the winners of the Kerry Club Football Championship represent the county.

The championship has a back-door format for the first two rounds before proceeding to a knock-out format. Generally, any team to lose two matches will be knocked out of the championship.

On 16 October 2016, Dr. Crokes won their 16th senior football championship when defeating Kenmare District in the final at Fitzgerald Stadium on a scoreline of 2-16 to 1-12.

South Kerry were the defending champions after they defeated Killarney Legion after extra time and a replay in the 2015 final.

Austin Stacks won the 2016 senior club championship having defeated Dr. Crokes in the final.

Milltown/Castlemaine were relegated on 1 October 2016 when losing the relegation final to Kilcummin. This ended their 5-year stay at senior level while Kilcummin preserved their top flight status which spans 19 season to 1998.

== Format Structure Change ==
This year only 8 club teams are taking part in the championship instead of 11 as in previous years. This leaves a total of 8 clubs and 9 divisional team (17 in total). It was decided that only 8 divisional sides would take part so the 2 lowest ranked divisional sides from the previous 5 years would play off in a qualification match with the winner entering the draw for the 2016 County Championship proper.

Relegation (See below): The club team to be relegated from the Senior County Championship will be the same team to be relegated from the Senior Club Championship (The 8 senior clubs play off against each other in Round 1 of the Club Championship. The 4 losers enter a relegation playoff with the losers entering a relegation final. This loser will be relegated to the I.F.C. for 2017. Should a club reach the final of the County championship they will be exempt from the Relegation process in the Club championship).

The winner of the 2016 I.F.C. will be promoted to the 2017 Senior County and Club Championships.

== Promoted to SFC from IFC in 2015 ==
- None

== Relegated from SFC to IFC in 2015 ==
- Ardfert
- Laune Rangers
- St. Michael's/Foilmore

== Participating teams ==
The teams taking part in the 2016 Kerry Senior Football Championship are:

Team	Team Location	Club/Divisional	Club's Divisional Side
Austin Stacks	Tralee	Club	St. Brendan's
Dingle	Dingle	Club	West Kerry
Dr. Crokes	Killarney	Club	East Kerry
East Kerry	x	Divisional (Firies, Fossa, Glenflesk, Gneevguilla, Listry, Spa)	x
Feale Rangers	x	Divisional (Clounmacon, Duagh, Finuge, Listowel Emmets, Moyvane, St. Senan's)	x
Kenmare District	x	Divisional (Templenoe, Kenmare Shamrocks, Tousist, Kilgarvan)	x
Kerins O'Rahillys	Tralee	Club	St. Brendan's
Killarney Legion	Killarney	Club	East Kerry
Kilcummin	Kilcummin	Club	East Kerry
Mid Kerry	x	Divisional (Beaufort, Cromane, Glenbeigh-Glencar, Keel, Laune Rangers)	x
Milltown/Castlemaine	Milltown	Club	Mid Kerry
Rathmore	Rathmore	Club	East Kerry
Shannon Rangers	x	Divisional (Asdee, Ballydonoghue, Ballyduff, Ballylongford, Beale, Tarbert)	x
South Kerry	x	Divisional (Derrynane, Dromid Pearses, Renard, Skellig Rangers, Sneem, St. Mary's, St. Michael's/Foilmore, Valentia Young Islanders, Waterville)	x
St. Brendan's	x	Divisional (Ardfert, Churchill, John Mitchell's, Na Gaeil, St. Patrick's Blennerville)	x
St. Kieran's	x	Divisional (Ballymacelligott, Brosna, Castleisland Desmonds, Cordal, Currow, Knocknagoshel, Scartaglin)	x
West Kerry	x	Divisional (An Ghaeltacht, Annascaul, Castlegregory, Lispole)	x

== Qualification ==
It had been decided that only 8 of the 9 Divisional Teams would play in the Senior Championship. To decide which team would be excluded, all divisional teams were ranked on their performances in the County Championship over the most recent 5-year period (2011-2015 inclusive). These rankings were based on a win counting for 2 points and a draw counting for 1 point.

The 2 lowest placed sides were St. Brendan's and Shannon Rangers. These sides then met in a qualifier to decide who would make it into the championship proper. The loser of this qualifier will play the lowest ranked team on completion of the 2016 Championship, to decide the 8 group teams for the 2017 Championship, except in the event of more than one team giving a walk over in this year’s Championship. In that case the teams that conceded walkovers would play in the 2017 Championship Qualifier.

25 March 2016
Qualification

St. Brendan's	3-14 - 3-5	Shannon Rangers
	Report

Austin Stack Park

== Group stage ==
=== Round 1 ===
The Qualification winner and the remaining 15 teams play in eight matches. The winners proceed to Round 2A while the losers play in Round 2B.

14 May 2016
Round 1

Austin Stacks	1-16 - 2-8	East Kerry
	Report

Lewis Road

14 May 2016
Round 1

Dr. Crokes	5-19 - 1-9	West Kerry
	Report

Lewis Road

15 May 2016
Round 1

Killarney Legion	5-11 - 0-7	Milltown/Castlemaine
	Report

Killorglin

15 May 2016
Round 1

South Kerry	3-10 - 1-15	Kerins O'Rahilly's
	Report

Austin Stack Park

15 May 2016
Round 1

Mid Kerry	3-12 - 1-13	Kilcummin
	Report

Killorglin

15 May 2016
Round 1

St. Kieran's	1-17 - 1-15	Feale Rangers
	Report

Cordal

15 May 2016
Round 1

Dingle	1-16 - 2-8	Rathmore
	Report

Rathbeg

15 May 2016
Round 1

Kenmare District	1-16 - 1-10	St. Brendan's
	Report

Austin Stack Park

=== Round 2 ===
==== Round 2A ====
The 8 winners from Round 1 play each other in this round. The winners proceed to the quarter-finals while the losers play in Round 3.

21 May 2016
6:30
Round 2A

Dr. Crokes	2-16 - 3-12	St. Kieran's
	Report

Cordal

21 May 2016
6:30
Round 2A

Kenmare District	1-11 - 0-10	Killarney Legion
	Report

Kenmare

22 May 2016
2:30
Round 2A

South Kerry	1-13 - 1-13 (a.e.t.)	Austin Stacks
	Report

Chaerciveen

22 May 2016
3:30
Round 2A

Mid Kerry	3-14 - 2-15	Dingle
	Report

Killorglin

28 May 2016
6:30
Round 2A Replay

South Kerry	2-10 - 0-8	Austin Stacks
	Report

Connolly Park, Tralee

==== Round 2B ====
The 8 losers from Round 1 play each other in this round. The winners proceed to Round 3 while the losers exit the championship.

21 May 2016
4:00
Round 2B

Rathmore	3-14 - 1-16	St. Brendan's
	Report

Austin Stack Park

21 May 2016
5:45
Round 2B

Kerins O'Rahilly's	3-11 - 1-11	Feale Rangers
	Report

Austin Stack Park

21 May 2016
6:30
Round 2B

West Kerry	1-15 - 1-10	Kilcummin
	Report

Kilcummin

22 May 2016
2:00
Round 2B

Milltown/Castlemaine	1-15 - 1-14 (a.e.t.)	East Kerry
	Report

Killorglin

=== Round 3 ===
The four Round 2A losers play the four Round 2B winners in this round. The four winners progress to the quarter-finals while the losers exit the championship.

10 July 2016
5:00pm
Round 3

Dingle	2-13 - 1-11	Milltown/Castlemaine
	Report

Austin Stack Park

10 July 2016
6:45pm
Round 3

Austin Stacks	0-21 - 1-13	West Kerry
	Report

Austin Stack Park

10 July 2016
2:00pm
Round 3

Rathmore	1-18 - 0-20 (a.e.t.)	St. Kieran's
	Report

Fitzgerald Stadium

10 July 2016
3:30pm
Round 3

Kerins O'Rahilly's	3-12 - 2-12	Killarney Legion
	Report

Fitzgerald Stadium

== Knock-Out Stage ==
=== Quarter-finals ===
The 4 Round 2A winners play the 4 Round 3 winners.

1 October 2016
3:00pm
Quarter-Final

Dr. Crokes	1-16 - 0-14	Kerins O'Rahillys
	Report

Austin Stack Park

1 October 2016
4:45pm
Quarter-Final

Dingle	0-12 - 0-11	South Kerry
	Report

Austin Stack Park

2 October 2016
2:00pm
Quarter-Final

Rathmore	1-12 - 0-13	Mid Kerry
	Report

Fitzgerald Stadium

2 October 2016
4:00pm
Quarter-Final

Kenmare District	0-15 - 0-12	Austin Stacks
	Report

Fitzgerald Stadium

=== Semi-finals ===
9 October 2016
2:00pm
Semi-Final

Dr. Crokes	1-15 - 0-15	Dingle
Colm Cooper 0-4 (0-1f), Brian Looney 0-3, Daithí Casey 0-2, Gavin White, Ambrose O’Donovan, Kieran O’Leary, Tony Brosnan, Shane Murphy (0-1f) and Micheál Burns 0-1 each	Report	Conor Geaney 0-5 (0-4f), Paul Geaney 0-3 (0-1f), Tom O’Sullivan and Cathal Bambury 0-2 each, Aidan O’Connor, Michael Geaney (0-1f), Breándan Kelliher 0-1 each

Fitzgerald Stadium
Referee: Sean Joy

9 October 2016
3:30pm
Semi-Final

Kenmare District	0-20 - 0-19	Rathmore
Paul O’Connor 0-7 (0-3f), Adrian Spillane 0-3, Sean O’Shea, Killian Spillane, Patrick Clifford 0-2 each, John Spillane, Tadhg Morley, Peter O’Shea, and Stephen O’Brien 0-1 each	Report	Brendan O’Keeffe 0-7 (0-6f), Shane Ryan and Mark Reen (0-3f) 0-3 each, Paul Murphy and John Moynihan 0-2 each, Aidan O’Mahony and Mark Ryan 0-1 each

Fitzgerald Stadium
Referee: Brendan Griffin

=== Final ===
16 October 2016
3:30 pm
Final

Dr. Crokes	2-16 - 1-12	Kenmare District
Colm Cooper, Brian Looney 0-4, Kieran O’Leary 1-1, Johnny Buckley 1-0, Shane Murphy (0-1 ’45), Ambrose O’Donovan, Jordan Kiely, Micheál Burns 0-1 each	Report	Paul O’Connor 0-8 (0-7f), Teddy Doyle 1-0, Adrian Spillane and Killian Spillane 0-2 each

Fitzgerald Stadium Killarney
Referee: Brendan Grifin

== Relegation ==
The club team to be relegated from the Senior County Championship will be the same team to be relegated from the Senior Club Championship. The 8 senior clubs play off against each other in Round 1 of the Club Championship. The 4 losers enter a relegation playoff with the losers entering a relegation final. This loser will be relegated to the I.F.C. for 2017. Should a club reach the final of the County championship they will be exempt from the Relegation process in the Club championship.

1 October 2016
5:00pm
Relegation Final

Kilcummin	1-15 - 0-15	Milltown/Castlemaine

Castleisland

== Championship statistics ==
=== Miscellaneous ===
- Kenmare District qualify for the final for the first time since 1987.
- Dr Crokes overtake Laune Rangers and John Mitchels to go second in the roll of honor with a 10th title.
- Despite winning the 2015 Intermediate Championship St Mary's Cahersiveen don't move up to senior.
