= 2018 Kerry Senior Football Championship =

Gaelic football competition

2018 Kerry SFC
Tournament details
- County: Kerry
- Year: 2018
- Trophy: Bishop Moynihan Cup
- Sponsor: Garvey's Supervalu
- Date: 25 August - 28 October
- Teams: 17
- Defending champions: Dr. Crokes

Winners
- Champions: Dr. Crokes
- Manager: Pat O'Shea
- Captain: John Payne
- Qualify for: Munster Club SFC

Runners-up
- Runners-up: Dingle
- Manager: Sean Geaney
- Captain: ???

Promotion/Relegation
- Promoted team(s): Kilcummin
- Relegated team(s): An Ghaeltacht

Other
- Player of the Year: Tom O'Sullivan
- Top Scorer: Paul Geaney
- Website: Kerry GAA

The 2018 Kerry Senior Football Championship was the 117th edition of Kerry GAA's premier gaelic football tournament for senior teams in County Kerry, Ireland. The tournament consists of 17 teams (8 club teams and 9 divisional teams), with the winners representing Kerry in the Munster Senior Club Football Championship if they are a club team. If the winners are a divisional team the winners of the Kerry Club Football Championship represent the county.

The championship has a back-door format for the first two rounds before proceeding to a knock-out format. Generally, any team to lose two matches will be knocked out of the championship.

This was An Ghaeltacht's return to the senior ranks, meaning they will no longer provide players to the West Kerry District panel for this season. Kilcummin (who were relegated to the I.F.C. for 2018) will provide the East Kerry Divisional side with players for the S.F.C.

Dr. Crokes were the 2017 champions after they defeated South Kerry in the final.

== Format Structure Change ==
8 club teams and 9 divisional teams (17 in total) will take part in this year's S.F.C. It was decided that only 8 divisional sides would take part in the competition proper so the 2 lowest ranked divisional sides from the previous 5 years would play off in a qualification match with the winner entering the draw for the 2017 County Championship proper.

Relegation (See below): The club team to be relegated from the Senior County Championship will be the same team to be relegated from the Senior Club Championship (The 8 senior clubs play off against each other in Round 1 of the Club Championship. The 4 losers enter a relegation playoff with the losers entering a relegation final. This loser will be relegated to the I.F.C. for 2017. Should a club reach the final of the County championship they will be exempt from the Relegation process in the Club championship).

The winner of the 2017 I.F.C. will be promoted to the 2018 Senior County and Club Championships.

== Team changes ==
=== To Championship ===
Promoted from the Kerry Intermediate Football Championship

- An Ghaeltacht

=== From Championship ===
Relegated to the Kerry Intermediate Football Championship

- Kilcummin

== Participating teams ==
The teams taking part in the 2018 Kerry Senior Football Championship are:

Team	Team Location	Club/Divisional	Club's Divisional Side
An Ghaeltacht	Ballyferriter, Dunquin, Feohanagh, Gallarus & Ventry	Club	West Kerry
Austin Stacks	Tralee	Club	St. Brendan's
Dingle	Dingle	Club	West Kerry
Dr. Crokes	Killarney	Club	East Kerry
East Kerry	x	Divisional (Firies, Fossa, Glenflesk, Gneevguilla, Kilcummin, Listry, Spa)	x
Feale Rangers	x	Divisional (Clounmacon, Duagh, Finuge, Listowel Emmets, Moyvane, St. Senan's)	x
Kenmare District	x	Divisional (Templenoe, Tousist, Kilgarvan)	x
Kenmare Shamrocks	Kenmare	Club	Kenmare District
Kerins O'Rahillys	Tralee	Club	St. Brendan's
Killarney Legion	Killarney	Club	East Kerry
Mid Kerry	x	Divisional (Beaufort, Cromane, Glenbeigh-Glencar, Keel, Laune Rangers, Milltown/Castlemaine)	x
Rathmore	Rathmore	Club	East Kerry
Shannon Rangers	x	Divisional (Asdee, Ballydonoghue, Ballyduff, Ballylongford, Beale, Tarbert)	x
South Kerry	x	Divisional (Derrynane, Dromid Pearses, Renard, Skellig Rangers, Sneem, St. Mary's, St. Michael's/Foilmore, Valentia Young Islanders, Waterville)	x
St. Brendan's	x	Divisional (Ardfert, Churchill, John Mitchell's, Na Gaeil, St. Patrick's Blennerville)	x
St. Kieran's	x	Divisional (Ballymacelligott, Brosna, Castleisland Desmonds, Cordal, Currow, Knocknagoshel, Scartaglin)	x
West Kerry	x	Divisional (Annascaul, Castlegregory, Lispole)	x

== Results ==
=== Preliminary round ===
26 August 2018 Preliminary round	St. Brendan's	0-16 - 1-09	West Kerry	Austin Stack Park
	N Sheehy 0-4, D Griffin 0-2, D O'Callaghan 0-2, I Parker 0-2, P Kearney 0-1, L Mulligan 0-1, D O'Connor 0-1, C Fitzgerald 0-1, I McCarthy 0-1, A O'Donoghue 0-1.		C O'Sullivan 0-5, W Goodwin 1-0, J O'Grady 0-1, B Ryall 0-1, B Hoare 0-1, J Crean 0-1.

=== Round 1 ===
25 August 2018 Round 1	Dr. Crokes	1-18 - 2-13	St. Kieran's	Lewis Road
	C Cooper 0-5, D Shaw 1-0, D Casey 0-3, M Burns 0-3, J Buckley 0-2 G O'Shea 0-1, B Looney 0-1, J Kiely 0-1, P Clarke 0-1, K O'Leary 0-1.		A Barry 0-5, A Breen 1-1, E Horan 1-1, S Horan 0-2, D O'Shea 0-1, S Óg Ó Ciardubháin 0-1, P McCarthy 0-1, D Hickey 0-1.

25 August 2018 Round 1	Mid Kerry	2-14 - 0-10	An Ghaeltacht	Beaufort Grounds
	D O'Sullivan 0-5, D Walsh 1-1, C Kennedy 1-1, L Carey 0-2, F Clifford 0-2, J Brosnan 0-1, G Sayers 0-1, G Horan 0-1.		SM Ó Conchúir 0-3, D Ó Sé 0-3, B Ó Beaglaoich 0-2, É Ó Conchúir 0-1, S Ó Bambaire 0-1.

25 August 2018 Round 1	Killarney Legion	2-14 - 2-12	Rathmore	Bishop Moynihan/Tim Lenihan Park
	J O'Donoghue 1-3, J O'Sullivan 0-5, C Keane 0-4, P Lucey 1-0, Danny Sheahan 0-1, J O'Neill 0-1.		S Ryan 1-8, E Lawlor 1-0, M Reen 0-1, G O'Keeffe 0-1, J Moynihan 0-1, A Darmody 0-1.

25 August 2018 Round 1	South Kerry	1-14 - 0-13	Kenmare Shamrocks	Con Keating Park
	B Sheehan 0-7, N O'Shea 1-1, D Daly 0-2, G O'Sullivan 0-1, D Keating 0-1, Pádraig O'Sullivan 0-1, C Keating 0-1.		S O'Shea 0-7, S O'Sullivan 0-1, D O'Shea 0-1, M McCarthy 0-1, D Hallissey 0-1, K O'Sullivan 0-1, S O'Brien 0-1.

1 September 2018 Round 1	Austin Stacks	2-22 - 0-06	Kenmare District	Connolly Park
	G Horan 1-2, D O'Brien 0-5, F O'Brien 0-5, S O'Callaghan 0-4, K Donaghy 0-1, P McCarthy 0-1, W Guthrie 0-1, C Jordan 0-1, J O'Shea 0-1, M O'Donnell 0-1.		K Spillane 0-3, D Siocrú 0-2, A Spillane 0-1.

1 September 2018 Round 1	Dingle	3-18 - 0-09	Shannon Rangers	Páirc an Aghasaigh
	P Geaney 2-0, T Sheehy 0-5, M Flaherty 1-0, R McCarthy 0-3, M Boyle 0-2, T O'Sullivan 0-2, P Devane 0-2, B O'Connell 0-2, B O'Connell 0-1, B Devane 0-1.		P Kennelly 0-4, M Boyle 0-3, J Goulding 0-2.

1 September 2018 Round 1	Kerins O'Rahilly's	3-15 - 0-16	Feale Rangers	Frank Sheehy Park
	J Savage 0-7, J Ferguson 1-2, D Moran 1-1, G O'Brien 1-0, T Walsh 0-3, BJ Keane 0-1, G Savage 0-1.		C Cox 0-7, M Stack 0-4, E Flaherty 0-2, S Stack 0-1, P Quille 0-1, J Browne 0-1.

1 September 2018 Round 1	East Kerry	4-20 - 2-11	St. Brendan's	Fitzgerald Stadium
	P Clifford 3-4, E Cronin 0-6, D Moynihan 1-0, S O'Leary 0-3, J Sherwood 0-3, K McCarthy 0-2, D Roche 0-1, S McSweeney 0-1.		I Parker 1-6, N Sheehy 1-2, D O'Connor 0-1, D O'Callaghan 0-1, C Fitzgerald 0-1.

=== Round 2A ===
8 September 2018 Round 2A	Killarney Legion	2-13 - 2-09	Mid Kerry	J. P. O'Sullivan Park
	J O'Donoghue 1-6, C Keane 1-3, J O'Sullivan 0-3, J Lyne 0-1.		G Horan 1-1, D O'Sullivan 0-4, C Kennedy 1-0, L Carey 0-2, D Walsh 0-1, N Breen 0-1.	Referee: J Lynch

9 September 2018 Round 2A	Kerins O'Rahilly's	3-18 - 2-17	Dr. Crokes	Fitzgerald Stadium
	T Walsh 2-2, J Savage 0-7, BJ Keane 0-6, K Mullins 1-0, G O'Brien 0-1, R O'Callaghan 0-1, C Coffey 0-1.		D Shaw 1-2, B Looney 1-1, M Burns 0-4, K O'Leary 0-4, C Cooper 0-3, D Casey 0-2, J Buckley 0-1.	Referee: J Griffin

9 September 2018 Round 2A	Austin Stacks	4-07 - 1-15	South Kerry	Con Keating Park
	S O'Callaghan 2-0, K Donaghy 1-1, C Jordan 1-0, D O'Brien 0-2, P McCarthy 0-2, M O'Donnell 0-1, G Horan 0-1.		B Sheehan 0-8, M O'Sullivan 1-0, N O'Shea 0-3, G O'Sullivan 0-1, C O'Shea 0-1, M Griffin 0-1, C Farley 0-1.	Referee: J O'Sullivan

9 September 2018 Round 2A	East Kerry	6-15 - 2-10	Dingle	Fitzgerald Stadium
	D Roche 2-3, D Clifford 2-2, E Cronin 1-2, N Duggan 1-0, K McCarthy 0-3, D Moynihan 0-2, P Clifford 0-2, S O'Leary 0-1.		P Geaney 2-2, T Mac a'tSithigh 0-5, B Ó Conchúir 0-1, M Ó Flaitheartaigh 0-1, T Ó Súilleabháin 0-1.	Referee: P Hayes

=== Round 2B ===
8 September 2018 Round 2B	An Ghaeltacht	2-18 - 0-05	Kenmare District	Gallarus Grounds
	G Mac an tSaoir 1-2, D Ó Sé 0-5, T Ó Sé 1-0, É Ó Conchúir 0-3, SM Ó Conchúir 0-2, PJ Mac an Láimh 0-2, C Ó Muircheartaigh 0-1, R Ó Sé 0-1, B Ó Beaglaoich 0-1, C Ó Coileáin 0-1.		D O'Sullivan 0-3, T Ó Siochrú 0-1, S Sheehan 0-1.	Referee: Donal Casey

8 September 2018 Round 2B	St. Brendan's	6-11 - 0-16	Shannon Rangers	Tarbert Grounds
	D O'Callaghan 2-0, N Sheehy 0-4, S Okunbar 1-0, D O'Connor 1-0, D Griffin 1-0, B O'Regan 1-0, I Parker 0-2, K O'Dwyer 0-1, J Barry 0-1, C Fitzgerald 0-1, A O'Donoghue 0-1, M O'Brien 0-1.		M Boyle 0-6, P Kennelly 0-3, G O'Sullivan 0-2, P Costello 0-1, J Goulding 0-1, M Buckley 0-1, D Sheehy 0-1, K Lanigan 0-1.	Referee: J Dineen

8 September 2018 Round 2B	Rathmore	0-17 - 0-15	Kenmare Shamrocks	Bishop Moynihan/Tim Linehan Park
	S Ryan 0-6, M Reen 0-3, C Spiers 0-2, J Moynihan 0-2, E Lawlor 0-1, B Friel 0-1, D O'Sullivan 0-1, C Murphy 0-1.		S O'Shea 0-8, P O'Connor 0-2, S O'Brien 0-2, S O'Leary 0-1, D Hallissey 0-1, S O'Sullivan 0-1.	Referee: S Mulvihill

9 September 2018 Round 2B	St. Kieran's	1-14 - 1-13	Feale Rangers	Frank Sheehy Park
	S Horan 1-1, P O'Connor 0-4, S Óg Ó Ciardubháin 0-3, A Barry 0-1, S Fitzmaurice 0-1, V Horan 0-1, A Breen 0-1, T Hickey 0-1, P McCarthy 0-1.		C Cox 0-8, D Foran 1-1, P Quille 0-3, P Corridan 0-1.	Referee: T Moriarty

=== Round 3 ===
15 September 2018 Round 3	South Kerry	1-15 - 0-11	Rathmore	J. P. O'Sullivan
	B Sheehan (1-2), G O'Sullivan (0-4), D Daly (0-3), N O'Shea (0-3), J Curran (0-1), C Farley (0-1), J Daly (0-1)	Report	S Ryan (0-6, 5f), M Reen (0-2, 1f), C Spiers (0-2), M Ryan (0-1)	Referee: B Griffin

15 September 2018 Round 3	Dingle	1-14 - 1-11	St. Kieran's	Austin Stack Park
	B O'Sullivan (1-3), T O'Sullivan (0-3), M Geaney (0-3, 1f), T Sheehy (0-3, 1f), A O'Connor (0-2)	Report	P O'Connor (0-4, 3f), A Barry (0-3, 2f), D Hickey (1-0), L Brosnan (0-1), S Scanlon (0-1), V Horan (0-1), S Brosnan (0-1),	Referee: E Walsh

16 September 2018 Round 3	St. Brendan's	3-18 - 1-18	Mid Kerry	Fitzgerald Stadium
	C Kennedy (1-3; 1-0 pen, 1f), F Clifford (0-4, 2f), D O'Sullivan (0-4), M Breen (0-2), G Sayers (Keel, 0-2), J Tyther (0-1), L Carey (0-1), D Walsh (0-1)	Report	I Parker (2-8; 0-5f), D O'Connor (0-2); D O'Callaghan (0-2), K Fitzgerald (1-0), D Griffin (0-1), N Sheehy (0-1f), K O'Dwyer (0-1), S Okunbor (0-1), B Barrett (0-1); J Barry (0-1)	Referee: P O'Sullivan

16 September 2018 Round 3	Dr. Crokes	3-28 - 2-15	An Ghaeltacht	Fitzgerald Stadium
	T Brosnan (1-14; 0-4f), K O’Leary (2-2), D Shaw (0-4), J Buckley (0-2), M Burns (0-2), B Looney (0-2), B Courtney (0-1)	Report	D Ó Sé (0-9; 6f), R Ó Sé (1-1), T Ó Sé (1-1), B Ó Beaglaoich (0-1), É Ó Conchúir (0-1), SM Ó Conchúir (0-1f), C Ó Coileáin (0-1), S Ó Bambaire (0-1)	Referee: S Joy

=== Quarter-finals ===
29 September 2018 Quarter-final	Austin Stacks	0-09 - 3-09	Dingle	Austin Stack Park
	D O'Brien (0-5, 3f), D Casey (0-1), R Shanahan (0-1), S O'Callaghan (0-1), J O'Shea (0-1)	Report	P Geaney (2-3, 2f), T Sullivan (0-3), P Devane (0-2), T Sheehy (0-1f), M Flaherty (1-0)	Referee: P O'Sullivan

29 September 2018 Quarter-final	Kerins O'Rahilly's	3-11 - 1-15	St. Brendan's	Austin Stack Park
	J Savage 0-6, D Moran 1-1, T Walsh 1-1, T Hoare 1-0, BJ Keane 0-1, C Coffey 0-1, K Mullins 0-1.		I Parker 0-7, N Sheehy 1-2, D O'Connor 0-2, D O'Callghan 0-2, B Poff 0-1, A O'Donoghue 0-1.	Referee: E Walsh

30 September 2018 Quarter-final	Killarney Legion	0-09 - 1-20	Dr. Crokes	Fitzgerald Stadium
	J O'Donoghue 0-6 (0-3 frees), B McGuire, Danny Sheahan 0-1, C Keane 0-1		T Brosnan 0-9 (0-4 frees), B Looney 1-2, D Casey 0-2 (2 frees), K O’Leary 0-2, D Shaw 0-2, M Burns 0-1, C Cooper 0-1, J Kiely 0-1	Referee: S Mulvihill

30 September 2018 Quarter-final	East Kerry	4-12 - 2-10	South Kerry	Fitzgerald Stadium
	D Roche 2-3 (1 free), D Clifford 1-4 (3 frees), N Duggan 1-0, D Moynihan 0-2, P Clifford 0-1, E Cronin 0-1, C O’Donoghue 0-1	Report	B Sheehan 1-6 (0-5 frees), C Keating 1-0, N O’Shea 0-1, K Young 0-1, D Daly 0-1, A Walsh 0-1	Referee: J Griffin; Man of the Match: Paudie Clifford

=== Semi-finals ===
14 October 2018 Semi-final	East Kerry	2-10 - 1-13	Dingle	Austin Stack Park
2:00 pm	D Clifford 2-4 (0-1f), D Roche 0-2 (1f), J Sherwood 0-1, P Casey 0-1, P Clifford 0-1 ’45′, L Kearney 0-1	Report	P Geaney 0-6 (5f), T O’Sullivan 1-1, T Sheehy 0-2, M Geaney 0-2, M Flannery 0-1, B O’Sullivan 0-1	Referee: S Joy

14 October 2018 Semi-final	Kerins O'Rahilly's	2-10 - 2-19	Dr. Crokes	Austin Stack Park
3:45 pm	G O’Brien 2-1, J Savage 0-3f, BJ Keane 0-2, D Moran 0-2 (1 ’45′), K Mullins 0-1, T Walsh 0-1	Report	T Brosnan 0-6 (0-3f), J Kiely 2-0, K O’Leary 0-5, J Buckley 0-2, M Burns 0-2, D Shaw 0-2, S Murphy 0-1 ’45′, B Looney 0-1	Referee: B Griffin

21 October 2018 Semi-final replay	East Kerry	0-12 - 4-13	Dingle	Austin Stack Park
3:00 pm	D Clifford 0-3 (2f), P Clifford 0-3 (1f), D Moynihan 0-2 (1f), D Roche 0-2, C O’Donoghue 0-1, J O’Donoghue 0-1 ’45′	Report	P Geaney 3-1 (1-0 pen), T O’Sullivan 0-5, M Geaney 1-2 (0-1f), T Sheehy 0-1f, G Curran 0-1 ’45′, B O’Sullivan 0-1, P O’Connor 0-1, N Geaney 0-1	Referee: P Hayes

=== Final ===
28 October 2018 Final	Dr. Crokes	1-15 - 0-12	Dingle	Austin Stack Park
3:00pm	D Shaw 0-4, D Casey 0-4 (0-3f), G White 1-1, T Brosnan 0-2, J Buckley 0-1, G O’Shea 0-1, B Looney 0-1, J Kiely 0-1	Report	P Geaney 0-6 (0-5f), T O’Sullivan 0-2, T Sheehy 0-1, M Geaney 0-1, M Flaherty 0-1, B O’Sullivan 0-1	Referee: S Mulvihill

== Relegation ==
The club team to be relegated from the Senior County Championship will be the same team to be relegated from the Senior Club Championship. The 8 senior clubs play off against each other in Round 1 of the Club Championship. The 4 losers enter a relegation playoff with the losers entering a relegation final. This loser will be relegated to the I.F.C. for 2019. Should a club reach the final of the County championship they will be exempt from the Relegation process in the Club championship.

29 September 2018
Relegation Final

An Ghaeltacht	2-7 - 0-18	Kenmare Shamrocks

J.P. O'Sullivan Park, Killorglin
Referee: Billy O'Shea

== Championship statistics ==
=== Top scorers ===
Overall

Rank	Player	Club	Tally	Total	Matches	Average
1	Paul Geaney	Dingle	9-18	45	6	7.50
2	Ivan Parker	St. Brendan's	3-25	34	5	6.80
2	Tony Brosnan	Dr. Crokes	1-31	34	4	8.50
4	Bryan Sheehan	South Kerry	2-23	29	4	7.25
5	David Clifford	East Kerry	5-13	28	4	7.00
6	Darragh Roche	East Kerry	4-11	23	5	4.60
6	Shane Ryan	Rathmore	1-20	23	3	7.66
6	Jack Savage	Kerins O'Rahilly's	0-23	23	4	5.75
9	James O'Donoghue	Killarney Legion	2-15	21	3	7.00
10	Paudie Clifford	East Kerry	3-11	20	5	4.00
10	David Shaw	Dr. Crokes	2-14	20	6	3.66
10	Kieran O'Leary	Dr. Crokes	2-14	20	6	3.66

In a single game

Rank	Player	Club	Tally	Total	Opposition
1	Tony Brosnan	Dr. Crokes	1-14	17	An Ghaeltacht
2	Ivan Parker	St. Brendan's	2-08	14	Mid Kerry
3	Paudie Clifford	East Kerry	3-04	13	St. Brendan's
4	Shane Ryan	Rathmore	1-08	11	Killarney Legion
5	Paul Geaney	Dingle	3-01	10	East Kerry
5	David Clifford	East Kerry	2-04	10	Dingle
7	Darragh Roche	East Kerry	2-03	9	Dingle
7	Paul Geaney	Dingle	2-03	9	Austin Stacks
7	Darragh Roche	East Kerry	2-03	9	South Kerry
7	Ivan Parker	St. Brendan's	1-06	9	East Kerry
7	James O'Donoghue	Killarney Legion	1-06	9	Mid Kerry
7	Bryan Sheehan	South Kerry	1-06	9	East Kerry
7	Tony Brosnan	Dr. Crokes	0-09	9	Killarney Legion
7	Dara Ó Sé	An Ghaeltacht	0-09	9	Dr. Crokes

=== Miscellaneous ===
- Colm Cooper and Eoin Brosnan win a record 8th SFC medal.
- Dr. Crokes overtook Austin Stacks to go top of the roll of honour for the first time with a 13th title.
- Dr. Crokes set a new record of seven titles in a single decade.
- An Ghaeltacht returned to the senior championship for the first time since 2009.
