= 2017 Kerry Senior Football Championship =

Gaelic football competition

2017 Kerry SFC
Tournament details
- County: Kerry
- Year: 2017
- Trophy: Bishop Moynihan Cup
- Sponsor: Garvey's Supervalu
- Date: 6 May - 22 October
- Teams: 17
- Defending champions: Dr. Crokes

Winners
- Champions: Dr. Crokes (12th win)
- Manager: Pat O'Shea
- Captain: Daithi Casey
- Qualify for: Munster Club SFC

Runners-up
- Runners-up: South Kerry
- Manager: William Harmon
- Captain: Bryan Sheehan

Promotion/Relegation
- Relegated team(s): Kilcummin

Other
- Website: Kerry GAA

The 2017 Kerry Senior Football Championship was the 116th edition of Kerry GAA's premier gaelic football tournament for senior teams in County Kerry, Ireland. The tournament consists of 17 teams (8 club teams and 9 divisional teams), with the winners representing Kerry in the Munster Senior Club Football Championship if they are a club team. If the winners are a divisional team, the winners of the Kerry Club Football Championship represent the county.

The championship has a back-door format for the first two rounds before proceeding to a knock-out format. Generally, any team to lose two matches will be knocked out of the championship.

This was Kenmare Shamrocks return to the senior ranks, meaning they will no longer provide players to the Kenmare District panel for this season. Milltown/Castlemaine (who were relegated to the I.F.C. for 2017) will provide the Mid-Kerry Divisional side with players for the S.F.C.

Dr. Crokes were the defending champions after they defeated Kenmare District in the 2016 final.

Dr. Crokes won the 2017 senior club championship having defeated Kenmare Shamrocks 3-20 to 2-20 in the final in Fitzgerald Stadium after extra time on 10 September 2017.

Kilcummin were relegated to the 2018 I.F.C. after losing to Kerin's O'Rahillys in the Senior Club Championship Relegation Playoff. This ended their 20 year tenure as a senior club after claiming the 1997 Kerry I.F.C. title. This period involved a County final appearance in 2002 as well as Munster S.C.F.C. semi-final appearance in 2007.

== Format Structure Change ==
8 club teams and 9 divisional teams (17 in total) will take part in this year's S.F.C. It was decided that only 8 divisional sides would take part in the competition proper so the 2 lowest ranked divisional sides from the previous 5 years would play off in a qualification match with the winner entering the draw for the 2017 County Championship proper.

Relegation (See below): The club team to be relegated from the Senior County Championship will be the same team to be relegated from the Senior Club Championship (The 8 senior clubs play off against each other in Round 1 of the Club Championship. The 4 losers enter a relegation playoff with the losers entering a relegation final. This loser will be relegated to the I.F.C. for 2017. Should a club reach the final of the County championship they will be exempt from the Relegation process in the Club championship).

The winner of the 2017 I.F.C. will be promoted to the 2018 Senior County and Club Championships.

== Team changes ==
The following teams have changed division since the 2016 championship season.

=== To S.F.C. ===
Promoted from 2016 Kerry Intermediate Football Championship

- Kenmare Shamrocks - (Intermediate Champions)

=== From S.F.C. ===
Relegated to 2017 Kerry I.F.C.

- Milltown/Castlemaine

== Participating teams ==
The teams taking part in the 2017 Kerry Senior Football Championship are:

Team	Team Location	Club/Divisional	Club's Divisional Side
Austin Stacks	Tralee	Club	St. Brendan's
Dingle	Dingle	Club	West Kerry
Dr. Crokes	Killarney	Club	East Kerry
East Kerry	x	Divisional (Firies, Fossa, Glenflesk, Gneevguilla, Listry, Spa)	x
Feale Rangers	x	Divisional (Clounmacon, Duagh, Finuge, Listowel Emmets, Moyvane, St. Senan's)	x
Kenmare District	x	Divisional (Templenoe, Tousist, Kilgarvan)	x
Kenmare Shamrocks	Kenmare	Club	Kenmare District
Kerins O'Rahillys	Tralee	Club	St. Brendan's
Killarney Legion	Killarney	Club	East Kerry
Kilcummin	Kilcummin	Club	East Kerry
Mid Kerry	x	Divisional (Beaufort, Cromane, Glenbeigh-Glencar, Keel, Laune Rangers, Milltown/Castlemaine)	x
Rathmore	Rathmore	Club	East Kerry
Shannon Rangers	x	Divisional (Asdee, Ballydonoghue, Ballyduff, Ballylongford, Beale, Tarbert)	x
South Kerry	x	Divisional (Derrynane, Dromid Pearses, Renard, Skellig Rangers, Sneem, St. Mary's, St. Michael's/Foilmore, Valentia Young Islanders, Waterville)	x
St. Brendan's	x	Divisional (Ardfert, Churchill, John Mitchell's, Na Gaeil, St. Patrick's Blennerville)	x
St. Kieran's	x	Divisional (Ballymacelligott, Brosna, Castleisland Desmonds, Cordal, Currow, Knocknagoshel, Scartaglin)	x
West Kerry	x	Divisional (An Ghaeltacht, Annascaul, Castlegregory, Lispole)	x

== Qualification ==
It was decided that only 8 of the 9 Divisional Teams would play in the Senior Championship. To determine which team would be excluded, all divisional teams were ranked on their performances in the County Championship over the most recent 5-year period (2012-2016 inclusive). These rankings were based on a win counting for 2 points and a draw counting for 1 point.

The 2 lowest placed sides were (as was the case in 2016) St. Brendan's and Shannon Rangers. These sides then meet in a qualifier to decide who would make it into the championship proper. The loser of this qualifier will play the lowest ranked team on completion of the 2017 Championship, to decide the 8 group teams for the 2018 Championship, except in the event of more than one team giving a walk over in this year’s Championship. In that case the teams that conceded walk-overs play in 2018 Championship Qualifier.

6 May 2017
6:30
Qualification

St. Brendan's	6-24 - 1-8	Shannon Rangers
	Report

Austin Stack Park

== Rounds 1 to 3 ==
=== Round 1 ===
The Qualification winner and the remaining 15 teams play in eight matches. The winners proceed to Round 2A while the losers play in Round 2B.

13 May 2017; 6:30; Round 1	Austin Stacks	0-16 - 1-13 (a.e.t.)	St. Kieran's	Connolly Park; Referee: Padraig O'Sullivan (Firies); Man of the Match: Kieran Donaghy
13 May 2017; 6:30; Round 1	David Mannix 0-10 (0-7f), Greg Horan and Michael O'Donnell 0-2 each, Shane O'Callaghan and Jack Morgan 0-1 each	Report	Vinny Horan 1-0, James Walsh (0-2f) and Thomas Hickey 0-3 each, Phillip O'Connor 0-2f, Eamon Kiely, Seamus Scanlon, Daniel Murphy, Adam Barry, Tom McGoldrick 0-1 each	Connolly Park; Referee: Padraig O'Sullivan (Firies); Man of the Match: Kieran Donaghy

13 May 2017; 6:30; Round 1	St. Brendan's	2-17 - 2-14	Kilcummin	Blennerville; Referee: Jonathan Griffin (Glenbeigh); Man of the Match: Ivan Parker (Churchill)
13 May 2017; 6:30; Round 1	Ivan Parker 1-5 (0-1f), Alan O'Donoghue 0-5 (0-3f), Diarmuid Herlihy 1-1, Liam O'Sullivan 0-3 (1 '45), Michael Griffin, Brandon Barrett, Paul McMahon 0-1 each	Report	Kevin McCarthy 0-5 (0-4f), Matthew Keane 1-2 (1 '45), Daniel Moynihan 1-0, Philip Casey 0-3 (0-1f), Brendan Kelay (1 '45), Shane McSweeney, Noel Duggan, Kelvin Teahen 0-1 each	Blennerville; Referee: Jonathan Griffin (Glenbeigh); Man of the Match: Ivan Parker (Churchill)

13 May 2017; 6:30; Round 1	Kenmare District	2-4 - 3-16	Dingle	Templenoe; Referee: Eddie Walsh (Rathmore); Man of the Match: Conor Geaney
13 May 2017; 6:30; Round 1	Killian Spillane 1-2 (0-2f), Pat Spillane Jr 1-0		Paul Geaney 2-4 (0-2f), Conor Geaney 1-2, Tomas Sheehy 0-3, Mikey Geaney 0-2, Matthew Flaherty and Cathal Bambury 0-1 each	Templenoe; Referee: Eddie Walsh (Rathmore); Man of the Match: Conor Geaney

14 May 2017; 1:30; Round 1	Killarney Legion	0-15 - 1-12 (a.e.t.)	Kenmare Shamrocks	Direen; Referee: Paul Hayes (Kerins O'Rahillys); Man of the Match: Billy McGuire
14 May 2017; 1:30; Round 1	Jamie O'Sullivan 0-5 (0-3f, 1 '45), James O'Donoghue 0-4 (0-2f), Conor Keane 0-3 (0-2f), Jonathan Lyne, Cian Gammel, Finbarr Murphy 0-1 each	Report	Sean O'Shea 0-7 (0-6f), Kevin Price 1-0, Shane O'Sullivan, Kevin O'Sullivan, Stephen O'Brien, Paul O'Connor, Michael McCarthy 0-1 each	Direen; Referee: Paul Hayes (Kerins O'Rahillys); Man of the Match: Billy McGuire

14 May 2017; 2:00; Round 1	Rathmore	1-12 - 1-10	East Kerry	Fitzgerald Stadium; Referee: Seamus Mulvihill (St Senans); Man of the Match: Dara Roche (Glenflesk)
14 May 2017; 2:00; Round 1	Shane Ryan 0-7 (0-5f), George O'Keefe 1-1, Mark Reen 0-3f, Michael J Kelliher 0-1	Report	Dara Roche 1-6 (0-2f), Paudie Clifford 0-1f, Padraig De Brún, Ronan Buckley, Jeff O'Donoghue 0-1 each	Fitzgerald Stadium; Referee: Seamus Mulvihill (St Senans); Man of the Match: Dara Roche (Glenflesk)

14 May 2017; 2:30; Round 1	Kerins O'Rahilly's	2-16 - 2-12	South Kerry	Strand Road; Referee: Donal Casey (Scartaglin); Man of the Match: Cormac Coffey
14 May 2017; 2:30; Round 1	Barry John Keane 0-7 (0-2f), John Ferguson 1-2, Gearoid Savage 1-1, Jack Savage 0-3 (0-1f), Padraig Griffin, Cormac Coffey, Karl Mullins	Report	Daniel Daly 1-5 (0-2f), Paul O'Donoghue 0-5 (0-1f), Brendan O'Sullivan 1-0, Denis Daly and Niall O'Shea 0-1 each	Strand Road; Referee: Donal Casey (Scartaglin); Man of the Match: Cormac Coffey

14 May 2017; 2:30; Round 1	West Kerry	0-12 - 1-13	Feale Rangers	Gallarus; Referee: Sean Joy (Laune Rangers); Man of the Match: Conor Cox (Emmets)
14 May 2017; 2:30; Round 1	Dara O Se 0-4, Sean M O Conchuir 0-3f, Jason Hickson 0-2, Cian O Murchu, Donncha Higgins, Declan O'Sullivan 0-1 each	Report	Conor Cox 0-7 (0-4f), Padraig Quille 1-2, Anthony Maher, David Foran, Eoin O'Connell, Bryan Sweeney 0-1 each	Gallarus; Referee: Sean Joy (Laune Rangers); Man of the Match: Conor Cox (Emmets)

14 May 2017; 3:45; Round 1	Dr. Crokes	2-14 - 0-9	Mid Kerry	Fitzgerald Stadium; Referee: Jonathon Griffin (Clounmacon); Man of the Match: Colm Cooper
14 May 2017; 3:45; Round 1	Colm Cooper 1-4 (0-3f), Kieran O'Leary 1-0, Daithi Casey (0-1f) and Jordan Kiely 0-2 each, Shane Murphy (1 '45), Gavin White, David O'Leary, Alan O'Sullivan, Chris Brady, Paul Clarke 0-1 each	Report	Liam Carey 0-4, Gavan O'Grady 0-3 (0-2f), Mike Breen and Donnchadh Walsh 0-1 each	Fitzgerald Stadium; Referee: Jonathon Griffin (Clounmacon); Man of the Match: Colm Cooper

20 May 2017; 6:30; Round 1 Replay	Austin Stacks	0-14 - 1-9	St. Kieran's	Scartaglin; Referee: James O'Sullivan (Firies); Man of the Match: Michael O'Donnell
20 May 2017; 6:30; Round 1 Replay	David Mannix 0-6 (0-2f), Michael O'Donnell 0-4, Pa McCarthy and Shane O'Callaghan 0-2 each	Report	Philip O'Connor 1-3 (0-2f), James Walsh (0-2f) and Tomás Lynch 0-2 each, Seán Óg Ó Ciardubháin (1 '45) and Seamus Scanlon 0-1 each	Scartaglin; Referee: James O'Sullivan (Firies); Man of the Match: Michael O'Donnell

21 May 2017; 2:30; Round 1 Replay	Killarney Legion	2-13 - 1-15	Kenmare Shamrocks	Kenmare; Referee: Billy O'Shea (Keel); Man of the Match: Billy McGuire
21 May 2017; 2:30; Round 1 Replay	James O'Donoghue 0-9 (0-5f), Jamie O'Sullivan 2-0, Billy McGuire 0-2, Conor Keane and Finbarr Murphy 0-1 each	Report	Sean O'Shea 0-6 (0-4f), Paul O'Connor 0-3, Brian O'Sullivan 1-0, Michael McCarthy 0-2, Dara O'Shea, Kevin O'Sullivan, David Hallissey 0-1 each	Kenmare; Referee: Billy O'Shea (Keel); Man of the Match: Billy McGuire

=== Round 2 ===
==== Round 2A ====
The 8 winners from Round 1 play each other in this round. The winners proceed to the quarter-finals while the losers play in Round 3.

20 May 2017; 6:30; Round 2A	Dr. Crokes	7-17 - 0-16	St. Brendan's	Lewis Road, Killarney; Referee: Peter Lyons (Cromane); Man of the Match: Ivan Parker
20 May 2017; 6:30; Round 2A	Colm Cooper 2-4 (0-2f), Daithi Casey 2-3 (1-0 pen, 0-1f), Kieran O'Leary 2-3, Gavin White 1-1, Shane Murphy (1 '45), Fionn Fitzgerald, Alan O'Sullivan, Gavin O'Shea, Brian Looney, Jordan Kiely 0-1 each	Report	Ivan Parker 0-8 (0-1f), David O'Callaghan 0-3 (0-2f), Jack Barry and Cillian Fitzgerald 0-2 each, Alan O'Donoghue 0-1	Lewis Road, Killarney; Referee: Peter Lyons (Cromane); Man of the Match: Ivan Parker

20 May 2017; 6:30; Round 2A	Rathmore	2-16 - 2-7	Feale Rangers	Rathmore; Referee: Jonathon Griffin (Glenbeigh/Glencar); Man of the Match: Conor O'Sullivan
20 May 2017; 6:30; Round 2A	Mark Reen 1-4 (0-2f), Shane Ryan 0-5f, George O'Keefe 1-0, Conor O'Sullivan and Donal O'Sullivan 0-2 each, Mark Ryan, Eoin Lawlor, John Moynihan 0-1 each	Report	Conor Cox 0-7f, Padraig Quille and Bryan Sweeney 1-0 each	Rathmore; Referee: Jonathon Griffin (Glenbeigh/Glencar); Man of the Match: Conor O'Sullivan

21 May 2017; 6:30; Round 2A	Kerins O'Rahilly's	2-13 - 3-9	Dingle	Dingle; Referee: Padraig O'Sullivan (Firies); Man of the Match: David Moran
21 May 2017; 6:30; Round 2A	Barry John Keane 0-6 (0-3f), Gearoid Savage 1-1, John Ferguson 1-0, David Moran 0-3 (1 '45), Cian Sayers, Con Barrett, Jack Savage 0-1 each	Report	Paul Geaney 2-2, Conor Geaney 1-2 (0-1f), Matthew Flaherty and Michael Geaney (0-2f) 0-2 each, Barry O'Sullivan 0-1	Dingle; Referee: Padraig O'Sullivan (Firies); Man of the Match: David Moran

26 May 2017; 6:30; Round 2A	Austin Stacks	4-13 - 3-6	Killarney Legion	Connolly Park, Tralee; Referee: Paul O'Sullivan (Dromid); Man of the Match: David Mannix
26 May 2017; 6:30; Round 2A	David Mannix 0-7 (0-2f), Wayne Guthrie, Greg Horan, Michael O'Donnell (0-1f) 1-1 each, Jack Morgan 1-0, Jack O'Shea, Denis McElligott, Shane O'Callaghan 0-1 each	Report	James O'Donoghue 1-4 (1-0 pen, 0-1f), Conor Keane 1-2 (0-2f), Jamie O'Sullivan 1-0	Connolly Park, Tralee; Referee: Paul O'Sullivan (Dromid); Man of the Match: David Mannix

==== Round 2B ====
The 8 losers from Round 1 play each other in this round. The winners proceed to Round 3 while the losers exit the championship.

21 May 2017; 2:00; Round 2B	South Kerry	2-17 - 1-5	Kilcummin	Lewis Road, Killarney; Referee: Denis Sayers (Austin Stacks); Man of the Match: Paul O'Donoghue
21 May 2017; 2:00; Round 2B	Bryan Sheehan 1-4 (0-1f, 1 '45), Niall O'Shea 1-2, Paul O'Donoghue, Barry Dwyer, Daniel Daly 0-3 each, Conor O'Shea and Dylan Donoghue 0-1 each,	Report	Paul O'Riordan 1-0, Philip Casey 0-2 (0-1f), Shane McSweeney, Noel Duggan, Kevin McCarthy (0-1f) 0-1 each	Lewis Road, Killarney; Referee: Denis Sayers (Austin Stacks); Man of the Match: Paul O'Donoghue

21 May 2017; 3:45; Round 2B	East Kerry	4-15 - 1-11	Mid Kerry	Lewis Road, Killarney; Referee: Paul Hayes (Kerins O'Rahillys); Man of the Match: Dara Roche (Glenflesk)
21 May 2017; 3:45; Round 2B	Dara Roche 2-3 (0-1f), Jeff O'Donoghue 1-3, Ronan Buckley 0-4 (0-2f), David Clifford 1-0, Stephen Foley, Shane Cronin, Jack Sherwood, Paudie Clifford, Mike McCarthy 0-1 each	Report	Gavan O'Grady 0-4 (0-2f), John Tyther 1-0, Liam Carey (0-2f) and Donnchadh Walsh (0-1f) 0-2 each, Mike Breen, Gary Sayers, Cathal Moriarty 0-1 each	Lewis Road, Killarney; Referee: Paul Hayes (Kerins O'Rahillys); Man of the Match: Dara Roche (Glenflesk)

26 May 2017; 6:30; Round 2B	Kenmare Shamrocks	3-13 - 3-8	Kenmare District	Templenoe; Referee: Tom Moriarty (Legion); Man of the Match: Sean O'Shea
26 May 2017; 6:30; Round 2B	Sean O'Shea 1-5 (0-3f), Paul O'Connor 1-4, Shane O'Sullivan 1-0, Stephen O'Brien 0-2, Sean O'Leary and Dara O'Shea 0-1 each	Report	Killian Spillane 1-3 (0-2f), Adrian Spillane 1-1, Teddy Doyle 1-0, Pat Spillane Jr 0-2, Patrick O'Shea and Danny Cahalane 0-1 each	Templenoe; Referee: Tom Moriarty (Legion); Man of the Match: Sean O'Shea

26 May 2017; 6:30; Round 2B	West Kerry	0-14 - 0-13	St. Kieran's	Gallarus; Referee: Mike Henessy (Ballyduff); Man of the Match: Roibéard Ó Sé (An Ghaeltacht)
26 May 2017; 6:30; Round 2B	Dara Ó Sé 0-6 (0-4f), PJ Mac Lámh 0-3, Declan O'Sullivan and Sean Michael Ó Conchuir 0-2 each, Jason Hickson 0-1		James Walsh (0-5f) and Philip O'Connor (0-3f) 0-5 each, Eamon Kiely, Adam Barry, Mike Finnegan 0-1 each	Gallarus; Referee: Mike Henessy (Ballyduff); Man of the Match: Roibéard Ó Sé (An Ghaeltacht)

=== Round 3 ===
The four Round 2A losers play the four Round 2B winners in this round. The four winners progress to the quarter-finals while the losers exit the championship.

8 July 2017; 19:15; Round 3	East Kerry	3-24 - 4-18 (a.e.t.)	St. Brendan's	Austin Stack Park; Referee: Tom McCarthy (Castleisland); Man of the Match: Jack Sherwood (Firies)
8 July 2017; 19:15; Round 3	Jack Sherwood 1-5, Dara Roche 0-6 (0-3f), Jeff O’Donoghue 0-5 (1 '45), Ronan Buckley 0-3, Fintan Coffey and David Clifford 1-0 each, Evan Cronin 0-2, Kieran Murphy, Brian O’Donoghue, Anthony Kennedy 0-1 each	Report	Shane O’Connor 2-4, David O’Callaghan (0-1f) and Ivan Parker (0-1f) 1-4 each, Kevin Shanahan 0-2, Michael Griffin, David Griffin, Brendan Poff, George Bastable 0-1 each	Austin Stack Park; Referee: Tom McCarthy (Castleisland); Man of the Match: Jack Sherwood (Firies)

9 July 2017; 14:00; Round 3	Kenmare Shamrocks	0-17 - 0-12	Feale Rangers	Fitzgerald Stadium; Referee: Edmund Walsh (Rathmore); Man of the Match: Sean O'Shea
9 July 2017; 14:00; Round 3	Sean O'Shea 0-7 (0-4f), Paul O'Connor 0-3, Mark Crowley 0-2, Sean O'Leary, Shane O'Sullivan, Dara O'Shea, Stephen O'Brien, Kevin O'Sullivan 0-1 each	Report	Conor Cox 0-9 (0-7f), Anthony Maher 0-2, Kieran Quirke 0-1	Fitzgerald Stadium; Referee: Edmund Walsh (Rathmore); Man of the Match: Sean O'Shea

9 July 2017; 14:00; Round 3	West Kerry	1-18 - 0-18 (a.e.t.)	Killarney Legion	Austin Stack Park; Referee: Brendan Griffin (Clounmacon); Man of the Match: Dara Ó Sé (An Ghaeltacht)
9 July 2017; 14:00; Round 3	Dara Ó Sé 1-5 (0-1f), Sean Micheál Ó Conchúir 0-3 (0-2f), Padraig Óg Ó Sé, Tomás Ó Sé, Eánna Ó Conchúir 0-2 each, Colm Ó Muirceartaigh, PJ Mac Lámh, James Crean, Declan O’Sullivan 0-1 each		Conor Keane 0-8 (0-1f), Jamie O’Sullivan and James O’Donoghue (0-3f) 0-4 each, Shaun Keane and Conor Culloty 0-1 each	Austin Stack Park; Referee: Brendan Griffin (Clounmacon); Man of the Match: Dara Ó Sé (An Ghaeltacht)

9 July 2017; 15:45; Round 3	South Kerry	1-13 - 0-10	Dingle	Austin Stack Park; Referee: Sean Joy (Laune Rangers); Man of the Match: Killian Young (Renard)
9 July 2017; 15:45; Round 3	Ronan Hussey 1-5 (1-0 pen, 0-3f), Paul O’Donoghue 0-3 (0-1f, 1 '45), Ian Galvin 0-2, Killian Young, Bryan Sheehan, Graham O’Sullivan 0-1 each	Report	Paul Geaney 0-5 (0-4f), Darragh O’Sullivan 0-2, Breandan Kelliher, Michael Geaney (0-1f), Cathal Bambury 0-1 each	Austin Stack Park; Referee: Sean Joy (Laune Rangers); Man of the Match: Killian Young (Renard)

== Knock-Out Stage ==
=== Quarter-finals ===
23 September 2017; 4:00pm Quarter-Final	Kerins O'Rahillys	3-12 - 1-6	East Kerry	Austin Stack Park; Referee: Jonathan Griffin (Glenbeigh-Glencar); Man of the Match: David Moran and Tommy Walsh
23 September 2017; 4:00pm Quarter-Final	Barry John Keane 0-6 (0-4f), David Moran, Tommy Walsh, Gavin O'Brien 1-1 each, Jack Savage 0-2, John Ferguson 0-1	Report	Jack Sherwood 1-0, Dara Roche 0-2 (0-1f), Ronan Buckley, David Clifford (0-1f), Paudie Clifford, Jeff O'Donoghue 0-1 each	Austin Stack Park; Referee: Jonathan Griffin (Glenbeigh-Glencar); Man of the Match: David Moran and Tommy Walsh

23 September 2017; 5:45pm Quarter-Final	West Kerry	1-17 - 0-14	Austin Stacks	Austin Stack Park; Referee: James O'Sullivan (Firies); Man of the Match: Eánna Ó Conchúir (An Ghaeltacht)
23 September 2017; 5:45pm Quarter-Final	Sean Micheál Ó Conchúir 0-5 (0-2f), Dara Ó Sé 0-4 (0-3f), Eánna Ó Conchúir 1-1, Brian Ó Beaglaoich 0-2, PJ Mac Lámh, Jason Hickson, Tomás Ó Sé, Alan Fitzgerald, Declan O'Sullivan 0-1 each	Report	David Mannix 0-8 (0-7f), Darragh O'Brien 0-3, Greg Horan, Kieran Donaghy, Wayne Guthrie 0-1 each	Austin Stack Park; Referee: James O'Sullivan (Firies); Man of the Match: Eánna Ó Conchúir (An Ghaeltacht)

24 September 2017; 1:30pm Quarter-Final	Dr. Crokes	0-17 - 0-12	Kenmare Shamrocks	Fitzgerald Stadium; Referee: Padraig O'Sullivan (Firies); Man of the Match: Micheál Burns
24 September 2017; 1:30pm Quarter-Final	Micheál Burns 0-4, Colm Cooper 0-3 (0-2f), Daithi Casey (0-1f) and Tony Brosnan 0-2, Shane Murphy (1 '45), Johnny Buckley, Gavin O'Shea, Kieran O'Leary, Ambrose O'Donovan, Paul Clarke 0-1 each	av av	Sean O'Shea 0-6 (0-5f), Sean O'Leary, Mark Crowley, Kevin O'Sullivan, Paul O'Connor, Stephen O'Brien, Brian O'Sullivan 0-1 each	Fitzgerald Stadium; Referee: Padraig O'Sullivan (Firies); Man of the Match: Micheál Burns

24 September 2017; 3:15pm Quarter-Final	South Kerry	0-15 - 0-12	Rathmore	Fitzgerald Stadium; Referee: Paul Hayes (Kerins O'Rahillys); Man of the Match: Robert Wharton (Renard)
24 September 2017; 3:15pm Quarter-Final	Denis Daly 0-4, Brendan O'Sullivan, Ronan Hussey (0-1f), Matthew O'Sullivan 0-2 each, Robert Wharton, Bryan Sheehan, Paul O'Donoghue (0-1f), Graham O'Sullivan, Niall O'Shea 0-1 each	av av	Shane Ryan 0-5f, Paul Murphy and George O'Keefe 0-2 each, Donal O'Sullivan, Cathal Murphy, Mark Reen 0-1 each	Fitzgerald Stadium; Referee: Paul Hayes (Kerins O'Rahillys); Man of the Match: Robert Wharton (Renard)

=== Semi-finals ===
7 October 2017; 3:00 pm Semi-Final	South Kerry	0-12 - 1-8	Kerins O'Rahillys	Fitzgerald Stadium; Referee: Edmund Walshe (Rathmore); Man of the Match: Bryan Sheehan (St. Mary's Cahirciveen)
7 October 2017; 3:00 pm Semi-Final	Bryan Sheehan and Daniel Daly (0-1f) 0-3 each, Mark Griffin, Paul O'Donoghue (1 '45), Ronan Hussey (0-1f), Matthew O'Sullivan, Niall O'Shea, Ian Galvin (0-1f) 0-1 each	Report av av	Jack Savage 1-2 (1-0 pen, 0-1f), Barry John Keane 0-3 (0-2f), Tommy Begley, Tommy Walsh, John Ferguson 0-1 each	Fitzgerald Stadium; Referee: Edmund Walshe (Rathmore); Man of the Match: Bryan Sheehan (St. Mary's Cahirciveen)

7 October 2017; 4:45 pm Semi-Final	Dr. Crokes	5-13 - 0-14	West Kerry	Fitzgerald Stadium; Referee: Brendan Griffin (Clounmacon); Man of the Match: Colm Cooper
7 October 2017; 4:45 pm Semi-Final	Colm Cooper 1-3 (0-2f), Jordan Kiely 2-0, Daithi Casey 1-1, Paul Clarke 1-0, Micheál Burns, Brian Looney, Tony Brosnan 0-2 each, Shane Murphy (1 '45), Gavin White, Johnny Buckley 0-1 each	Report	Sean Micheál Ó Conchúir 0-5 (0-2f), Dara Ó Sé 0-4 (0-2f), Eanna Ó Conchúir 0-3 (0-1f), Alan Fitgerald and Jason Hickson 0-1 each	Fitzgerald Stadium; Referee: Brendan Griffin (Clounmacon); Man of the Match: Colm Cooper

== Final ==
22 October 2017; 3:00 pm Final	Dr. Crokes	0-17 - 1-12	South Kerry	Austin Stack Park, Tralee; Referee: Brendan Griffin (Clounmacon); Man of the Match: Gavin White
22 October 2017; 3:00 pm Final	Daithi Casey 0-5 (0-3f), Michael Burns and Kieran O'Leary 0-4 each, Tony Brosnan 0-2, Gavin White and Jordan Kiely 0-1	Report av av	Bryan Sheehan 0-7 (0-3f, 1 '45), Ian Galvin 1-0, Paul O'Donoghue 0-2, Brendan O'Sullivan, Conor O'Shea, Ronan Hussey 0-1 each	Austin Stack Park, Tralee; Referee: Brendan Griffin (Clounmacon); Man of the Match: Gavin White

== Relegation ==
The club team to be relegated from the Senior County Championship will be the same team to be relegated from the Senior Club Championship. The 8 senior clubs play off against each other in Round 1 of the Club Championship. The 4 losers enter a relegation playoff with the losers entering a relegation final. This loser will be relegated to the I.F.C. for 2018. Should a club reach the final of the County championship they will be exempt from the Relegation process in the Club championship.

22 October 2017
1:00 pm
Relegation Final

Kerins O'Rahilly's	2-12 - 1-10	Kilcummin
Barry John Keane 1-4(2f), Jack Savage 0-7(7f), Gavin O’Brien 1-0, Rory Molloy 0-1.	Report av av	Kevin McCarthy 1-3(2f), Matt Keane 0-3, Noel Duggan 0-2, Brendan Kealy 0-2(1f,’45)

Austin Stack Park

== Championship statistics ==
=== Miscellaneous ===
- Colm Cooper and Eoin Brosnan brake Paudie Sheehys record as they win their 7th SFC medal.
- Dr Crokes go level with Austin Stacks at the top of the Roll of Honor with a 12th title.
- Kilcummin are relegated after 20 years as a senior club.
