= Thomas Davis GAA =

Sports club in County Dublin, Ireland

Thomas Davis
- Tomás Dáibhís
- Founded: 1888
- County: Dublin
- Nickname: Davis's / The Little Village
- Colours: Green with gold sash
- Grounds: Kiltipper Road, Tallaght
- Coordinates: 53°16′20″N 6°21′46″W

Playing kits
Standard colours

Senior Club Championships
	All Ireland	Leinster champions	Dublin champions
Football:	0	2	3
Hurling:	0	0	1

Thomas Davis (Irish: CLG Tomás Dáibhís) is a Gaelic Athletic Association club based in Tallaght, County Dublin, Ireland. Founded in 1888, Thomas Davis has a long association with Tallaght from the time when it was a small rural village in the countryside. The club motto is Nascann Dúshlán Daoine (a challenge unites people). The club's grounds and clubhouse are located on the Kiltipper Road in Tallaght.

== History ==
The club was formed in 1888 and for many years played their football in the Old Bawn area of Tallaght. In the early 1960s, they moved their playing pitch to the Belgard Road and then on to what was known as the Grave Yard pitch behind the Grave Yard in Tallaght Village.

Hugh Kelly played for Dublin in 1930. Other Davis players to play at inter-county level were Paul Curran, Dave Foran and Martin Noctor who won an All Ireland and Leinster medal. In Ladies' Gaelic football, Siobhán McGrath has won two All Star Awards and an All-Ireland medal.

Thomas Davis have won the Dublin Senior Football Championship on three occasions in 1989, 1990 and 1991. The club went on to win the Leinster Senior Club Football Championship twice (in 1990 and 1991), on both occasions after defeating the then Wicklow champions, Baltinglass. The club also won the Dublin Under 21 Football Championship in 1992, beating Fingallians, 1–7 to 0–8.

Thomas Davis won the Dublin Senior Hurling Championship once, in 1913.

In 2006, Thomas Davis faced Round Towers in the final of the Dublin AFL Division 1 and won by a scoreline of 0–10 to 0-07. Shane Smith played a prominent role in this final, scoring 8 points in a game which denied Round Towers their first ever league title.

In 2007, Davis won the John Humphrey Memorial Cup by beating Lucan Sarsfields in the final.

== Facilities ==
=== Club grounds ===
For many years Thomas Davis played on a field adjacent to the Church of Ireland chapel, known as 'The Graveyard' in Old Tallaght Village (beside the Belgard Road where Smyths Toys is currently located) before relocating in the early 1980s to a green field site on the Kiltipper Road. The club continued to use the Graveyard, together with public pitches in Seán Walsh Park, Dodder Park and Aylesbury throughout the 1990s. The Seán Walsh Park fields were subsequently redeveloped into a man-made lake and landscaped areas, with plans for a stadium to be there also (see below). Early development of club facilities were primarily financed through private sources, including the sale of life memberships, a series of large-scale private members draws and general club fund raising activities. In more recent years, the club has also benefited from grants from the Department of Arts, Sport and Tourism. Government grants totalled in excess of €500,000 from 2001 to 2003. A further grant of €200,000 was announced in April 2007.

=== Tallaght Stadium dispute ===
Prior to its construction and opening in 2009, Thomas Davis were involved in a number of objections relating to Tallaght Stadium. Thomas Davis objected to the original planning permission and later sought to overturn a council decision on the stadium. The club's initial complaint arose as the surface dimensions were unsuited to use as a senior GAA pitch. The Minister for Sport and South Dublin County Council (SDCC) indicated, however, that Junior GAA games could be accommodated in the design. While SDCC initially proposed that the stadium would only be used for association football (soccer), this was reversed in January 2006 when SDCC proposed that the development include a senior-sized GAA pitch. The council later reverted to the original plans after they were informed by the Minister for Sport that a multi-use stadium would not be funded.

In a High Court application to have the stadium design changed to include scope for GAA games, Thomas Davis argued that they would be placed "at a severe disadvantage in attracting the youth of Tallaght to our club, our sport and the GAA culture". In a reserved judgment, made on 30 March 2007, Justice Iarflaidh O'Neill found in favour of the club, stating that it had established a "substantial interest" in the case and raised the necessary "substantial" grounds required for a judicial review of the planning decisions. However, in the subsequent judicial review in December 2007, Mr Justice Roderick Murphy ruled against Thomas Davis. A subsequent application, for an appeal to the Supreme Court, was refused at a hearing on 25 January 2008. At the hearing, Thomas Davis were instructed to pay the costs of South Dublin County Council.

== Achievements ==
- Leinster Senior Club Football Championship: (2): 1990, 1991
- Dublin Senior Football Championship (3): 1989, 1990, 1991
- Dublin Senior 2 Football Championship (1): 2018
- Dublin Junior Football Championship (2): 1957, 1982
- Dublin Junior C Football Championship (1): 2013
- Dublin Under 21 Football Championship (1): 1992
- Dublin Under 21 B Football Championship (1):
- Dublin Minor Football Championship (1): 1991
- Dublin Minor D Football Championship (1): 2017
- Dublin Senior Football League (2): 2001, 2006
- Dublin Senior Hurling Championship (1): 1913
- Dublin Intermediate Hurling Championship (1): 2017
- Dublin Junior E Hurling Championship (1): 2013
- Dublin Under 21 B Hurling Championship (1): 2016
- Dublin Minor C Hurling Championship (1): 2012
- Dublin Minor D Hurling Championship (1): 2010

== Notable players ==
- Paul Curran, former All-Ireland winner and Texaco Footballer of the Year with Dublin
- Katie Fitzhenry, club member and rugby player with the Ireland women's national rugby union team
- Davy Keogh, hurler with Dublin senior squad
- Paul Nugent, former Dublin senior football selector
- Zak Moradi, hurler with Thomas Davis and the Leitrim hurling team
