= Dr Crokes GAA =

Gaelic sports club in County Kerry, Ireland

Dr Crokes
- Dr Chrócaigh
- Founded: 1886
- County: Kerry
- Nickname: The Crokes
- Colours: Black & Amber
- Grounds: Dr Crokes GAA Grounds, Lewis Road, Killarney
- Coordinates: 52°04′03.38″N 9°30′11.74″W

Playing kits
Home Kit	Change Kit

Senior Club Championships
	All Ireland	Munster champions	Kerry champions
Football:	2	8	14

Dr Crokes is a Gaelic football and hurling club based in Killarney in County Kerry, Ireland. Notable players include Colm Cooper, Eoin Brosnan, Johnny Buckley and Tony Brosnan.

Founded in 1886, the club's successes include the capture of the All-Ireland Senior Club Football Championship in 1992 and 2017. The club has won the Munster Club Championship on eight occasions - 1991, 1992, 2006, 2011, 2012, 2013, 2016 and 2018. The club has won the Kerry Senior Football Championship on fourteen occasions, most recently in the 2024 Kerry Senior Football Championship.

Dr Crokes is the only club in Killarney with a hurling team, which has won the Kerry Intermediate Hurling Championship in 1999 and 2001.

== History ==
Dr Croke's was founded in 1886. Many members were involved in politics and a lot of them ended up in English prisons. One of the first notable players was Dick Fitzgerald who was a huge part of the team that brought the first All-Ireland title to the Kingdom in 1903. Another notable club member of that time is Eugene O'Sullivan, a nationalist MP, who became chairman of the Kerry county board, and it was during his tenure that Kerry won four more of its 36 All-Ireland titles at senior football level.

A total of 77 senior All Ireland medals have been won to date by Dr Crokes players.

In addition to the Kerry players, Dr Eamon O'Sullivan of the Crokes coached and trained Kerry All Ireland winning teams, beginning in 1924, and ending in 1962.

Dr Croke's has owned four playing fields; the first being the Cricket Field, Flesk Bridge, which was used up to the 1930s. In 1936 Fitzgerald Stadium was built by the club members in memory of Dr Croke and Kerry legend Dick Fitzgerald. In the past 20 years two new playing complexes have been acquired and developed by the club at Deerpark and Lewis Road to cater for the ever increasing number of members.

Fr Tom Looney, writing of the Club's early years, said that the senior team had played tournaments and challenges before the County Board was formed. He also stated that the Club captain – John Langford – was one of the committee members at the inaugural meeting of the Kerry county board and that the Club lost the first Kerry County final to Laune Rangers, in what all agreed was the finest match ever witnessed.

Another County final was lost in 1900 before the beginning of a glorious spell when they became known as the Clear Air Boys, or Dickeen Fitz’s (Dick Fitzgerald) team. Four county championships were won in a sixteen–year period, including three in a row: 1912, 1913 and 1914.

The club went into decline, having very lean times on the football field in the 1930s, '40s and early '50s, which was surprising because they could still call on some top class players – three county players at any given time, and the administration was well organised.

In the 1950s the team again became the dominant team in East Kerry, winning ten O'Donoghue Cups in a fifteen-year span, but did not advance past the final stages of the Kerry Senior Football Championship. The team had limited success in the following years, though it maintained its standard of play. Entering the 1980s, with a youth policy that had been in place for several years, the team went on to repeat its earlier success.

Everything seemed to go right in the centennial (1986), when the Dr Crokes won the Kerry Intermediate Football Championship, the County Club Championship, and the County League, however they ultimately lost again in the two County Finals. They went on to win the Kerry Senior Football Championship in 1991, the Munster Senior Club Football Championship in 1990 and 1991, and the prestigious All-Ireland Senior Club Football Championship in Croke Park on St. Patrick's Day 1992.

Hurling, which played such an important role within the club in the 1920s, 30s and 40s, was revived and organized in the centennial year. In a short time they have made a huge impact – winning East Kerry competitions, County League Division 3, and were crowned Intermediate Champions of Kerry for 1999 and again in 2000.

The Dr Croke ladies played camogie during the 1920s and 1930s. The club's players currently participate in football, with underage players representing Kerry and winning All-Ireland medals at the under-14 and under-16 levels.

Dr. Crokes have three adult teams football– A, B & C, an under 21, minor, under 16s, 14s, 12s, and coaching every Saturday mornings for under 6, 8, and 10s. hurling 1 intermediate, u16, 14, 12, 10, 8. ladies football Senior, minor, u16, 14, 12, 10, 8.

== Books ==
Dr. Crokes clubmen have published 5 Gaelic football related books:

- Dick Fitzgerald: How to play Gaelic football (1914)
- Dr. Eamonn O'Sullivan: The Art and Science of Gaelic football (1958)
- Club History: Dr. Crokes Gaelic Century (1886–1986)
- Club History: Decade of Glory 1986-1996
- Pat O'Shea: Gaelic football, Training Drills (1996)
- Fr. Tom Looney: King in a Kingdom of Kings (2008)

== Notable members ==
- Eoin Brosnan
- Johnny Buckley
- Brian Looney
- Sean Clarke
- Pat O' Shea
- Colm Cooper
- Kieran Cremin
- Archbishop Dr Croke Patron
- Fionn Fitzgerald
- Kieran O'Leary
- Seanie O'Shea
- Gavin White

== Achievements ==
=== Football ===
- All-Ireland Senior Club Football Championship (2) - 1992, 2017
- Munster Senior Club Football Championship (9) - 1990, 1991, 2006, 2011, 2012 2013, 2016, 2018, 2024
- Munster Senior Football League Champions (1) 2004
- Kerry Senior Football Championship (14) - 1901, 1912, 1913, 1914, 1991, 2000, 2010, 2011, 2012, 2013 2016 2017, 2018, 2024
- Kerry Senior Club Football Championship (11) - 1987, 1990, 1992, 1993, 1996, 2011, 2012, 2013, 2014 2017, 2018
- Kerry Intermediate Football Championship (1) 1985
- Kerry Under-21 Football Championship (2) 1986, 2011
- Kerry County Football League - Division 1 (12) 1988, 2000, 2004, 2005, 2010, 2012, 2015, 2016, 2017, 2018, 2023, 2024
- Minor County League Football Championship (7) 1976, 1977, 1982, 1983, 2004, 2005, 2016
- East Kerry Senior Football Championship (O'Donoghue Cup) (32) - 1956, 1957,1958, 1959, 1960, 1961, 1962, 1964, 1965, 1968, 1981, 1982, 1986, 1990, 1991, 1992, 1993, 1995, 2000, 2002, 2004, 2006, 2007, 2008, 2009, 2010, 2011, 2012, 2013, 2018, 2020, 2022, 2023. 2025

=== Hurling ===
- Kerry Intermediate Hurling Championship 1999, 2001, 2020, 2026
- Kerry Junior Hurling Championship Champions - 1990
- Kerry Under-21 Hurling Championship: (1) 2019 (with Kenmare/Kilgarvin)
- Kerry Div 2 Hurling Champions -2004

=== Ladies Football ===
- Ladies Junior County Champions - 2009
- Ladies Intermediate County Champions - 2004, 2022

Preceded by Lavey	All-Ireland Senior Club Football Champions; 1992	Succeeded by O'Donovan Rossa
