= John Flynn (Irish politician) =

Irish politician (1894–1968)

- Flynn, c. 1920s

Teachta Dála
- In office February 1948 – March 1957
- In office July 1937 – June 1943
- Constituency: Kerry South
- In office February 1932 – July 1937
- Constituency: Kerry

Personal details
- Born: 1894 Cahersiveen, County Kerry, Ireland
- Died: 23 August 1968 (aged 73–74) Dublin, Ireland
- Party: Fianna Fáil
- Other political affiliations: Independent Republican

Military service
- Branch/service: Irish Republican Army; Anti-Treaty IRA
- Years of service: 1920–1923
- Rank: Battalion Commandant
- Unit: A Company (Milltown), 5 Battalion, 1 Kerry Brigade; Brigade Active Service Unit, 1 Kerry Brigade; Battalion ASU, 6 Battalion, 2 Kerry Brigade
- Commands: Column commander, Battalion ASU, 6 Battalion, 2 Kerry Brigade; Battalion Commandant, 6 Battalion

John Flynn (1894 – 23 August 1968), known as Jack Flynn, was an Irish Fianna Fáil politician who served as a Teachta Dála (TD) for Kerry and Kerry South from 1932 to 1943 and from 1948 to 1957. (Note: Some sources give the date of Flynn's death as 22 August 1968.)

A farmer from near Castlemaine, Flynn served in the IRA during the Irish War of Independence, taking part in the Ballymacandy Ambush of June 1921, and took the anti-Treaty side in the Irish Civil War. He was elected to Kerry County Council in 1926 and to the Dáil for Fianna Fáil in 1932, and was widely regarded as a diligent and popular constituency representative. Ahead of the 1943 general election he was dropped as a Fianna Fáil candidate, following unproven rumours about his private life, and he did not contest the elections of 1943 and 1944. He returned to the Dáil as an independent republican in 1948 and rejoined Fianna Fáil in November 1951.

Flynn is best remembered for an assault on the Fine Gael TD Oliver J. Flanagan in the Dáil restaurant on 31 January 1952, committed hours after Flanagan made a remark in the chamber that alluded to those rumours about his personal life. The Dáil's Committee on Procedure and Privileges found Flynn guilty of contempt, while also finding that Flanagan's remark had breached the order and decorum of the House. Flynn lost his seat in 1957 and died in Dublin in 1968.

== Revolutionary period ==
A farmer from Brackhill, Castlemaine, Flynn was a member of A Company (Milltown), 5 Battalion, 1 Kerry Brigade, Irish Republican Army (IRA) and Brigade Active Service Unit, 1 Kerry Brigade, IRA during the Irish War of Independence, and took part in the Ballymacandy Ambush in which five members of the Royal Irish Constabulary were killed. The ambush took place on 1 June 1921, a few weeks before the Truce, when IRA, Fianna Éireann and Cumann na mBan units from mid-Kerry attacked an RIC bicycle patrol on the road between Milltown and Castlemaine. The ambush occurred close to Flynn's home, and a fellow participant, Dan Keating, later recalled taking up position with two other riflemen in "Flynn's house", which had a clear view of the main bridge. The IRA's only casualty was Jerry Myles, who was badly wounded. The historian Owen O'Shea has shown that three of the five dead were Irish Catholic policemen rather than Black and Tans, among them Sergeant James Collery, a father of nine from Milltown.

Taking the anti-Treaty side in the Irish Civil War, Flynn was Column Commander of Battalion ASU, 6 Battalion, 2 Kerry Brigade, IRA and Battalion Commandant. He took part in several attacks on National forces across County Kerry until early 1923 and was on the run evading arrest until Summer 1924. In September 1922, after anti-Treaty forces had seized a cargo of flour at Keel, Flynn led an IRA party that called on Michael and Margaret Larkin, who ran a bar and bakery in Milltown. According to O'Shea, the Larkins resisted but were pressed into buying 160 half sacks of flour for £192, money that Flynn later used to buy boots and clothing for his men. The transaction came to the attention of the Free State Army, and troops under Commandant David Neligan raided the premises on 22 September 1922, destroying stock and arresting Michael Larkin. Flynn was later awarded a pension by the Irish government under the Military Service Pensions Act, 1934 for his service with the IRA between 1920 and 1923.

== Early political career ==
Flynn won a seat on Kerry County Council as a republican candidate in the Killorglin electoral area in 1926 and joined Fianna Fáil in the same year. (Note: The Irish Press obituary of 1968 states that Flynn was a member of Kerry County Council from 1927.) In 1929 he was charged in the Circuit Court in Tralee with membership of an illegal organisation and possession of unlicensed firearms and ammunition, and the jury returned verdicts of not guilty.

He was first elected as a Fianna Fáil TD at the 1932 general election for the Kerry constituency, heading the poll with almost 13% of the vote in a seven-seat constituency in which Fianna Fáil won five seats. He was re-elected at the 1933 general election for the same constituency and he was elected for the Kerry South constituency at the 1937 and 1938 general elections.

Flynn chaired the Kerry County Board of Health from 1931 to 1934. In 1932 the board secured £55,000 from the Irish Hospitals' Sweepstake for the construction of St Catherine's Hospital in Tralee. Flynn was replaced as chairman after the 1934 local elections, when Fianna Fáil adopted a policy that its TDs should not chair local authority sub-committees.

In the Dáil, Flynn was a regular contributor to debates and a frequent questioner of ministers, concentrating on rural matters such as fishing, agriculture and infrastructure, as well as housing and social conditions. His fellow Kerry South TD John O'Leary recalled him as one of the dominant political figures in the constituency and as exceptionally popular across it.

== Departure from Fianna Fáil and independent years ==
Flynn did not contest the 1943 and 1944 general elections. He had been denied a nomination by the party leadership under Éamon de Valera, and the Irish Press reported on 27 May 1943 that he had "withdrawn his candidature". Contemporary newspapers gave no reason, but it was rumoured that Flynn, a bachelor, had been in a relationship with a young woman and had fathered a child with her. O'Leary later recalled the version of the story then in circulation: that a girl had become pregnant by Flynn outside marriage and had gone to England, and that de Valera, on learning of it, removed Flynn from the party to avoid a scandal. The allegation was never proven, and Flynn's supporters believed it to be politically motivated and without foundation. No documentary evidence explaining the decision has been produced.

At the 1948 general election, he was elected as an Independent Republican TD, with the support of Old IRA colleagues such as Dan Mulvihill and of figures in Gaelic games. In a letter of 13 February 1948, the chairman of the Fianna Fáil constituency organisation in Kerry South, Fr Myles Allman, lamented the situation in which Flynn had left the party, with only one Fianna Fáil deputy remaining in the constituency, Honor Crowley. Flynn was re-elected at the 1951 general election, also as an Independent Republican. In the Dáil debate on the nomination of the Taoiseach in June 1951 he supported de Valera's return to office, a marked change from his stance in 1948, and was challenged on the point by Oliver J. Flanagan, who asked whether Flynn had a mandate from his constituents to do so. On 10 November 1951 the Fianna Fáil constituency organisation in Kerry South unanimously agreed to readmit him to membership.

== Assault on Oliver J. Flanagan (1952) ==
Oliver J. Flanagan provoked Flynn by referring, on the Dáil record, of the rumours which had dogged Flynn's career for several years prior.

During the Dáil's Order of Business on 31 January 1952, the independent TD Noël Browne referred to a mention of an Adoption of Children Bill in a list of legislation read out by Liam Cosgrave. Cosgrave, who had already spoken, interjected that he had made no reference to such a Bill. Oliver J. Flanagan, then an independent TD for Laois–Offaly, interjected: "Deputy Flynn would be more qualified to do that". Flynn was not in the chamber at the time. The remark is understood to have alluded to the unproven rumour that Flynn had fathered a child outside marriage, and to have linked him to the subject of adoption legislation; O'Shea and Revington write that this is assumed to be what prompted it, and the political scientist Mark O'Brien describes it as a covert reference to an alleged political sex scandal. The Committee on Procedure and Privileges later noted that the presiding Leas-Cheann Comhairle had not grasped the implications of the remark owing to its ambiguity, and would in any case have hesitated to censure it, since doing so would have drawn attention to its possible scandalous meaning.

Flynn learned of the remark, and that evening approached Flanagan in the Dáil restaurant, where he was talking to James Dillon, and challenged him over it. In the account that the Fine Gael leader John A. Costello gave the Dáil, Flynn came up behind Flanagan, turned him round, used an offensive expression and struck him in the mouth; Costello added that Flynn had also assaulted an usher. The Fianna Fáil TD Robert Briscoe, who had been present in the restaurant, disputed Costello's version, as did Flynn himself, while Major Vivion de Valera asked the Ceann Comhairle to take into account the "provocative personal remarks" Flanagan had made. The committee found that there was no essential disagreement on the facts, namely that Flynn had accosted Flanagan and struck him twice. Flynn told the committee that he acted because he had learned that Flanagan had made a remark about him "which would be generally understood as a gross reflection on his personal character", and that he felt no adequate remedy was available to him under Standing Orders for words spoken under parliamentary privilege. Flanagan denied that he had intended any hidden meaning and said that he had referred solely to Flynn's political activities.

The committee reported on 28 February 1952. It held that Flynn had been "guilty of contempt in taking, as it were, the law into his own hands in redress of a grievance properly a matter for the House itself", but it also declined to exculpate Flanagan, whose remark it regarded as a breach of the order and decorum of the House. It recommended that Flynn's contempt be regarded as purged on receipt of a public reprimand. The Dáil adopted the report and Flynn was reprimanded by the Ceann Comhairle on 5 March 1952. The national newspapers reported both the assault and the inquiry but, in keeping with the reticence of Irish journalism on sexual matters at the time, none of them reported what Flanagan had said.

== Later career and death ==
Flynn was re-elected a Fianna Fáil TD at the 1954 general election. He stood as a Fianna Fáil candidate at the 1957 general election, but was not re-elected, losing his seat in the year that John Joe Rice won Sinn Féin's first and only Dáil seat in Kerry South. He stood down from Kerry County Council in 1960. Flynn died in Dublin in August 1968.

== Personal life ==
Flynn never married. John O'Leary recalled that he had no fixed address for much of his political life and spent weekends lodging with supporters in different parts of the constituency, a habit that kept him known and accessible in even its more remote areas. He was a long-distance runner and a keen weightlifter and shot-putter, and O'Shea and Revington suggest that his sporting profile helped his electoral prospects. He also owned an hotel in Killarney.

== Notes ==
Dáil	Election	Deputy (Party)	Deputy (Party)	Deputy (Party)	Deputy (Party)	Deputy (Party)	Deputy (Party)	Deputy (Party)
4th	1923	Tom McEllistrim (Rep)	Austin Stack (Rep)	Patrick Cahill (Rep)	Thomas O'Donoghue (Rep)	James Crowley (CnaG)	Fionán Lynch (CnaG)	John O'Sullivan (CnaG)
5th	1927 (Jun)	Tom McEllistrim (FF)	Austin Stack (SF)	William O'Leary (FF)	Thomas O'Reilly (FF)	James Crowley (CnaG)	Fionán Lynch (CnaG)	John O'Sullivan (CnaG)
6th	1927 (Sep)	Tom McEllistrim (FF)	Frederick Crowley (FF)	William O'Leary (FF)	Thomas O'Reilly (FF)	James Crowley (CnaG)	Fionán Lynch (CnaG)	John O'Sullivan (CnaG)
7th	1932	Tom McEllistrim (FF)	Frederick Crowley (FF)	John Flynn (FF)	Thomas O'Reilly (FF)	Eamon Kissane (FF)	Fionán Lynch (CnaG)	John O'Sullivan (CnaG)
8th	1933	Tom McEllistrim (FF)	Frederick Crowley (FF)	John Flynn (FF)	Denis Daly (FF)	Eamon Kissane (FF)	Fionán Lynch (CnaG)	John O'Sullivan (CnaG)
9th	1937	Constituency abolished. See Kerry North and Kerry South						

Dáil	Election	Deputy (Party)	Deputy (Party)	Deputy (Party)	Deputy (Party)	Deputy (Party)
32nd	2016	Martin Ferris (SF)	Michael Healy-Rae (Ind.)	Danny Healy-Rae (Ind.)	John Brassil (FF)	Brendan Griffin (FG)
33rd	2020	Pa Daly (SF)	Michael Healy-Rae (Ind.)	Danny Healy-Rae (Ind.)	Norma Foley (FF)	Brendan Griffin (FG)
34th	2024	Pa Daly (SF)	Michael Healy-Rae (Ind.)	Danny Healy-Rae (Ind.)	Norma Foley (FF)	Michael Cahill (FF)

Dáil	Election	Deputy (Party)	Deputy (Party)	Deputy (Party)
9th	1937	John Flynn (FF)	Frederick Crowley (FF)	Fionán Lynch (FG)
10th	1938	John Flynn (FF)	Frederick Crowley (FF)	Fionán Lynch (FG)
11th	1943	John Healy (FF)	Frederick Crowley (FF)	Fionán Lynch (FG)
12th	1944	John Healy (FF)	Frederick Crowley (FF)	Fionán Lynch (FG)
12th	1944 by-election	John Healy (FF)	Frederick Crowley (FF)	Donal O'Donoghue (FF)
12th	1945 by-election	John Healy (FF)	Honor Crowley (FF)	Donal O'Donoghue (FF)
13th	1948	John Flynn (Ind.)	Honor Crowley (FF)	Patrick Palmer (FG)
14th	1951	John Flynn (Ind.)	Honor Crowley (FF)	Patrick Palmer (FG)
15th	1954	John Flynn (FF)	Honor Crowley (FF)	Patrick Palmer (FG)
16th	1957	John Joe Rice (SF)	Honor Crowley (FF)	Patrick Palmer (FG)
17th	1961	Timothy O'Connor (FF)	Honor Crowley (FF)	Patrick Connor (FG)
18th	1965	Timothy O'Connor (FF)	Honor Crowley (FF)	Patrick Connor (FG)
18th	1966 by-election	Timothy O'Connor (FF)	John O'Leary (FF)	Patrick Connor (FG)
19th	1969	Timothy O'Connor (FF)	John O'Leary (FF)	Michael Begley (FG)
20th	1973	Timothy O'Connor (FF)	John O'Leary (FF)	Michael Begley (FG)
21st	1977	Timothy O'Connor (FF)	John O'Leary (FF)	Michael Begley (FG)
22nd	1981	Michael Moynihan (Lab)	John O'Leary (FF)	Michael Begley (FG)
23rd	1982 (Feb)	Michael Moynihan (Lab)	John O'Leary (FF)	Michael Begley (FG)
24th	1982 (Nov)	Michael Moynihan (Lab)	John O'Leary (FF)	Michael Begley (FG)
25th	1987	John O'Donoghue (Note: O'Donoghue served as Ceann Comhairle in the 30th Dáil from 2007 to 2009.) (FF)	John O'Leary (FF)	Michael Begley (FG)
26th	1989	John O'Donoghue (FF)	John O'Leary (FF)	Michael Moynihan (Lab)
27th	1992	John O'Donoghue (FF)	John O'Leary (FF)	Breeda Moynihan-Cronin (Lab)
28th	1997	John O'Donoghue (FF)	Jackie Healy-Rae (Ind.)	Breeda Moynihan-Cronin (Lab)
29th	2002	John O'Donoghue (FF)	Jackie Healy-Rae (Ind.)	Breeda Moynihan-Cronin (Lab)
30th	2007	John O'Donoghue (FF)	Jackie Healy-Rae (Ind.)	Tom Sheahan (FG)
31st	2011	Tom Fleming (Ind.)	Michael Healy-Rae (Ind.)	Brendan Griffin (FG)
32nd	2016	Constituency abolished. See Kerry		
