= 1945 Kerry South by-election =

By-election to the 12th Dáil

- 4 December 1945
- Turnout: 18,501 (51.4%)
	Crowley	Horan
Nominee	Honor Crowley	Edmund Horan
Party	Fianna Fáil	Clann na Talmhan
First preferences	10,483	8,018
Percentage	56.7%	43.3%
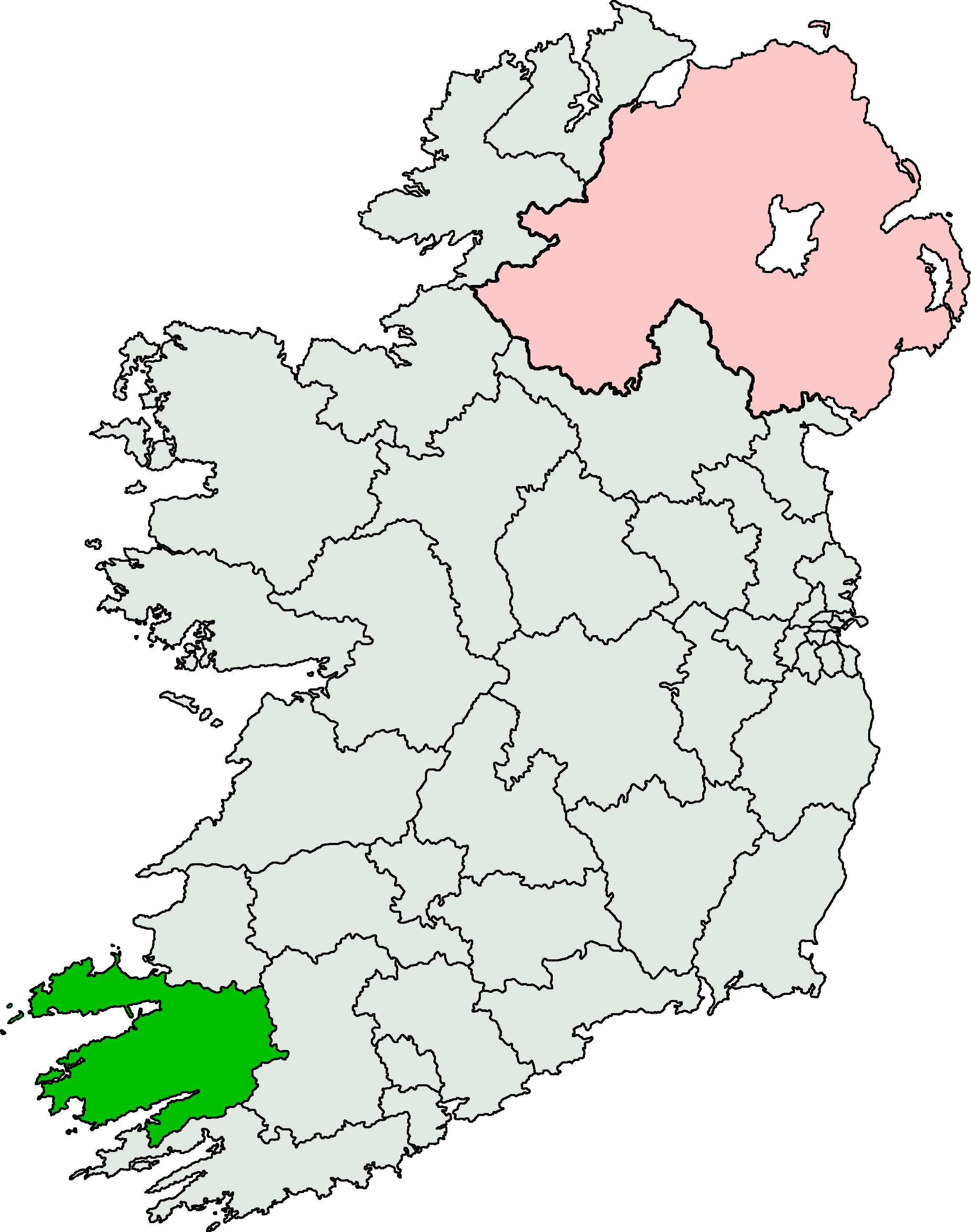
- Kerry South shown within ireland
TD before election
Frederick Crowley
Fianna Fáil
TD after election
Honor Crowley
Fianna Fáil

A Dáil by-election was held in the constituency of Kerry South in Ireland on Tuesday, 4 December 1945, to fill a vacancy in the 12th Dáil. It followed the death of Fianna Fáil TD Frederick Crowley on 5 May 1945.

In 1945, Kerry South was a three seat constituency comprising the southern half of County Kerry taking in the Dingle and Iveragh Peninsulas.

The writ of election to fill the vacancy was agreed by the Dáil on 14 November 1945.

The by-election was won by the Fianna Fáil candidate Honor Crowley, widow of the deceased TD, Frederick Crowley.

Four other by-elections were held on the same day: in Clare, Dublin North-West, Mayo South and Wexford. Three by-elections were won by Fianna Fáil, one by Clann na Talmhan, and one by Labour.

This was the second by-election in Kerry South during the 12th Dáil.

== Result ==
1945 Kerry South by-election
Party	Candidate	FPv%	Count
Party	Candidate	FPv%	1
Fianna Fáil	Honor Crowley	56.7	10,483
Clann na Talmhan	Edmund Horan	43.3	8,018
Electorate: 36,029 Valid: 18,501 Quota: 9,251 Turnout: 51.4%
