= 1966 Kerry South by-election =

By-election to the 18th Dáil

- 7 December 1966
- Turnout: 27,223 (76.0%)
	O'Leary	Begley	Moynihan
Nominee	John O'Leary	Michael Begley	Michael Moynihan
Party	Fianna Fáil	Fine Gael	Labour
First preferences	12,499	9,875	4,849
Percentage	45.9%	36.3%	17.8%
Final count	13,590	12,807	–
TD before election
Honor Crowley
Fianna Fáil
TD after election
John O'Leary
Fianna Fáil

A Dáil by-election was held in the constituency of Kerry South in Ireland on Wednesday, 7 December 1966, to fill a vacancy in the 18th Dáil. It followed the death of Fianna Fáil Teachta Dála (TD) Honor Crowley on 18 October 1966.

The writ of election to fill the vacancy was agreed by the Dáil on 17 November 1966.

The by-election was won by the Fianna Fáil candidate John O'Leary. It was held on the same day as the 1966 Waterford by-election. Both by-elections were won by Fianna Fáil candidates.

== Result ==
1966 Kerry South by-election
Party	Candidate	FPv%	Count	
Party	Candidate	FPv%	1	2
Fianna Fáil	John O'Leary	45.9	12,499	13,590
Fine Gael	Michael Begley	36.3	9,875	12,807
Labour	Michael Moynihan	17.8	4,849	
Electorate: 35,832 Valid: 27,223 Quota: 13,612 Turnout: 76.0%
