= John O'Leary (Kerry politician) =

Irish politician (1933–2015)

Minister of State
- 1978–1979: Environment

Teachta Dála
- In office December 1966 – June 1997
- Constituency: Kerry South

Personal details
- Born: 3 May 1933 Killarney, County Kerry, Ireland
- Died: 5 October 2015 (aged 82) Cork, Ireland
- Party: Fianna Fáil
- Spouse: Judy O'Leary (m. 1965; died 2010)
- Children: 7
- Education: St. Brendan's College

John O'Leary (3 May 1933 – 5 October 2015) was an Irish Fianna Fáil politician who served as Minister of State at the Department of the Environment from 1978 to 1979. He served as a Teachta Dála (TD) for the Kerry South constituency from 1966 to 1997.

== Early life ==
He was born in Dunrine in the Parish of Kilcummin, Killarney, County Kerry, in 1933. He was educated at Coolick National School and St. Brendan's College, Killarney. He joined the staff of Kerry County Council in 1952 and worked in Housing, Accounts and Health sections over the next 10 years. In July 1962, he was appointed as Acting town clerk of Killarney Urban District Council and later appointed Staff Officer in the Health and Hospitals section of Kerry County Council. When the new Planning department of the Council was launched O'Leary was put in charge of this until his resignation and election to Dáil Éireann in 1966.

== Political career ==
O'Leary was first elected to Dáil Éireann at the December 1966 by-election to succeed Honor Crowley. Crowley had previously succeeded her husband, Frederick Crowley in 1945. He was re-elected at the 1969 general election and was subsequently appointed to the Dáil Select Committee on Procedures and Privileges from 1969 to 1973. He also represented the government at the 1st World Conference on the Environment in Stockholm, Sweden, in 1972. He was one of five TDs to attend the funerals of the victims of Bloody Sunday in Derry in 1972.

He was re-elected at the head of the poll at the 1973 general election. He was appointed to membership of the Council of Europe from 1973 to 1975 on the nomination of the Fianna Fáil Leader Jack Lynch and from 1975 to 1977 he served as Opposition Spokesperson on Physical Planning and the Environment.

He was elected as a member of Kerry County Council in 1974, gaining the 3rd seat for Fianna Fáil in the Killarney area. Again, he represented Fianna Fáil at the 2nd World Conference on the Environment held in Kingston, Jamaica, in 1976.

He was re-elected at the head of the poll at the 1977 general election. In January 1978, he was appointed Minister of State at the Department of the Environment with special responsibility for Planning, Roads, Water Safety, Housing, Traffic, Water and Sewerage Schemes. He resigned as a member of Kerry County Council in January 1978 and was replaced by P.J. Cronin. He was not reappointed as a Minister of State following the appointment of Charles Haughey as Taoiseach in December 1979.

He was re-elected at the 1981, February 1982 and November 1982 general elections. He was appointed by Charles Haughey as a member of the New Ireland Forum in 1983 and again in 1984. He stood again for the Kerry County Council elections in 1985 and won a fourth seat for the party in the Killarney local electoral area.

At the 1987 general election, he was again elected at the head of the poll before the third Fianna Fáil candidate was eliminated, leaving a pool of over 10,000 votes for John O'Donoghue to gain a second seat for the party. He was subsequently appointed to a number of Joint Oireachtas Committees. He was re-elected at the 1989 general election.

He was re-elected to Kerry County Council at the 1991 local elections. He was re-elected at the 1992 general election and selected as Vice-Chairman of the All-party Foreign Affairs Joint Oireachtas Committee and to the All-party Finance Committee.

He retired as a member of Kerry County Council in March 1996 and as a member of Dáil Éireann at the 1997 general election. Fianna Fáil selected his son Brian O'Leary to contest the seat. However, it was won by Jackie Healy-Rae who ran as an independent candidate when he was not selected by Fianna Fáil.

O'Leary's memoirs, On the Doorsteps: Memoirs of a long-serving TD were published by Irish Political Memoirs in 2015. In the book, O'Leary describes Charles Haughey as "vindictive" and supported by "thugs".

He died following a short illness on 5 October 2015.

Political offices
New office	Minister of State at the Department of the Environment; 1978–1979	Succeeded by Jackie Fahey

Dáil	Election	Deputy (Party)	Deputy (Party)	Deputy (Party)
9th	1937	John Flynn (FF)	Frederick Crowley (FF)	Fionán Lynch (FG)
10th	1938	John Flynn (FF)	Frederick Crowley (FF)	Fionán Lynch (FG)
11th	1943	John Healy (FF)	Frederick Crowley (FF)	Fionán Lynch (FG)
12th	1944	John Healy (FF)	Frederick Crowley (FF)	Fionán Lynch (FG)
12th	1944 by-election	John Healy (FF)	Frederick Crowley (FF)	Donal O'Donoghue (FF)
12th	1945 by-election	John Healy (FF)	Honor Crowley (FF)	Donal O'Donoghue (FF)
13th	1948	John Flynn (Ind.)	Honor Crowley (FF)	Patrick Palmer (FG)
14th	1951	John Flynn (Ind.)	Honor Crowley (FF)	Patrick Palmer (FG)
15th	1954	John Flynn (FF)	Honor Crowley (FF)	Patrick Palmer (FG)
16th	1957	John Joe Rice (SF)	Honor Crowley (FF)	Patrick Palmer (FG)
17th	1961	Timothy O'Connor (FF)	Honor Crowley (FF)	Patrick Connor (FG)
18th	1965	Timothy O'Connor (FF)	Honor Crowley (FF)	Patrick Connor (FG)
18th	1966 by-election	Timothy O'Connor (FF)	John O'Leary (FF)	Patrick Connor (FG)
19th	1969	Timothy O'Connor (FF)	John O'Leary (FF)	Michael Begley (FG)
20th	1973	Timothy O'Connor (FF)	John O'Leary (FF)	Michael Begley (FG)
21st	1977	Timothy O'Connor (FF)	John O'Leary (FF)	Michael Begley (FG)
22nd	1981	Michael Moynihan (Lab)	John O'Leary (FF)	Michael Begley (FG)
23rd	1982 (Feb)	Michael Moynihan (Lab)	John O'Leary (FF)	Michael Begley (FG)
24th	1982 (Nov)	Michael Moynihan (Lab)	John O'Leary (FF)	Michael Begley (FG)
25th	1987	John O'Donoghue (Note: O'Donoghue served as Ceann Comhairle in the 30th Dáil from 2007 to 2009.) (FF)	John O'Leary (FF)	Michael Begley (FG)
26th	1989	John O'Donoghue (FF)	John O'Leary (FF)	Michael Moynihan (Lab)
27th	1992	John O'Donoghue (FF)	John O'Leary (FF)	Breeda Moynihan-Cronin (Lab)
28th	1997	John O'Donoghue (FF)	Jackie Healy-Rae (Ind.)	Breeda Moynihan-Cronin (Lab)
29th	2002	John O'Donoghue (FF)	Jackie Healy-Rae (Ind.)	Breeda Moynihan-Cronin (Lab)
30th	2007	John O'Donoghue (FF)	Jackie Healy-Rae (Ind.)	Tom Sheahan (FG)
31st	2011	Tom Fleming (Ind.)	Michael Healy-Rae (Ind.)	Brendan Griffin (FG)
32nd	2016	Constituency abolished. See Kerry		
