= Brendan Griffin (Kerry politician) =

Irish former politician (born 1982)

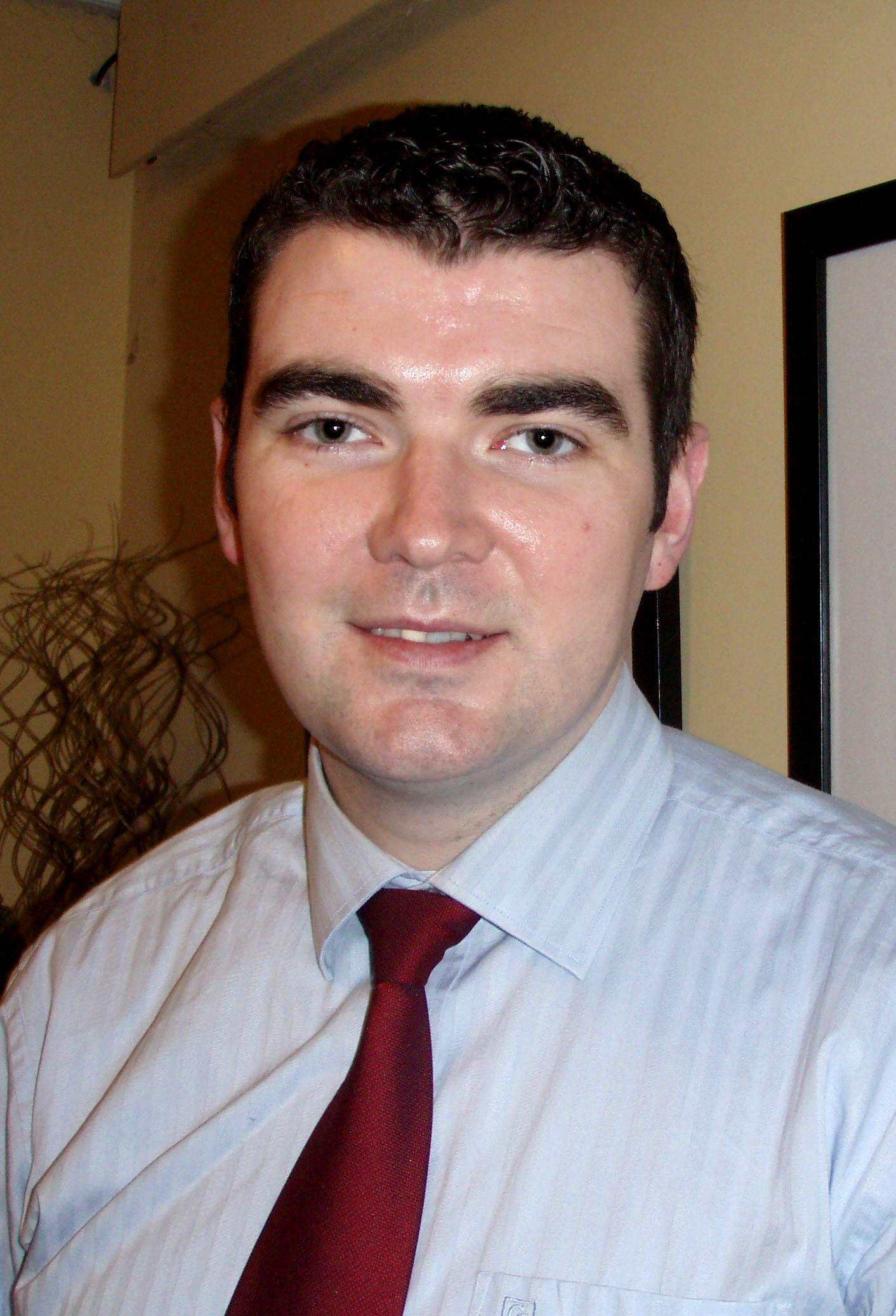
- Griffin in 2012

Deputy Chief Whip
- In office 15 July 2020 – 17 December 2022
- Leader: Jack Chambers

Minister of State
- 2017–2020: Tourism and Sport

Teachta Dála
- In office February 2016 – November 2024
- Constituency: Kerry
- In office February 2011 – February 2016
- Constituency: Kerry South

Personal details
- Born: 14 March 1982 (age 44) Cork, Ireland
- Party: Fine Gael
- Spouse: Róisín Griffin (m. 2010)
- Children: 2
- Education: NUI Galway
- Website: brendangriffin.ie

Brendan Griffin (born 14 March 1982) is an Irish former Fine Gael politician who served as a Teachta Dála (TD) for the Kerry constituency from 2016 to 2024, and from 2011 to 2016 for the Kerry South constituency. He served as Deputy Government chief whip from July 2020 to December 2022 and as Minister of State for Tourism and Sport from 2017 to 2020.

== Political career ==
=== Early political career ===
Griffin attended NUI Galway. Griffin is a former member of Kerry County Council, representing the local electoral area of Dingle from 2009 to 2011.

=== Dáil Éireann ===
In 2011, Griffin was selected on the Fine Gael ticket in Kerry South, along with incumbent TD Tom Sheahan. Griffin topped the poll with 8,808 first preferences votes, over three thousand more than his party colleague who poled 5,674. He was elected to 31st Dáil on the fifth count. He was the subject of controversy for hiring his wife Róisín as his secretarial assistant and his brother Tommy Griffin as his parliamentary assistant. Both these positions were filled without interview and have salaries paid for by the state. In addition, Griffin helped a cousin, Matt Griffin, get his old council seat. He takes half of his TD salary, at first giving the other half directly back to the exchequer and then in 2012 donating the other half of his salary to pay for a third teacher, in a small rural Kerry school.

At the 2016 general election, Fine Gael had a disappointing result nationally, but Brendan Griffin improved his first-preference vote to 9,674, polling third in the combined Kerry constituency. This was the highest vote achieved by any Fine Gael candidate in Munster, as well as being the largest vote a Young Fine Gael candidate secured in Ireland. He was returned to the 32nd Dáil, on the 11th Count, after his government colleagues Jimmy Deenihan and Labour's Arthur Spring were eliminated.

=== Calls for Taoiseach to step down ===
On 11 July 2016, Brendan Griffin spoke to RTÉ News: Six One calling for Taoiseach Enda Kenny to step down as Leader of Fine Gael before the Dáil returned in September. Griffin argued that Fine Gael showed a lack of preparedness for an election in the scenario where it arose. Griffin was not backed by any other TD and a vote of confidence was not held.

=== Minister of State (2017–2020) ===
Shane Ross, the Minister for Transport, Tourism and Sport, had a toxic relationship with his first junior minister, Patrick O'Donovan. When Leo Varadkar took over as Taoiseach in 2017, he asked Ross if he wished for a replacement. Griffin was appointed as Minister of State at the Department of Transport, Tourism and Sport, with responsibility for Tourism and Sport. In his book In Bed with the Blueshirts Ross says that although they had very different positions, Griffin was a problem-solver and as such they worked well together; "His natural diplomacy will make him a superb Minister for Foreign Affairs some day", said Ross.

=== Later political career ===
At the 2020 general election, Griffin was re-elected in Kerry. He was appointed as deputy chief whip on 15 July 2020, and served until December 2022.

In 2022, Griffin called for a ban on all SUVs in the Dublin Bay South constituency, in response to what he described as "hare-brained proposals" regarding climate action.

On 31 January 2023, he announced that he would not contest the next general election.

Political offices
Preceded by Patrick O'Donovan	Minister of State for Tourism and Sport; 2017–2020	Succeeded by Dara Calleary

Dáil	Election	Deputy (Party)	Deputy (Party)	Deputy (Party)
9th	1937	John Flynn (FF)	Frederick Crowley (FF)	Fionán Lynch (FG)
10th	1938	John Flynn (FF)	Frederick Crowley (FF)	Fionán Lynch (FG)
11th	1943	John Healy (FF)	Frederick Crowley (FF)	Fionán Lynch (FG)
12th	1944	John Healy (FF)	Frederick Crowley (FF)	Fionán Lynch (FG)
12th	1944 by-election	John Healy (FF)	Frederick Crowley (FF)	Donal O'Donoghue (FF)
12th	1945 by-election	John Healy (FF)	Honor Crowley (FF)	Donal O'Donoghue (FF)
13th	1948	John Flynn (Ind.)	Honor Crowley (FF)	Patrick Palmer (FG)
14th	1951	John Flynn (Ind.)	Honor Crowley (FF)	Patrick Palmer (FG)
15th	1954	John Flynn (FF)	Honor Crowley (FF)	Patrick Palmer (FG)
16th	1957	John Joe Rice (SF)	Honor Crowley (FF)	Patrick Palmer (FG)
17th	1961	Timothy O'Connor (FF)	Honor Crowley (FF)	Patrick Connor (FG)
18th	1965	Timothy O'Connor (FF)	Honor Crowley (FF)	Patrick Connor (FG)
18th	1966 by-election	Timothy O'Connor (FF)	John O'Leary (FF)	Patrick Connor (FG)
19th	1969	Timothy O'Connor (FF)	John O'Leary (FF)	Michael Begley (FG)
20th	1973	Timothy O'Connor (FF)	John O'Leary (FF)	Michael Begley (FG)
21st	1977	Timothy O'Connor (FF)	John O'Leary (FF)	Michael Begley (FG)
22nd	1981	Michael Moynihan (Lab)	John O'Leary (FF)	Michael Begley (FG)
23rd	1982 (Feb)	Michael Moynihan (Lab)	John O'Leary (FF)	Michael Begley (FG)
24th	1982 (Nov)	Michael Moynihan (Lab)	John O'Leary (FF)	Michael Begley (FG)
25th	1987	John O'Donoghue (Note: O'Donoghue served as Ceann Comhairle in the 30th Dáil from 2007 to 2009.) (FF)	John O'Leary (FF)	Michael Begley (FG)
26th	1989	John O'Donoghue (FF)	John O'Leary (FF)	Michael Moynihan (Lab)
27th	1992	John O'Donoghue (FF)	John O'Leary (FF)	Breeda Moynihan-Cronin (Lab)
28th	1997	John O'Donoghue (FF)	Jackie Healy-Rae (Ind.)	Breeda Moynihan-Cronin (Lab)
29th	2002	John O'Donoghue (FF)	Jackie Healy-Rae (Ind.)	Breeda Moynihan-Cronin (Lab)
30th	2007	John O'Donoghue (FF)	Jackie Healy-Rae (Ind.)	Tom Sheahan (FG)
31st	2011	Tom Fleming (Ind.)	Michael Healy-Rae (Ind.)	Brendan Griffin (FG)
32nd	2016	Constituency abolished. See Kerry		

Dáil	Election	Deputy (Party)	Deputy (Party)	Deputy (Party)	Deputy (Party)	Deputy (Party)	Deputy (Party)	Deputy (Party)
4th	1923	Tom McEllistrim (Rep)	Austin Stack (Rep)	Patrick Cahill (Rep)	Thomas O'Donoghue (Rep)	James Crowley (CnaG)	Fionán Lynch (CnaG)	John O'Sullivan (CnaG)
5th	1927 (Jun)	Tom McEllistrim (FF)	Austin Stack (SF)	William O'Leary (FF)	Thomas O'Reilly (FF)	James Crowley (CnaG)	Fionán Lynch (CnaG)	John O'Sullivan (CnaG)
6th	1927 (Sep)	Tom McEllistrim (FF)	Frederick Crowley (FF)	William O'Leary (FF)	Thomas O'Reilly (FF)	James Crowley (CnaG)	Fionán Lynch (CnaG)	John O'Sullivan (CnaG)
7th	1932	Tom McEllistrim (FF)	Frederick Crowley (FF)	John Flynn (FF)	Thomas O'Reilly (FF)	Eamon Kissane (FF)	Fionán Lynch (CnaG)	John O'Sullivan (CnaG)
8th	1933	Tom McEllistrim (FF)	Frederick Crowley (FF)	John Flynn (FF)	Denis Daly (FF)	Eamon Kissane (FF)	Fionán Lynch (CnaG)	John O'Sullivan (CnaG)
9th	1937	Constituency abolished. See Kerry North and Kerry South						

Dáil	Election	Deputy (Party)	Deputy (Party)	Deputy (Party)	Deputy (Party)	Deputy (Party)
32nd	2016	Martin Ferris (SF)	Michael Healy-Rae (Ind.)	Danny Healy-Rae (Ind.)	John Brassil (FF)	Brendan Griffin (FG)
33rd	2020	Pa Daly (SF)	Michael Healy-Rae (Ind.)	Danny Healy-Rae (Ind.)	Norma Foley (FF)	Brendan Griffin (FG)
34th	2024	Pa Daly (SF)	Michael Healy-Rae (Ind.)	Danny Healy-Rae (Ind.)	Norma Foley (FF)	Michael Cahill (FF)
