= 1944 Kerry South by-election =

By-election to the 12th Dáil

- 10 November 1944
- Turnout: 22,603 (62.9%)
	O'Donoghue	Horan	O'Connell
Nominee	Donal O'Donoghue	Edmund Horan	Eoin O'Connell
Party	Fianna Fáil	Clann na Talmhan	Fine Gael
First preferences	10,986	6,795	4,822
Percentage	48.6%	30.1%	21.3%
Final count	11,771	9,348	–
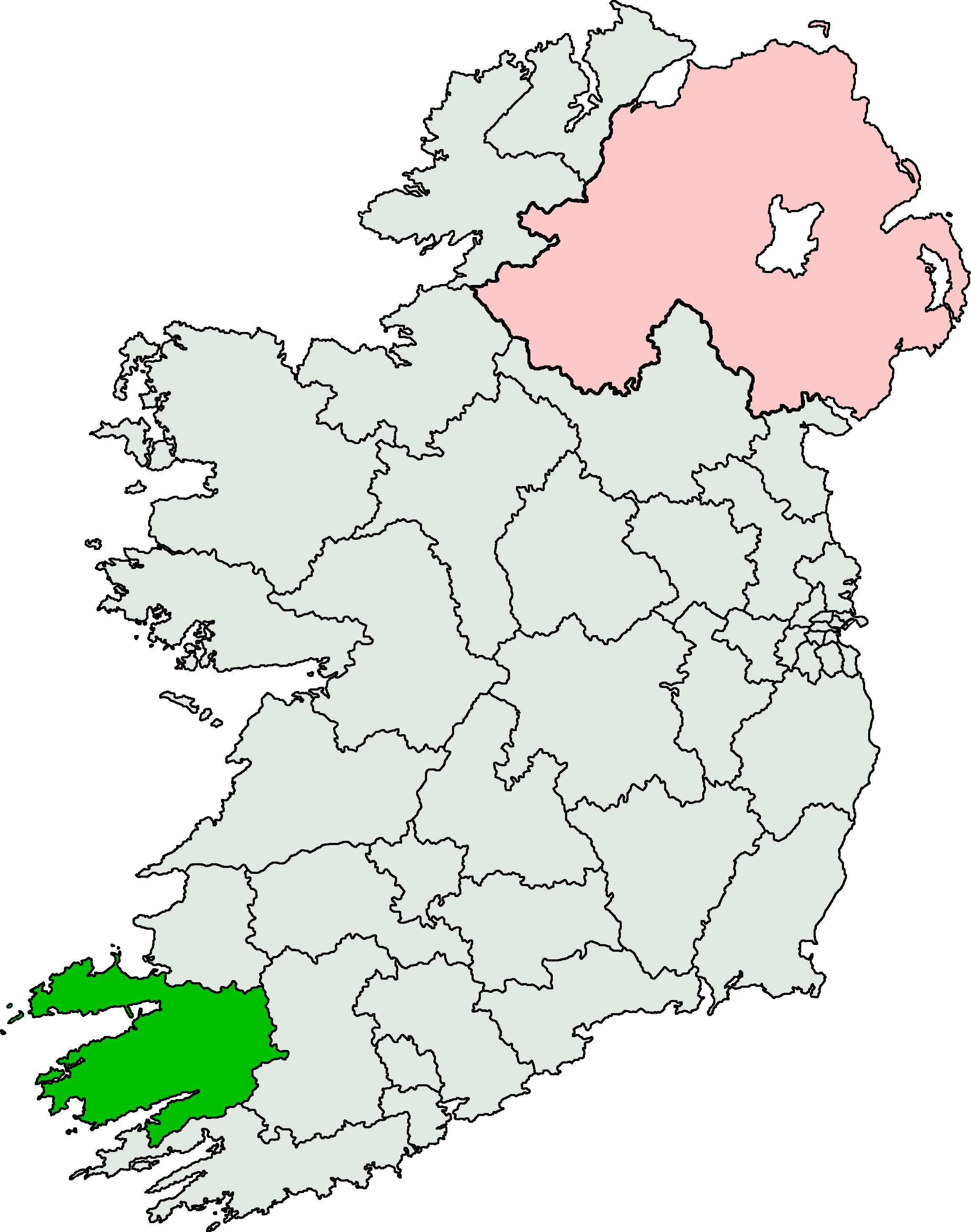
- Kerry South shown within ireland
TD before election
Fionán Lynch
Fine Gael
TD after election
Donal O'Donoghue
Fianna Fáil

A Dáil by-election was held in the constituency of Kerry South in Ireland on Friday, 10 November 1944, to fill a vacancy in the 12th Dáil. It followed the resignation of Fine Gael TD Fionán Lynch on 3 October 1944, after his appointment as a judge of the Circuit Court.

In 1944, Kerry South was a three seat constituency comprising the southern half of County Kerry taking in the Dingle and Iveragh Peninsulas. The writ of election to fill the vacancy was agreed by the Dáil on 19 October 1944.

The by-election was won by the Fianna Fáil candidate Donal O'Donoghue.

O'Donoghue lost his seat at the 1948 general election, and was never subsequently re-elected to the Dáil.

== Result ==
1944 Kerry South by-election
Party	Candidate	FPv%	Count	
Party	Candidate	FPv%	1	2
Fianna Fáil	Donal O'Donoghue	48.6	10,986	11,771
Clann na Talmhan	Edmund Horan	30.1	6,795	9,348
Fine Gael	Eoin O'Connell	21.3	4,822	
Electorate: 35,940 Valid: 22,603 Quota: 11,302 Turnout: 62.9%
