= Tom Sheahan =

Irish former politician (born 1968)

Senator
- In office 25 May 2011 – 8 June 2016
- Constituency: Administrative Panel

Teachta Dála
- In office May 2007 – February 2011
- Constituency: Kerry South

Personal details
- Born: 5 September 1968 (age 57) Killarney, County Kerry, Ireland
- Party: Fine Gael

Tom Sheahan (born 5 September 1968) is an Irish former Fine Gael politician who served as a Senator for the Administrative Panel from 2011 to 2016 and a Teachta Dála (TD) for the Kerry South constituency from 2007 to 2011.

He was elected to the 30th Dáil at the 2007 general election. He was elected to Kerry County Council for the Killarney local electoral area following the 2004 local elections.

He was the Fine Gael deputy spokesperson on Agriculture, with special responsibility for Forestry from October 2010 to March 2011. Previously, he served as deputy spokesperson on Agriculture, with special responsibility for Fisheries from 2007 to 2010.

He is a member of the Kerry Mental Health Association, Rathmore Community Council and Rathmore GAA Club.

He lost his seat at the 2011 general election to party colleague Brendan Griffin. He was subsequently elected to Seanad Éireann as a Senator for the Administrative Panel in April 2011. He was the Fine Gael Seanad Spokesperson on Public Expenditure and Reform.

In September 2012, he made remarks in the Seanad in which he referred to the accidental death of a Garda and claimed a Sinn Féin member had allegedly said "they would have done a much cleaner job". His comments were criticised by the Garda Representatives Association, and by the Sinn Féin Kerry North TD Martin Ferris, who challenged Sheahan to name the person.

In 2014, Sheahan made "anti-Traveller" comments which sparked a controversy in County Kerry. He later denied the misinterpretation of his comment and clarified his stance on the matter of Irish Travellers and Roma communities.

He was an unsuccessful candidate at the 2020 Seanad election.

Dáil	Election	Deputy (Party)	Deputy (Party)	Deputy (Party)
9th	1937	John Flynn (FF)	Frederick Crowley (FF)	Fionán Lynch (FG)
10th	1938	John Flynn (FF)	Frederick Crowley (FF)	Fionán Lynch (FG)
11th	1943	John Healy (FF)	Frederick Crowley (FF)	Fionán Lynch (FG)
12th	1944	John Healy (FF)	Frederick Crowley (FF)	Fionán Lynch (FG)
12th	1944 by-election	John Healy (FF)	Frederick Crowley (FF)	Donal O'Donoghue (FF)
12th	1945 by-election	John Healy (FF)	Honor Crowley (FF)	Donal O'Donoghue (FF)
13th	1948	John Flynn (Ind.)	Honor Crowley (FF)	Patrick Palmer (FG)
14th	1951	John Flynn (Ind.)	Honor Crowley (FF)	Patrick Palmer (FG)
15th	1954	John Flynn (FF)	Honor Crowley (FF)	Patrick Palmer (FG)
16th	1957	John Joe Rice (SF)	Honor Crowley (FF)	Patrick Palmer (FG)
17th	1961	Timothy O'Connor (FF)	Honor Crowley (FF)	Patrick Connor (FG)
18th	1965	Timothy O'Connor (FF)	Honor Crowley (FF)	Patrick Connor (FG)
18th	1966 by-election	Timothy O'Connor (FF)	John O'Leary (FF)	Patrick Connor (FG)
19th	1969	Timothy O'Connor (FF)	John O'Leary (FF)	Michael Begley (FG)
20th	1973	Timothy O'Connor (FF)	John O'Leary (FF)	Michael Begley (FG)
21st	1977	Timothy O'Connor (FF)	John O'Leary (FF)	Michael Begley (FG)
22nd	1981	Michael Moynihan (Lab)	John O'Leary (FF)	Michael Begley (FG)
23rd	1982 (Feb)	Michael Moynihan (Lab)	John O'Leary (FF)	Michael Begley (FG)
24th	1982 (Nov)	Michael Moynihan (Lab)	John O'Leary (FF)	Michael Begley (FG)
25th	1987	John O'Donoghue (Note: O'Donoghue served as Ceann Comhairle in the 30th Dáil from 2007 to 2009.) (FF)	John O'Leary (FF)	Michael Begley (FG)
26th	1989	John O'Donoghue (FF)	John O'Leary (FF)	Michael Moynihan (Lab)
27th	1992	John O'Donoghue (FF)	John O'Leary (FF)	Breeda Moynihan-Cronin (Lab)
28th	1997	John O'Donoghue (FF)	Jackie Healy-Rae (Ind.)	Breeda Moynihan-Cronin (Lab)
29th	2002	John O'Donoghue (FF)	Jackie Healy-Rae (Ind.)	Breeda Moynihan-Cronin (Lab)
30th	2007	John O'Donoghue (FF)	Jackie Healy-Rae (Ind.)	Tom Sheahan (FG)
31st	2011	Tom Fleming (Ind.)	Michael Healy-Rae (Ind.)	Brendan Griffin (FG)
32nd	2016	Constituency abolished. See Kerry		
