= Kerry South (Dáil constituency) =

Dáil constituency (1937–2016)

- Former Dáil constituency
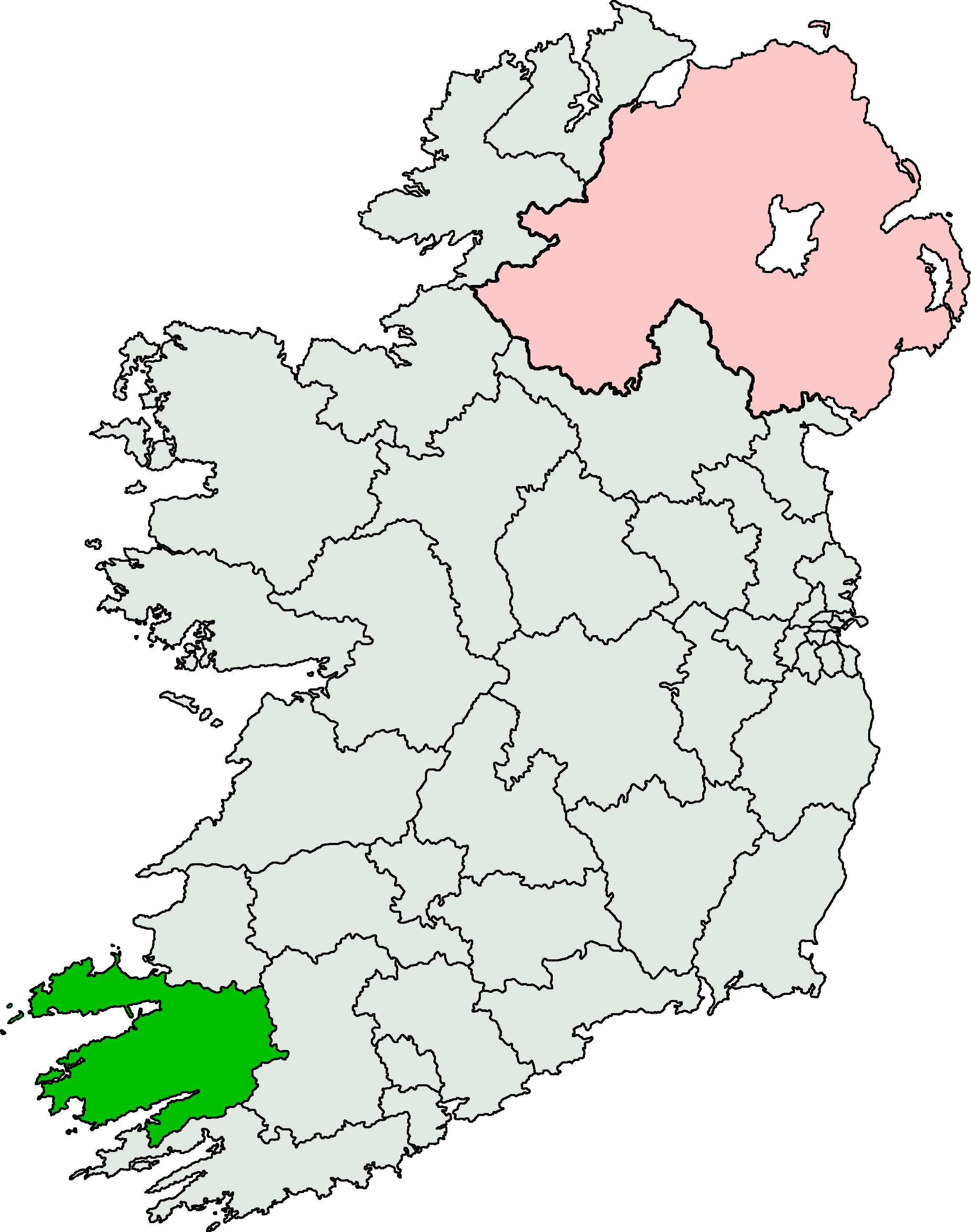
- Location of Kerry South within Ireland

Former constituency
- Created: 1937
- Abolished: 2016
- Seats: 3
- Local government area: County Kerry
- Created from: Kerry
- Replaced by: Kerry

Kerry South was a parliamentary constituency represented in Dáil Éireann, the lower house of the Irish parliament or Oireachtas, from 1937 to 2016. The constituency elected 3 deputies (Teachtaí Dála, commonly known as TDs). The method of election was proportional representation by means of the single transferable vote (PR-STV).

== History and boundaries ==
The constituency was located in the southern half of County Kerry taking in the Dingle and Iveragh peninsulas, including the towns of Killarney, Dingle, Cahirciveen, Killorglin and Kenmare.

It was established by the Electoral (Revision of Constituencies) Act 1935 when the former Kerry constituency was divided into the constituencies of Kerry North and Kerry South. It was first used at the 1937 general election for the 9th Dáil.

The Electoral (Amendment) Act 2009 defined the constituency as:

"The county of Kerry, except the part thereof which is comprised in the constituency of Kerry North–West Limerick."

It was abolished at the 2016 general election and replaced by the new Kerry constituency.

== TDs ==
Teachtaí Dála (TDs) for Kerry South 1937–2016
Key to parties: FF = Fianna Fáil; FG = Fine Gael; Ind. = Independent; Lab = Labour; SF = Sinn Féin
Dáil	Election	Deputy (Party)	Deputy (Party)	Deputy (Party)
9th	1937	John Flynn (FF)	Frederick Crowley (FF)	Fionán Lynch (FG)
10th	1938	John Flynn (FF)	Frederick Crowley (FF)	Fionán Lynch (FG)
11th	1943	John Healy (FF)	Frederick Crowley (FF)	Fionán Lynch (FG)
12th	1944	John Healy (FF)	Frederick Crowley (FF)	Fionán Lynch (FG)
12th	1944 by-election	John Healy (FF)	Frederick Crowley (FF)	Donal O'Donoghue (FF)
12th	1945 by-election	John Healy (FF)	Honor Crowley (FF)	Donal O'Donoghue (FF)
13th	1948	John Flynn (Ind.)	Honor Crowley (FF)	Patrick Palmer (FG)
14th	1951	John Flynn (Ind.)	Honor Crowley (FF)	Patrick Palmer (FG)
15th	1954	John Flynn (FF)	Honor Crowley (FF)	Patrick Palmer (FG)
16th	1957	John Joe Rice (SF)	Honor Crowley (FF)	Patrick Palmer (FG)
17th	1961	Timothy O'Connor (FF)	Honor Crowley (FF)	Patrick Connor (FG)
18th	1965	Timothy O'Connor (FF)	Honor Crowley (FF)	Patrick Connor (FG)
18th	1966 by-election	Timothy O'Connor (FF)	John O'Leary (FF)	Patrick Connor (FG)
19th	1969	Timothy O'Connor (FF)	John O'Leary (FF)	Michael Begley (FG)
20th	1973	Timothy O'Connor (FF)	John O'Leary (FF)	Michael Begley (FG)
21st	1977	Timothy O'Connor (FF)	John O'Leary (FF)	Michael Begley (FG)
22nd	1981	Michael Moynihan (Lab)	John O'Leary (FF)	Michael Begley (FG)
23rd	1982 (Feb)	Michael Moynihan (Lab)	John O'Leary (FF)	Michael Begley (FG)
24th	1982 (Nov)	Michael Moynihan (Lab)	John O'Leary (FF)	Michael Begley (FG)
25th	1987	John O'Donoghue (Note: O'Donoghue served as Ceann Comhairle in the 30th Dáil from 2007 to 2009.) (FF)	John O'Leary (FF)	Michael Begley (FG)
26th	1989	John O'Donoghue (FF)	John O'Leary (FF)	Michael Moynihan (Lab)
27th	1992	John O'Donoghue (FF)	John O'Leary (FF)	Breeda Moynihan-Cronin (Lab)
28th	1997	John O'Donoghue (FF)	Jackie Healy-Rae (Ind.)	Breeda Moynihan-Cronin (Lab)
29th	2002	John O'Donoghue (FF)	Jackie Healy-Rae (Ind.)	Breeda Moynihan-Cronin (Lab)
30th	2007	John O'Donoghue (FF)	Jackie Healy-Rae (Ind.)	Tom Sheahan (FG)
31st	2011	Tom Fleming (Ind.)	Michael Healy-Rae (Ind.)	Brendan Griffin (FG)
32nd	2016	Constituency abolished. See Kerry		

Note: The columns in this table are used only for presentational purposes, and no significance should be attached to the order of columns. For details of the order in which seats were won at each election, see the detailed results of that election.

== Elections ==
*: Outgoing TD

=== 2011 general election ===
2011 general election: Kerry South
Party	Candidate	FPv%	Count					
Party	Candidate	FPv%	1	2	3	4	5	6
Fine Gael	Brendan Griffin	19.8	8,808	8,943	10,014	10,865	12,636	
Independent	Michael Healy-Rae	15.0	6,670	6,789	7,412	9,146	10,129	10,326
Independent	Tom Fleming	14.5	6,416	6,548	7,357	8,746	10,389	10,697
Fianna Fáil	John O'Donoghue	13.3	5,917	5,960	6,200			
Fine Gael	Tom Sheahan	12.8	5,674	5,736	6,577	7,326	8,668	9,409
SKIA	Michael Gleeson	11.1	4,939	5,222	6,378	7,037		
Labour	Marie Moloney	11.1	4,926	5,132				
Green	Oonagh Comerford	0.9	401					
Independent	Richard Behal	0.8	348					
Independent	Dermot Finn	0.6	281					
Electorate: 59,629 Valid: 44,380 Spoilt: 299 (0.7%) Quota: 11,096 Turnout: 44,679 (74.9%)

=== 2007 general election ===
2007 general election: Kerry South
Party	Candidate	FPv%	Count					
Party	Candidate	FPv%	1	2	3	4	5	6
Fianna Fáil	John O'Donoghue	23.4	9,128	9,407	9,956			
Fianna Fáil	Tom Fleming	17.3	6,740	6,972	7,221	7,278	8,393	8,855
Independent	Jackie Healy-Rae	15.4	5,993	6,356	6,828	6,882	8,526	9,315
Fine Gael	Tom Sheahan	14.3	5,600	5,819	7,927	7,960	11,010	
Labour	Breeda Moynihan-Cronin	13.5	5,263	5,904	6,774	6,827		
Fine Gael	Séamus Cosaí FitzGerald	10.7	4,195	4,419				
Sinn Féin	Lynn Ní Bhaoigheallain	3.5	1,375					
Green	John Hickey	1.9	738					
Electorate: 53,660 Valid: 39,032 Spoilt: 293 (0.8%) Quota: 9,759 Turnout: 39,325 (73.3%)

=== 2002 general election ===
2002 general election: Kerry South
Party	Candidate	FPv%	Count						
Party	Candidate	FPv%	1	2	3	4	5	6	7
Fianna Fáil	John O'Donoghue	25.8	9,445						
Fianna Fáil	Tom Fleming	18.9	6,912	6,995	7,255	7,407	7,593	8,276	8,381
Independent	Jackie Healy-Rae	17.0	6,229	6,455	6,819	6,893	7,147	8,409	8,584
Labour	Breeda Moynihan-Cronin	14.5	5,307	5,480	5,946	5,979	6,432	9,442	
Fine Gael	Séamus Cosaí FitzGerald	12.4	4,539	4,732	4,791	4,811	6,083		
Fine Gael	Sheila Casey	5.3	1,934	2,033	2,216	2,220			
Independent	Donal Grady	3.7	1,346	1,449					
Independent	Donal Barry	2.5	934						
Electorate: 51,761 Valid: 36,646 Spoilt: 376 (1.0%) Quota: 9,162 Turnout: 37,022 (61.0%)

=== 1997 general election ===
1997 general election: Kerry South
Party	Candidate	FPv%	Count						
Party	Candidate	FPv%	1	2	3	4	5	6	7
Independent	Jackie Healy-Rae	20.3	7,220	7,563	8,131	8,318	9,163		
Fianna Fáil	John O'Donoghue	20.3	7,204	7,280	7,408	7,487	10,346		
Labour	Breeda Moynihan-Cronin	14.1	4,988	5,265	5,550	5,898	6,250	6,706	9,960
Independent	Breandan MacGearailt	11.8	4,172	4,265	4,402	4,547	4,686	5,332	5,975
Fianna Fáil	Brian O'Leary	11.5	4,079	4,248	4,464	4,493			
Fine Gael	Aidan O'Connor	8.6	3,041	3,204	3,353	4,578	4,729	4,904	
Fine Gael	Jim Kelly	5.2	1,847	1,928	2,060				
Independent	P. J. Cronin	4.4	1,557	1,717					
SKIA	Michael Gleeson	3.9	1,388						
Electorate: 48,164 Valid: 35,496 Spoilt: 303 (0.9%) Quota: 8,875 Turnout: 35,799 (74.3%)

=== 1992 general election ===
1992 general election: Kerry South
Party	Candidate	FPv%	Count					
Party	Candidate	FPv%	1	2	3	4	5	6
Fianna Fáil	John O'Donoghue	26.4	8,263					
Labour	Breeda Moynihan-Cronin	24.1	7,537	7,613	7,649	7,747	7,843	
Fianna Fáil	John O'Leary	19.5	6,113	6,407	6,420	6,470	6,535	7,407
Fine Gael	Michael Connor-Scarteen	11.4	3,576	3,601	3,617	3,640	3,660	4,030
Fine Gael	Paul Coghlan	8.5	2,658	2,668	2,682	2,706	2,715	3,274
Independent	P. J. Cronin	7.9	2,481	2,497	2,518	2,549	2,625	
Sinn Féin	Dan Daly	1.1	331	333	335	353		
Independent	Pól O'Críocháin	0.9	267	270	277			
Independent	Liam West	0.4	112	114				
Electorate: 44,591 Valid: 31,338 Spoilt: 486 (1.5%) Quota: 7,835 Turnout: 31,824 (71.4%)

=== 1989 general election ===
1989 general election: Kerry South
Party	Candidate	FPv%	Count				
Party	Candidate	FPv%	1	2	3	4	5
Fianna Fáil	John O'Leary	26.8	8,398				
Fianna Fáil	John O'Donoghue	26.7	8,375				
Fine Gael	Michael Begley	20.7	6,477	6,503	7,103	7,226	7,412
Labour	Michael Moynihan	20.5	6,408	6,468	7,125	7,570	7,929
Progressive Democrats	John Kelly	4.7	1,458	1,494			
Independent	Barbara Hyland	0.6	202				
Electorate: 43,159 Valid: 31,318 Quota: 7,830 Turnout: 72.6%

=== 1987 general election ===
1987 general election: Kerry South
Party	Candidate	FPv%	Count							
Party	Candidate	FPv%	1	2	3	4	5	6	7	8
Fianna Fáil	John O'Leary	23.6	7,839	7,857	7,929	8,139	8,175	8,669		
Fianna Fáil	John O'Donoghue	16.9	5,606	5,613	5,646	5,687	5,733	6,171	9,212	
Fine Gael	Michael Begley	15.2	5,036	5,057	5,112	5,157	5,791	6,952	7,849	8,199
Labour	Michael Moynihan	13.7	4,559	4,581	4,705	4,971	5,074	6,055	6,580	6,945
Fianna Fáil	Breandan Mac Gearailt	13.5	4,481	4,489	4,571	4,637	4,652	4,947		
Progressive Democrats	Michael C. Ahern	9.7	3,215	3,233	3,371	3,534	3,654			
Fine Gael	Denis Sheahan	2.7	910	914	939	975				
Workers' Party	Seán O'Grady	2.2	735	741	898					
Green	Marcus Counihan	2.1	708	721						
Independent	James Falvey	0.4	122							
Electorate: 42,701 Valid: 33,211 Quota: 8,303 Turnout: 77.8%

=== November 1982 general election ===
November 1982 general election: Kerry South
Party	Candidate	FPv%	Count							
Party	Candidate	FPv%	1	2	3	4	5	6	7	8
Fianna Fáil	John O'Leary	24.0	7,898	7,900	7,937	8,088	8,143	8,148	8,154	8,303
Labour	Michael Moynihan	23.1	7,609	7,620	7,690	8,052	8,247			
Fine Gael	Michael Begley	22.8	7,524	7,532	7,556	7,613	8,252			
Fianna Fáil	John O'Donoghue	21.9	7,201	7,215	7,232	7,282	7,298	7,300	7,302	7,715
Fine Gael	Tom Randles	2.7	890	893	908	927				
Independent	Joseph O'Shea	2.6	845	850	874	929	941	951	955	
Workers' Party	Seán O'Grady	2.1	679	687	729					
Independent	Colm O'Sullivan	0.7	236	238						
Independent	Stephen Doyle	0.2	57							
Electorate: 41,941 Valid: 32,939 Quota: 8,235 Turnout: 78.5%

=== February 1982 general election ===
February 1982 general election: Kerry South
Party	Candidate	FPv%	Count				
Party	Candidate	FPv%	1	2	3	4	5
Fianna Fáil	John O'Leary	23.1	7,510	7,515	7,758	7,764	8,811
Labour	Michael Moynihan	21.6	7,038	7,077	7,732	7,877	8,285
Fine Gael	Michael Begley	20.8	6,758	6,770	8,292		
Fianna Fáil	John O'Donoghue	15.3	4,977	4,999	5,100	5,105	7,094
Fianna Fáil	Tom Fitzgerald	10.8	3,523	3,544	3,582	3,585	
Fine Gael	Michael Connor Scarteen	7.9	2,584	2,599			
Independent	Stephen Doyle	0.4	141				
Electorate: 41,807 Valid: 32,531 (77.8%) Spoilt: 279 (0.9%) Quota: 8,133 Turnout: 32,810 (78.5%)

=== 1981 general election ===
1981 general election: Kerry South
Party	Candidate	FPv%	Count			
Party	Candidate	FPv%	1	2	3	4
Labour	Michael Moynihan	24.5	8,221	8,624		
Fianna Fáil	John O'Leary	22.0	7,383	7,550	7,757	9,036
Fine Gael	Michael Begley	18.3	6,144	6,401	7,741	8,195
Fianna Fáil	Timothy O'Connor	14.0	4,702	4,888	4,980	6,904
Fianna Fáil	John O'Donoghue	11.3	3,780	4,150	4,248	
Fine Gael	Patrick O'Connor	5.3	1,763	1,892		
Independent	Michael O'Connell	4.8	1,600			
Electorate: 41,807 Valid: 33,593 Quota: 8,399 Turnout: 80.4%

=== 1977 general election ===
1977 general election: Kerry South
Party	Candidate	FPv%	Count		
Party	Candidate	FPv%	1	2	3
Fianna Fáil	John O'Leary	24.5	8,002	8,246	
Fianna Fáil	Timothy O'Connor	24.2	7,917	8,072	8,312
Fine Gael	Michael Begley	20.4	6,655	6,722	8,818
Labour	Michael Moynihan	17.7	5,799	6,174	6,982
Fine Gael	Michael Connor-Scarteen	10.0	3,256	3,345	
Sinn Féin The Workers' Party	Redmond Sullivan	3.3	1,065		
Electorate: 41,565 Valid: 32,694 Quota: 8,174 Turnout: 78.7%

=== 1973 general election ===
1973 general election: Kerry South
Party	Candidate	FPv%	Count			
Party	Candidate	FPv%	1	2	3	4
Fianna Fáil	John O'Leary	30.3	8,286			
Fianna Fáil	Timothy O'Connor	21.3	5,819	7,021		
Fine Gael	Michael Begley	19.7	5,390	5,444	5,610	7,752
Labour	Michael Moynihan	13.9	3,806	3,952	4,451	5,087
Fine Gael	Daniel Barry	11.1	3,025	3,052	3,145	
Sinn Féin	Patrick O'Callaghan	3.7	1,014	1,035		
Electorate: 36,391 Valid: 27,340 Quota: 6,836 Turnout: 75.1%

=== 1969 general election ===
1969 general election: Kerry South
Party	Candidate	FPv%	Count				
Party	Candidate	FPv%	1	2	3	4	5
Fianna Fáil	John O'Leary	30.6	8,656				
Fianna Fáil	Timothy O'Connor	22.9	6,490	7,733			
Fine Gael	Michael Begley	16.1	4,564	4,621	4,666	5,629	6,713
Fine Gael	Patrick Connor	13.8	3,891	4,013	4,151	4,884	5,698
Labour	Tadhg O'Sullivan	9.4	2,652	2,795	2,945	3,109	
Fine Gael	Daniel Barry	7.2	2,038	2,056	2,065		
Electorate: 36,097 Valid: 28,291 Quota: 7,073 Turnout: 78.4%

=== 1966 by-election ===
Following the death of Fianna Fáil TD Honor Crowley, a by-election was held on 7 December 1966. The seat was won by the Fianna Fáil candidate John O'Leary.

1966 by-election: Kerry South
Party	Candidate	FPv%	Count	
Party	Candidate	FPv%	1	2
Fianna Fáil	John O'Leary	45.9	12,499	13,590
Fine Gael	Michael Begley	36.3	9,875	12,807
Labour	Michael Moynihan	17.8	4,849	
Electorate: 35,832 Valid: 27,223 Quota: 13,612 Turnout: 76.0%

=== 1965 general election ===
1965 general election: Kerry South
Party	Candidate	FPv%	Count				
Party	Candidate	FPv%	1	2	3	4	5
Fianna Fáil	Timothy O'Connor	22.5	5,977	6,253	6,842		
Fianna Fáil	Honor Crowley	21.6	5,746	5,887	6,084	6,225	6,341
Fine Gael	Patrick Connor	20.7	5,501	5,664	7,365		
Labour	Michael Moynihan	17.7	4,712	4,924	5,626	6,210	6,296
Fine Gael	Michael Begley	12.2	3,250	3,725			
Independent	James Courtney	5.2	1,370				
Electorate: 36,470 Valid: 26,556 Quota: 6,640 Turnout: 72.8%

=== 1961 general election ===
1961 general election: Kerry South
Party	Candidate	FPv%	Count		
Party	Candidate	FPv%	1	2	3
Fianna Fáil	Honor Crowley	22.3	5,640	5,886	6,537
Fine Gael	Patrick Connor	21.3	5,402	6,588	
Fianna Fáil	Timothy O'Connor	20.7	5,244	5,446	5,862
Labour	Michael Moynihan	14.3	3,630	3,952	5,073
Sinn Féin	John Joe Rice	12.8	3,240	3,380	
Fine Gael	Michael O'Sullivan	8.5	2,158		
Electorate: 36,781 Valid: 25,314 Quota: 6,329 Turnout: 68.8%

=== 1957 general election ===
1957 general election: Kerry South
Party	Candidate	FPv%	Count
Party	Candidate	FPv%	1
Fine Gael	Patrick Palmer	26.6	5,899
Fianna Fáil	Honor Crowley	25.4	5,632
Sinn Féin	John Joe Rice	25.1	5,582
Fianna Fáil	John Flynn	23.0	5,101
Electorate: 32,279 Valid: 22,214 Quota: 5,554 Turnout: 68.8%

=== 1954 general election ===
1954 general election: Kerry South
Party	Candidate	FPv%	Count			
Party	Candidate	FPv%	1	2	3	4
Fine Gael	Patrick Palmer	25.6	6,376			
Fianna Fáil	John Flynn	23.4	5,834	5,844	6,002	6,429
Fianna Fáil	Honor Crowley	23.0	5,732	5,740	5,946	6,380
Labour	Michael Moynihan	10.8	2,690	2,732	3,513	5,025
Clann na Talmhan	William Dennehy	9.9	2,461	2,499	3,112	
Clann na Poblachta	John O'Leary	7.4	1,853	1,894		
Electorate: 33,411 Valid: 24,946 Quota: 6,237 Turnout: 74.7%

=== 1951 general election ===
1951 general election: Kerry South
Party	Candidate	FPv%	Count				
Party	Candidate	FPv%	1	2	3	4	5
Fine Gael	Patrick Palmer	29.5	7,437				
Independent	John Flynn	21.2	5,337	5,614	6,023	7,521	
Fianna Fáil	Honor Crowley	18.6	4,679	4,739	4,772	5,236	5,438
Fianna Fáil	Patrick J. Lane	16.8	4,232	4,312	4,405	4,555	4,648
Clann na Poblachta	John Joe O'Leary	9.3	2,330	2,723	3,579		
Clann na Poblachta	Jeremiah O'Riordan	4.7	1,170	1,500			
Electorate: 33,680 Valid: 25,185 Quota: 6,297 Turnout: 74.8%

=== 1948 general election ===
1948 general election: Kerry South
Party	Candidate	FPv%	Count					
Party	Candidate	FPv%	1	2	3	4	5	6
Fine Gael	Patrick Palmer	18.9	4,924	5,400	5,548	5,689	6,059	6,161
Independent	John Flynn	15.7	4,107	4,374	4,767	4,920	6,473	6,944
Fianna Fáil	Honor Crowley	15.7	4,091	4,244	4,274	5,973	7,900	
Fianna Fáil	John Healy	15.3	3,992	4,033	4,164	4,398		
Clann na Poblachta	Pádraig O'Donoghue	12.2	3,179	3,468	4,791	4,935	5,079	5,115
Fianna Fáil	Donal O'Donoghue	8.7	2,278	2,357	2,462			
Clann na Poblachta	Patrick Jones	8.1	2,121	2,183				
Independent	Patrick J. O'Shea	5.5	1,424					
Electorate: 35,580 Valid: 26,116 Quota: 6,530 Turnout: 73.4%

=== 1945 by-election ===
Following the death of Fianna Fáil TD Frederick Crowley, a by-election was held on 4 December 1945. The seat was won by the Fianna Fáil candidate Honor Crowley, widow of the deceased TD.

1945 by-election: Kerry South
Party	Candidate	FPv%	Count
Party	Candidate	FPv%	1
Fianna Fáil	Honor Crowley	56.7	10,483
Clann na Talmhan	Edmund Horan	43.3	8,018
Electorate: 36,029 Valid: 18,501 Quota: 9,251 Turnout: 51.4%

=== 1944 by-election ===
Following the resignation of Fine Gael TD Fionán Lynch upon his appointment as a judge, a by-election was held on 10 November 1944. The seat was won by the Fianna Fáil candidate Donal O'Donoghue.

1944 by-election: Kerry South
Party	Candidate	FPv%	Count	
Party	Candidate	FPv%	1	2
Fianna Fáil	Donal O'Donoghue	48.6	10,986	11,771
Clann na Talmhan	Edmund Horan	30.1	6,795	9,348
Fine Gael	Eoin O'Connell	21.3	4,822	
Electorate: 35,940 Valid: 22,603 Quota: 11,302 Turnout: 62.9%

=== 1944 general election ===
1944 general election: Kerry South
Party	Candidate	FPv%	Count		
Party	Candidate	FPv%	1	2	3
Fianna Fáil	Frederick Crowley	26.6	6,693		
Fianna Fáil	John Healy	25.9	6,526		
Fine Gael	Fionán Lynch	24.1	6,057	6,232	6,344
Clann na Talmhan	Edmund Horan	23.5	5,908	6,129	6,246
Electorate: 36,504 Valid: 25,184 Quota: 6,297 Turnout: 69.0%

=== 1943 general election ===
1943 general election: Kerry South
Party	Candidate	FPv%	Count			
Party	Candidate	FPv%	1	2	3	4
Fianna Fáil	Frederick Crowley	22.4	5,934	5,994	7,144	
Fianna Fáil	John Healy	20.1	5,323	5,604	6,200	6,442
Fine Gael	Fionán Lynch	18.0	4,771	5,034	6,418	6,579
Clann na Talmhan	Daniel Allman	16.8	4,446	5,366	6,161	6,266
Labour	William Myers	16.5	4,384	4,509		
Clann na Talmhan	John Duffy	6.3	1,685			
Electorate: 36,504 Valid: 26,543 Quota: 6,636 Turnout: 72.7%

=== 1938 general election ===
1938 general election: Kerry South (uncontested)
Party	Candidate
Fianna Fáil	Frederick Crowley
Fianna Fáil	John Flynn
Fine Gael	Fionán Lynch
Electorate: 35,027

=== 1937 general election ===
1937 general election: Kerry South
Party	Candidate	FPv%	Count			
Party	Candidate	FPv%	1	2	3	4
Fianna Fáil	John Flynn	28.3	7,268			
Fianna Fáil	Frederick Crowley	26.4	6,772			
Fine Gael	Fionán Lynch	18.4	4,741	4,955	5,009	7,252
Independent	Patrick O'Shea	13.7	3,532	4,104	4,338	5,394
Fine Gael	William O'Sullivan	13.2	3,384	3,441	3,500	
Electorate: 35,390 Valid: 25,697 Quota: 6,425 Turnout: 72.6%

== See also ==
- Dáil constituencies
- Politics of the Republic of Ireland
- Historic Dáil constituencies
- Elections in the Republic of Ireland
