= Paddy O'Callaghan =

Irish racing cyclist and politician

Kerry County Counciller
- In office 1967 – early 1970s
- Constituency: Killorglin

Personal details
- Born: 1933 Aglish, Ballyhar, County Kerry, Ireland
- Died: 15 August 2014 (aged 80–81) Cromane, County Kerry, Ireland
- Resting place: Reilig Realt na Mara, Cromane, County Kerry
- Party: Workers' Party (from 1969); Sinn Féin (until 1969)

Paddy O'Callaghan (1933 – 15 August 2014) was a former Irish amateur cycling champion and a one-time Official Sinn Féin member of Kerry County Council. He was a second cousin of former United States vice-president Dick Cheney but differed strongly with his political point of view being a member of the Workers' Party for many years.

O'Callaghan was born in the Aglish area of Ballyhar near Cromane, County Kerry in 1933. As a youth he became active in the National Athletic & Cultural Association of Ireland (NACAI, now known as Cycling Ireland) and particularly in the sport of cycling. In 1956 he won the Irish Cycling Championship taking the 100mile Time Trial in 1956 with a time of 4 hours and 27 minutes. In more recent years he has been involved with the FBD Rás cycling competition.

At the time one of the NACAI's most prominent members and a national cycling champion was Dublin born Joe Christle who was also an active member of the Irish Republican Army. Under Christle's influence O'Callaghan joined the Irish republican movement however he remained a member when Christle was dismissed from the movement in the mid-1950s for taking unofficial action against British forces in Northern Ireland.

Paddy O'Callaghan became a member of the Ard Comhairle (national executive) of Sinn Féin in the early 1960s and was close to the leadership of President Tomás Mac Giolla and IRA Chief of Staff Cathal Goulding. When the movement split in 1969/70 O'Callaghan remained loyal to the Goulding leadership and was influential in swaying the majority of his South Kerry comrades in the IRA and Sinn Féin to remain in the movement.

He was also active in local community development issues in the South Kerry area and was a founding member of both Killorglin Credit Union and Kerry Mountain Rescue.

In the 1967 local elections O'Callaghan was elected for Sinn Féin in the Killorglin ward.

In the early 1970s O'Callaghan was elected to Kerry County Council representing Official Sinn Féin. He also contested a number of general elections in the Kerry South constituency and was a substitute candidate under the list system for the party in a number of elections to the European Parliament.

For many years he also operated a bicycle sale and hire shop in Killarney.

O'Callaghan remained active as an adjudicator and commentator in cycling and as a member South Kerry Development Partnership and several other initiatives until his death.

Paddy O'Callaghan died on 15 August 2014 at his home in Cromane, County Kerry.
