= John O'Donoghue (politician) =

Irish former politician (born 1956)

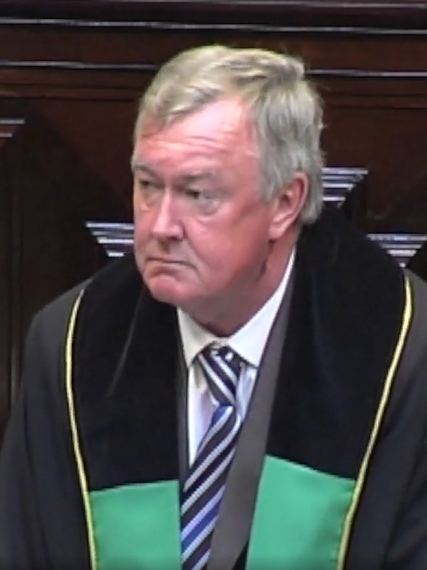
- O'Donoghue in 2007

Ceann Comhairle of Dáil Éireann
- In office 14 June 2007 – 13 October 2009
- Deputy: Brendan Howlin
- Preceded by: Rory O'Hanlon
- Succeeded by: Séamus Kirk

Minister for Arts, Sport and Tourism
- In office 6 June 2002 – 14 June 2007
- Taoiseach: Bertie Ahern
- Preceded by: Jim McDaid
- Succeeded by: Séamus Brennan

Minister for Justice, Equality and Law Reform
- In office 26 June 1997 – 6 June 2002
- Taoiseach: Bertie Ahern
- Preceded by: Nora Owen
- Succeeded by: Michael McDowell

Minister of State
- 1991–1992: Finance

Teachta Dála
- In office February 1987 – February 2011
- Constituency: Kerry South

Personal details
- Born: 28 May 1956 (age 70) Cork, Ireland
- Party: Fianna Fáil
- Spouse: Kate Ann Murphy (m. 1985)
- Children: 3
- Relatives: Michael Pat Murphy (father-in-law)
- Education: University College Cork; King's Inns

John O'Donoghue (born 28 May 1956) is an Irish former Fianna Fáil politician who served as Ceann Comhairle of Dáil Éireann from 2007 to 2009, Minister for Arts, Sport and Tourism from 2002 to 2007, Minister for Justice, Equality and Law Reform from 1997 to 2002 and Minister of State at the Department of Finance from 1991 to 1992. He served as a Teachta Dála (TD) for the Kerry South constituency from 1987 to 2011.

== Early and private life ==
O'Donoghue was born in Cork in 1956 but is a native of Cahersiveen, County Kerry. He was educated locally at Cahersiveen CBS and later attended University College Cork (UCC) where he studied law. He graduated from UCC in 1976 with a BCL and in 1977 with a LLB. O'Donoghue attended the Law Society of Ireland from where he graduated as a solicitor in 1978. He practised as a solicitor in his Cahersiveen before entering political life.

O'Donoghue is married to Kate Ann Murphy and they have two sons and one daughter. His father-in-law Michael Pat Murphy was a Labour Party TD for Cork South-West from 1951 until 1981.

== Early political career ==
O'Donoghue first became involved in politics in the early 1980s. He first ran for the Dáil as a Fianna Fáil candidate at the 1981 general election, however, despite polling over 3,700 he failed to be elected. O'Donoghue contested both the February and November general elections in 1982 but, although he increased his vote, he still failed to be elected. Building on his electoral profile O'Donoghue was elected to Kerry County Council following the 1985 local elections. Both his mother and his father had served on the council before him. He served on that authority until 1997 and was elected chairperson in 1990.

O'Donoghue was finally elected to the Dáil on his fourth attempt at the 1987 general election. A supporter of the party leader, Charles Haughey, he remained on the backbenches until 1991 when he became Minister of State at the Department of Finance following Albert Reynolds's failed attempt to oust Haughey as Taoiseach. In this capacity, O'Donoghue was in charge of the Office of Public Works. He returned to the backbenches again when Reynolds finally became leader of Fianna Fáil and Taoiseach in February 1992. Two years later Fianna Fáil were back in opposition and Bertie Ahern was the new party leader. O'Donoghue was appointed to the front bench as spokesperson for Justice. In this capacity, he constantly criticised the incumbent Minister for Justice, Nora Owen of Fine Gael. He demanded 'zero tolerance' for criminals, and campaigned for harsher sentencing and increased prison places.

== Cabinet career: 1997–2007 ==
When Fianna Fáil returned to power with the Progressive Democrats following the 1997 general election, O'Donoghue joined the cabinet as Minister for Justice, Equality and Law Reform. In this capacity, he was involved in the British-Irish negotiations which led to the Good Friday Agreement in 1998.

In 2002, Fianna Fáil again failed to obtain an overall majority and formed a coalition government with the Progressive Democrats. O'Donoghue, in what was seen as a demotion, was appointed Minister for Arts, Sport and Tourism. He was involved in the finalisation of details for the rebuilding of Lansdowne Road. In mid-2004, Ahern announced that he would be reshuffling his cabinet in September, prompting speculation over O'Donoghue's cabinet position, and a possible move to another portfolio. O'Donoghue, however, retained his post.

== Ceann Comhairle ==
Following the 2007 general election, he was elected Ceann Comhairle by 90 votes to 75. O'Donoghue was nominated for the position by Taoiseach, Bertie Ahern. Labour Party leader Pat Rabbitte said that for the first time in almost 20 years, there would be an alternative and nominated Ruairi Quinn. Fine Gael leader Enda Kenny seconded Quinn's nomination but the nomination was not put to a vote.

=== Family days ===
On 28 June 2008, the first Houses of the Oireachtas family day was held. This initiative by O'Donoghue as Ceann Comhairle and the Cathaoirleach of Seanad Éireann, Pat Moylan aimed to increase public awareness in the work of the Houses of the Oireachtas. It included tours of both chambers of the Oireachtas, lectures on the history of Oireachtas, historic political speeches recited by actors and a hot air balloon – commemorating the balloon flight which took place in 1785 from Leinster Lawn. The Oireachtas family day took place again in 2009, but it has not been held since then.

=== Expenses scandal ===
Following an investigation in 2009 by Ken Foxe, Public Affairs correspondent with the Sunday Tribune, a controversy erupted over the amount and nature of O'Donoghue's spending and expenses. Foxe submitted several Freedom of Information requests that resulted in embarrassing forensic details of O'Donoghue's expense claims.

During a two-year tenure as Minister for Arts, Sport and Tourism, O'Donoghue's ministerial expenses amounted to €126,000. The Minister claimed expense claims that involved foreign trips for himself and both his wife and personal secretary. Sinn Féin raised the spending spree with the Dáil, while a Fine Gael spokesperson branded the expense claims as "indulgent".

In May 2006, O'Donoghue used the government jet for a six-day journey at the cost of €32,450. O'Donoghue, accompanied by his wife, attended the Cannes Film Festival. He returned from Cannes to Kerry to attend the opening of new offices for the Fexco company in Killorglin. He then travelled from Kerry to Cardiff for the Heineken Cup final, which Munster won, and travelled back to Cannes by government jet. He went from Cannes to London for a Ryder Cup promotional event, before returning to Dublin on 24 May 2006.

Expenses for car-hire services provided by a London-based firm to O'Donoghue during four visits to Britain in 2006 and 2007 came to a total of €21,289.57, according to documents released under the Freedom of Information (FOI) Act. Documents released to The Irish Times showed that three of the four visits were connected with O'Donoghue's attendance at race meetings in Cheltenham and Ascot.

In 2006, when O'Donoghue visited Manchester on official business during St Patrick's week before attending Cheltenham, car-hire payments made to Terry Gallagher of Cartel Limousines Ltd came to €7,591.96 for "airport pick-ups". This covered the period 11–13 March. In June 2007, O'Donoghue attended the Royal Ascot race meeting over four days and Gallagher's firm was paid a total of €3,582.22, according to the official receipts.

On 21 August 2009, the Irish Independent reported that in January 2006 O'Donoghue spent €472 on a limousine to commute between terminals in London Heathrow Airport despite a free airport service between the terminals existing for passengers. Fine Gael Environment spokesman Phil Hogan further criticised O'Donoghue's expense claims, labelling them as unjustifiable and inexcusable.

On 31 August 2009, O'Donoghue's expense claim controversy appeared on the front page of the Irish Independent, revealing how O'Donoghue received €330,000 in allowances and expenses in addition to his basic TD salary. It was further revealed that O'Donoghue flew to and from County Kerry at the expense of the taxpayer 73 times, despite having a full-time car driver to his service.

In August 2009, government Minister Dick Roche called upon O'Donoghue to explain his expense claims. These claims were echoed by opposition TDs including Fine Gael politician Leo Varadkar who called for a "full and Public" explanation, requesting an investigation as to whether O'Donoghue's expense claims were standard under Fianna Fáil leadership during his tenure as Minister for Arts, Sport and Tourism. In August 2009, Independent TD Jackie Healy-Rae requested a public statement from O'Donoghue, reiterating the need for O'Donoghue to defend himself, claiming that "the people want answers".

In a letter sent to all members of the Dáil on 11 September 2009, O'Donoghue defended his record as a Minister and as Ceann Comhairle. He said he had stayed silent so far on the issue to protect the impartiality of his current position. He acknowledged that some of the costs incurred appeared high, and regretted that they occurred. He also pointed out that a minister would not be informed of the details of such expenditure and he said he would work to ensure such costs are reduced to the minimum in the future.

Despite the extravagance of the reported expense claims and his delay in addressing the controversy, O'Donoghue maintained that he acted in "good faith". O'Donoghue refused to comment on newspaper articles that revealed indulgent expenditure. In response to O'Donoghue's letter, Fine Gael leader Enda Kenny called on O'Donoghue to issue a public apology to the Irish public for the expenses incurred, claiming that the O'Donoghue's response "did not go far enough". Fianna Fáil TD Mattie McGrath speaking on Today FM compared O'Donoghue's actions to that of a 'latter-day prince'.

In an interview on the RTÉ News: Six One on 14 September 2009, Róisín Shortall of the Labour Party claimed that O'Donoghue had underestimated the public's anger against what she called his "junketeering". She questioned the nature of O'Donoghue's statement that failed to address the public, maintaining that it "would be very very" difficult for him to hold his position of Ceann Comhairle.

On 3 October 2009, some hours after the information had been provided to an Irish newspaper under an FOI request, O'Donoghue's expenses record was released by his office. €45,000 had been spent on internal flights, while a reported €5,000 was claimed for VIP lounge access. Further spending included presents for dignitaries and flights for his wife. Coincidentally, two of O'Donoghue's trips to Paris took place at the same time as the Prix de l'Arc de Triomphe. On 4 October 2009, the full extent of O'Donoghue's trips to Paris were revealed by several national newspapers. It was reported that in 2007, Mr O'Donoghue spent two days at the races while his meeting with the French National Assembly only took place while travelling between his hotel and Paris-Charles de Gaulle Airport. Further spending which was branded as lavish included €1,543 spent on transport over three days and hotel costs over €500 per night. It was widely reported that in total O'Donoghue's trip cost €6,126.42, which was later claimed as 'expenses'.

Sinn Féin were the first to call for O'Donoghue to resign, claiming his position was untenable given "a continued waste of public money" since he took the job. In a debate in the Dáil on 6 October 2009, Labour Party leader Eamon Gilmore also said that John O'Donoghue's position as Ceann Comharile was "untenable", and that the Labour Party would table a motion of no confidence in him. After the Dáil debate, the Fine Gael leader Enda Kenny issued a statement calling on O'Donoghue to "resign forthwith" in the interest of the independence of the office of the Ceann Comhairle.

=== Resignation ===
O'Donoghue resigned his position of Ceann Comhairle on 13 October 2009. In his resignation statement, O'Donoghue defended his record in the controversy surrounding his foreign travel expenses, and said he was a scapegoat for an expenses regime that had fallen into disrepute. He stated that his overseas travel spending was not markedly different from other Ministers and he also alleged that Eamon Gilmore's call for his resignation in the Dáil on 6 October 2009 had denied him the right to defend his position.

O´Donoghue subsequently took out a defamation case against the newspaper, Kerry's Eye over articles alleging that the politician had been forced out of office because of his lavish expenses.

== 2011 general election and aftermath ==
O'Donoghue lost his seat in the 2011 general election, to former Fianna Fáil councillor Tom Fleming who ran as an Independent. In his concession speech, O'Donoghue remarked "I hope that the irony will not be lost upon you that I stand here, on my evening of defeat, in a hall – this magnificent sports complex – which I helped to build". He received a lump sum of €237,000 and an annual pension of €128,000.

After losing office, he repeatedly signalled his intention to contest the subsequent Irish general election. However, internal party figures dismissed this, with one describing him as "political toast as far as the party is concerned".

In July 2014, he qualified for the bar, and now practices as a barrister.

== See also ==
- Families in the Oireachtas

Political offices
Preceded by Vincent Brady	Minister of State at the Department of Finance; 1991–1992	Succeeded by Noel Treacy
Preceded by Nora Owen	Minister for Justice, Equality and Law Reform; 1997–2002	Succeeded by Michael McDowell
Preceded by Jim McDaid	Minister for Arts, Sport and Tourism; 2002–2007	Succeeded by Séamus Brennan
Preceded by Rory O'Hanlon	Ceann Comhairle of Dáil Éireann; 2007–2009	Succeeded by Séamus Kirk

Dáil	Election	Deputy (Party)	Deputy (Party)	Deputy (Party)
9th	1937	John Flynn (FF)	Frederick Crowley (FF)	Fionán Lynch (FG)
10th	1938	John Flynn (FF)	Frederick Crowley (FF)	Fionán Lynch (FG)
11th	1943	John Healy (FF)	Frederick Crowley (FF)	Fionán Lynch (FG)
12th	1944	John Healy (FF)	Frederick Crowley (FF)	Fionán Lynch (FG)
12th	1944 by-election	John Healy (FF)	Frederick Crowley (FF)	Donal O'Donoghue (FF)
12th	1945 by-election	John Healy (FF)	Honor Crowley (FF)	Donal O'Donoghue (FF)
13th	1948	John Flynn (Ind.)	Honor Crowley (FF)	Patrick Palmer (FG)
14th	1951	John Flynn (Ind.)	Honor Crowley (FF)	Patrick Palmer (FG)
15th	1954	John Flynn (FF)	Honor Crowley (FF)	Patrick Palmer (FG)
16th	1957	John Joe Rice (SF)	Honor Crowley (FF)	Patrick Palmer (FG)
17th	1961	Timothy O'Connor (FF)	Honor Crowley (FF)	Patrick Connor (FG)
18th	1965	Timothy O'Connor (FF)	Honor Crowley (FF)	Patrick Connor (FG)
18th	1966 by-election	Timothy O'Connor (FF)	John O'Leary (FF)	Patrick Connor (FG)
19th	1969	Timothy O'Connor (FF)	John O'Leary (FF)	Michael Begley (FG)
20th	1973	Timothy O'Connor (FF)	John O'Leary (FF)	Michael Begley (FG)
21st	1977	Timothy O'Connor (FF)	John O'Leary (FF)	Michael Begley (FG)
22nd	1981	Michael Moynihan (Lab)	John O'Leary (FF)	Michael Begley (FG)
23rd	1982 (Feb)	Michael Moynihan (Lab)	John O'Leary (FF)	Michael Begley (FG)
24th	1982 (Nov)	Michael Moynihan (Lab)	John O'Leary (FF)	Michael Begley (FG)
25th	1987	John O'Donoghue (Note: O'Donoghue served as Ceann Comhairle in the 30th Dáil from 2007 to 2009.) (FF)	John O'Leary (FF)	Michael Begley (FG)
26th	1989	John O'Donoghue (FF)	John O'Leary (FF)	Michael Moynihan (Lab)
27th	1992	John O'Donoghue (FF)	John O'Leary (FF)	Breeda Moynihan-Cronin (Lab)
28th	1997	John O'Donoghue (FF)	Jackie Healy-Rae (Ind.)	Breeda Moynihan-Cronin (Lab)
29th	2002	John O'Donoghue (FF)	Jackie Healy-Rae (Ind.)	Breeda Moynihan-Cronin (Lab)
30th	2007	John O'Donoghue (FF)	Jackie Healy-Rae (Ind.)	Tom Sheahan (FG)
31st	2011	Tom Fleming (Ind.)	Michael Healy-Rae (Ind.)	Brendan Griffin (FG)
32nd	2016	Constituency abolished. See Kerry		
