= Michael Moynihan (Kerry politician) =

Irish politician (1917–2001)

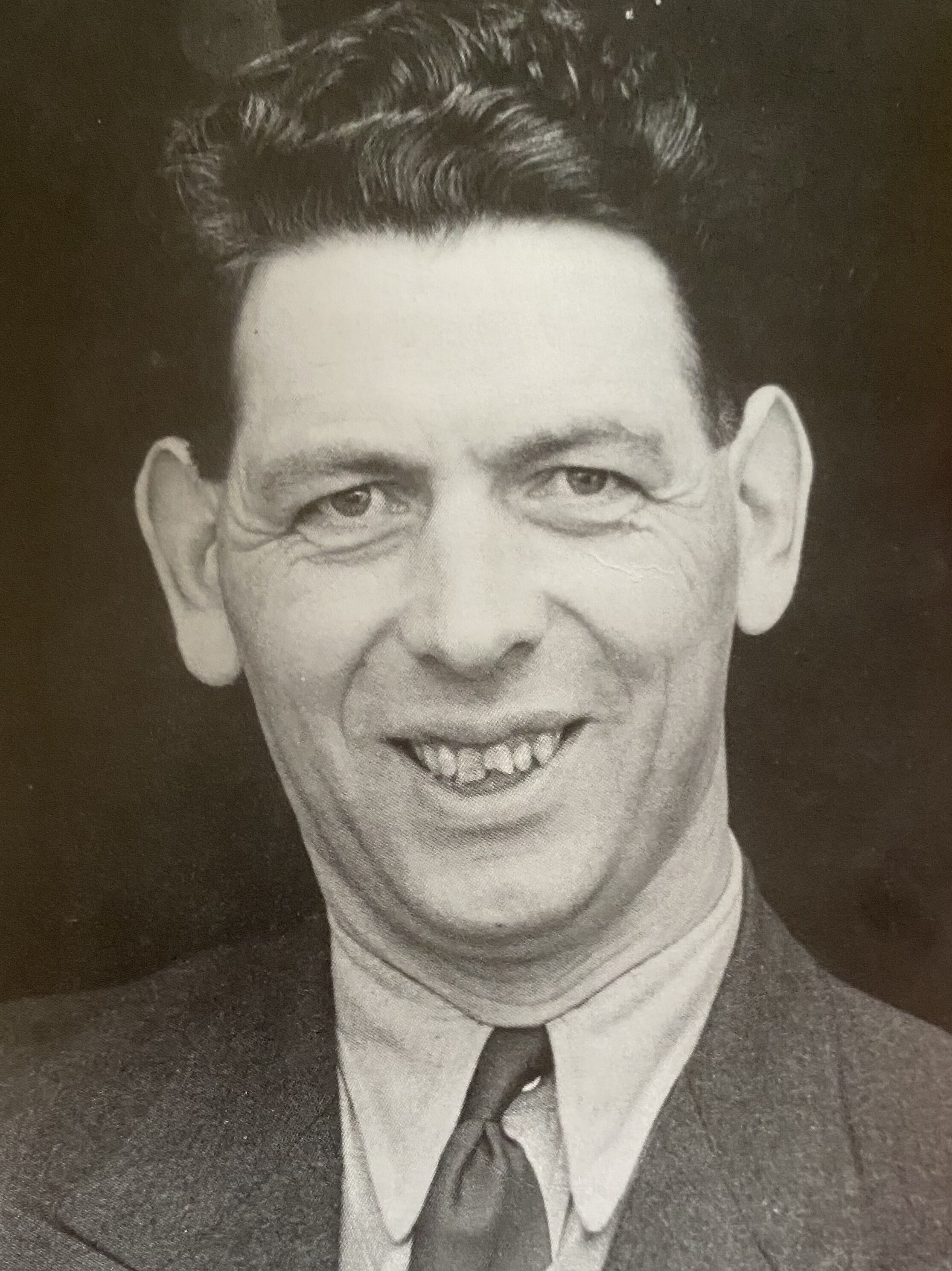
- Moynihan in 1954

Minister of State
- 1982–1987: Trade, Commerce and Tourism

Teachta Dála
- In office June 1989 – November 1992
- In office June 1981 – February 1987
- Constituency: Kerry South

Senator
- In office 1 June 1973 – 11 June 1981
- Constituency: Industrial and Commercial Panel

Personal details
- Born: 17 June 1917 Kinsale, County Cork, Ireland
- Died: 27 June 2001 (aged 84) Cork, Ireland
- Party: Labour Party
- Children: Breeda

Michael Moynihan (17 June 1917 – 27 June 2001) was an Irish Labour Party politician who served as Minister of State at the Department of Trade, Commerce and Tourism from 1982 to 1987. He served as a senator from 1973 to 1981 and as a Teachta Dála for the Kerry South constituency from 1981 to 1987 and 1989 to 1992.

== Biography ==
Moynihan was born in Kinsale, County Cork, in 1917. He was a psychiatric nurse by profession.

He was an unsuccessful candidate in the Kerry South constituency six times, at the 1954, 1961, 1965, 1973 and 1977 general elections, and at a by-election in 1966.

He was elected in 1973 to the 13th Seanad as a senator for the Industrial and Commercial Panel, which re-elected him in 1977 to the 14th Seanad.

At the 1981 general election, on his seventh attempt, He was elected to the 22nd Dáil, becoming the first ever Labour Party TD for Kerry South, and returned to the 23rd Dáil at the February 1982 general election. He was re-elected at the November 1982 general election, sitting in the 24th Dáil. He served as Minister of State at the Department of Trade, Commerce and Tourism from 1982 to 1987.

Moynihan was defeated at the 1987 general election, but returned at the 1989 general election to sit in the 26th Dáil. He did not stand at the 1992 general election, when his seat was retained for the Labour Party by his daughter Breeda Moynihan-Cronin.

== See also ==
- Families in the Oireachtas

Dáil	Election	Deputy (Party)	Deputy (Party)	Deputy (Party)
9th	1937	John Flynn (FF)	Frederick Crowley (FF)	Fionán Lynch (FG)
10th	1938	John Flynn (FF)	Frederick Crowley (FF)	Fionán Lynch (FG)
11th	1943	John Healy (FF)	Frederick Crowley (FF)	Fionán Lynch (FG)
12th	1944	John Healy (FF)	Frederick Crowley (FF)	Fionán Lynch (FG)
12th	1944 by-election	John Healy (FF)	Frederick Crowley (FF)	Donal O'Donoghue (FF)
12th	1945 by-election	John Healy (FF)	Honor Crowley (FF)	Donal O'Donoghue (FF)
13th	1948	John Flynn (Ind.)	Honor Crowley (FF)	Patrick Palmer (FG)
14th	1951	John Flynn (Ind.)	Honor Crowley (FF)	Patrick Palmer (FG)
15th	1954	John Flynn (FF)	Honor Crowley (FF)	Patrick Palmer (FG)
16th	1957	John Joe Rice (SF)	Honor Crowley (FF)	Patrick Palmer (FG)
17th	1961	Timothy O'Connor (FF)	Honor Crowley (FF)	Patrick Connor (FG)
18th	1965	Timothy O'Connor (FF)	Honor Crowley (FF)	Patrick Connor (FG)
18th	1966 by-election	Timothy O'Connor (FF)	John O'Leary (FF)	Patrick Connor (FG)
19th	1969	Timothy O'Connor (FF)	John O'Leary (FF)	Michael Begley (FG)
20th	1973	Timothy O'Connor (FF)	John O'Leary (FF)	Michael Begley (FG)
21st	1977	Timothy O'Connor (FF)	John O'Leary (FF)	Michael Begley (FG)
22nd	1981	Michael Moynihan (Lab)	John O'Leary (FF)	Michael Begley (FG)
23rd	1982 (Feb)	Michael Moynihan (Lab)	John O'Leary (FF)	Michael Begley (FG)
24th	1982 (Nov)	Michael Moynihan (Lab)	John O'Leary (FF)	Michael Begley (FG)
25th	1987	John O'Donoghue (Note: O'Donoghue served as Ceann Comhairle in the 30th Dáil from 2007 to 2009.) (FF)	John O'Leary (FF)	Michael Begley (FG)
26th	1989	John O'Donoghue (FF)	John O'Leary (FF)	Michael Moynihan (Lab)
27th	1992	John O'Donoghue (FF)	John O'Leary (FF)	Breeda Moynihan-Cronin (Lab)
28th	1997	John O'Donoghue (FF)	Jackie Healy-Rae (Ind.)	Breeda Moynihan-Cronin (Lab)
29th	2002	John O'Donoghue (FF)	Jackie Healy-Rae (Ind.)	Breeda Moynihan-Cronin (Lab)
30th	2007	John O'Donoghue (FF)	Jackie Healy-Rae (Ind.)	Tom Sheahan (FG)
31st	2011	Tom Fleming (Ind.)	Michael Healy-Rae (Ind.)	Brendan Griffin (FG)
32nd	2016	Constituency abolished. See Kerry		
