= Michael Begley (politician) =

Irish politician (1932–2012)

Minister of State
- 1981–1982: Trade, Commerce and Tourism

Parliamentary Secretary
- 1975–1977: Finance
- 1973–1975: Local Government

Teachta Dála
- In office June 1969 – June 1989
- Constituency: Kerry South

Personal details
- Born: 22 August 1932 Dingle, County Kerry, Ireland
- Died: 26 March 2012 (aged 79) Cork, Ireland
- Party: Fine Gael
- Spouse: Eleanor Begley (m. 1961)
- Children: 3
- Education: University College Cork

Michael Begley (22 August 1932 – 26 March 2012) was an Irish Fine Gael politician who served as Minister of State at the Department of Trade, Commerce and Tourism from 1981 to 1982, Parliamentary Secretary to the Minister for Finance from 1975 to 1977 and Parliamentary Secretary to the Minister for Local Government from 1973 to 1975. He served as a Teachta Dála (TD) for the Kerry South constituency from 1969 to 1989.

Born in Dingle, County Kerry, in 1932, to a farming family. Begley was a carpenter and secondary school teacher before entering national politics.

Prior to his election as a TD, Begley was elected to Kerry County Council and subsequently served as chairman of the council from 1966 to 1967. He was first elected to Dáil Éireann on his third attempt at the 1969 general election for Kerry South. Four years later in 1973, Fine Gael came to power in coalition government with the Labour Party and Begley was appointed as Minister of State with responsibility for Local Government. In 1975, Begley became Parliamentary Secretary to the Minister for Finance following the death of Henry Kenny. He served in that position until 1977.

In 1981, he became a Junior Minister for the Department of Industry and Commerce in the government of Garret FitzGerald. He served in this capacity until 1982 when the government fell. Begley remained a TD until losing his seat at the 1989 general election to the Labour Party's Michael Moynihan. He then retired from politics.

Michael Begley died aged 79. Tributes were paid among many politicians including Taoiseach Enda Kenny and Tánaiste Eamon Gilmore.

Political offices
Preceded by Liam Cunningham	Parliamentary Secretary to the Minister for Local Government; 1973–1975	Succeeded by Oliver J. Flanagan
Preceded by Henry Kenny	Parliamentary Secretary to the Minister for Finance; 1975–1977	Succeeded by Pearse Wyse
Preceded by Denis Gallagher	Minister of State at the Department of Trade, Commerce and Tourism; 1981–1982	Office abolished

Dáil	Election	Deputy (Party)	Deputy (Party)	Deputy (Party)
9th	1937	John Flynn (FF)	Frederick Crowley (FF)	Fionán Lynch (FG)
10th	1938	John Flynn (FF)	Frederick Crowley (FF)	Fionán Lynch (FG)
11th	1943	John Healy (FF)	Frederick Crowley (FF)	Fionán Lynch (FG)
12th	1944	John Healy (FF)	Frederick Crowley (FF)	Fionán Lynch (FG)
12th	1944 by-election	John Healy (FF)	Frederick Crowley (FF)	Donal O'Donoghue (FF)
12th	1945 by-election	John Healy (FF)	Honor Crowley (FF)	Donal O'Donoghue (FF)
13th	1948	John Flynn (Ind.)	Honor Crowley (FF)	Patrick Palmer (FG)
14th	1951	John Flynn (Ind.)	Honor Crowley (FF)	Patrick Palmer (FG)
15th	1954	John Flynn (FF)	Honor Crowley (FF)	Patrick Palmer (FG)
16th	1957	John Joe Rice (SF)	Honor Crowley (FF)	Patrick Palmer (FG)
17th	1961	Timothy O'Connor (FF)	Honor Crowley (FF)	Patrick Connor (FG)
18th	1965	Timothy O'Connor (FF)	Honor Crowley (FF)	Patrick Connor (FG)
18th	1966 by-election	Timothy O'Connor (FF)	John O'Leary (FF)	Patrick Connor (FG)
19th	1969	Timothy O'Connor (FF)	John O'Leary (FF)	Michael Begley (FG)
20th	1973	Timothy O'Connor (FF)	John O'Leary (FF)	Michael Begley (FG)
21st	1977	Timothy O'Connor (FF)	John O'Leary (FF)	Michael Begley (FG)
22nd	1981	Michael Moynihan (Lab)	John O'Leary (FF)	Michael Begley (FG)
23rd	1982 (Feb)	Michael Moynihan (Lab)	John O'Leary (FF)	Michael Begley (FG)
24th	1982 (Nov)	Michael Moynihan (Lab)	John O'Leary (FF)	Michael Begley (FG)
25th	1987	John O'Donoghue (Note: O'Donoghue served as Ceann Comhairle in the 30th Dáil from 2007 to 2009.) (FF)	John O'Leary (FF)	Michael Begley (FG)
26th	1989	John O'Donoghue (FF)	John O'Leary (FF)	Michael Moynihan (Lab)
27th	1992	John O'Donoghue (FF)	John O'Leary (FF)	Breeda Moynihan-Cronin (Lab)
28th	1997	John O'Donoghue (FF)	Jackie Healy-Rae (Ind.)	Breeda Moynihan-Cronin (Lab)
29th	2002	John O'Donoghue (FF)	Jackie Healy-Rae (Ind.)	Breeda Moynihan-Cronin (Lab)
30th	2007	John O'Donoghue (FF)	Jackie Healy-Rae (Ind.)	Tom Sheahan (FG)
31st	2011	Tom Fleming (Ind.)	Michael Healy-Rae (Ind.)	Brendan Griffin (FG)
32nd	2016	Constituency abolished. See Kerry		
