= Honor Crowley =

Irish politician (1903–1966)

Teachta Dála
- In office December 1945 – 18 October 1966
- Constituency: Kerry South

Personal details
- Born: Honor Mary Boland; 19 October 1903 Dublin, Ireland
- Died: 18 October 1966 (aged 62) Tralee, County Kerry, Ireland
- Party: Fianna Fáil
- Spouse: Frederick Crowley (m. 1939)
- Relations: Bridget Boland (sister)
- Parent: John Pius Boland (father)

Honor Mary Crowley (née Boland; 19 October 1903 – 18 October 1966) was an Irish Fianna Fáil politician who served as a Teachta Dála (TD) for the Kerry South constituency from 1945 to 1966.

She was one of five daughters of the MP John Pius Boland, who won gold medals in Tennis at the 1896 Olympics in Athens. He was a member of the Irish Parliamentary Party, and represented South Kerry from 1900 until 1918.

A social worker before entering politics, Crowley was first elected to the 12th Dáil at the by-election on 4 December 1945 caused by the death of her husband, Fianna Fáil TD Frederick Crowley. She was re-elected at the next six general elections, and died in 1966 while still in office. She was the first woman to represent Ireland on a delegation to the Council of Europe in Strasbourg, which she did between 1954 and 1957.

The 1966 by-election following her death was won by the Fianna Fáil candidate, John O'Leary.

Her sister Bridget Boland was a playwright.

== See also ==
- Families in the Oireachtas

Dáil	Election	Deputy (Party)	Deputy (Party)	Deputy (Party)
9th	1937	John Flynn (FF)	Frederick Crowley (FF)	Fionán Lynch (FG)
10th	1938	John Flynn (FF)	Frederick Crowley (FF)	Fionán Lynch (FG)
11th	1943	John Healy (FF)	Frederick Crowley (FF)	Fionán Lynch (FG)
12th	1944	John Healy (FF)	Frederick Crowley (FF)	Fionán Lynch (FG)
12th	1944 by-election	John Healy (FF)	Frederick Crowley (FF)	Donal O'Donoghue (FF)
12th	1945 by-election	John Healy (FF)	Honor Crowley (FF)	Donal O'Donoghue (FF)
13th	1948	John Flynn (Ind.)	Honor Crowley (FF)	Patrick Palmer (FG)
14th	1951	John Flynn (Ind.)	Honor Crowley (FF)	Patrick Palmer (FG)
15th	1954	John Flynn (FF)	Honor Crowley (FF)	Patrick Palmer (FG)
16th	1957	John Joe Rice (SF)	Honor Crowley (FF)	Patrick Palmer (FG)
17th	1961	Timothy O'Connor (FF)	Honor Crowley (FF)	Patrick Connor (FG)
18th	1965	Timothy O'Connor (FF)	Honor Crowley (FF)	Patrick Connor (FG)
18th	1966 by-election	Timothy O'Connor (FF)	John O'Leary (FF)	Patrick Connor (FG)
19th	1969	Timothy O'Connor (FF)	John O'Leary (FF)	Michael Begley (FG)
20th	1973	Timothy O'Connor (FF)	John O'Leary (FF)	Michael Begley (FG)
21st	1977	Timothy O'Connor (FF)	John O'Leary (FF)	Michael Begley (FG)
22nd	1981	Michael Moynihan (Lab)	John O'Leary (FF)	Michael Begley (FG)
23rd	1982 (Feb)	Michael Moynihan (Lab)	John O'Leary (FF)	Michael Begley (FG)
24th	1982 (Nov)	Michael Moynihan (Lab)	John O'Leary (FF)	Michael Begley (FG)
25th	1987	John O'Donoghue (Note: O'Donoghue served as Ceann Comhairle in the 30th Dáil from 2007 to 2009.) (FF)	John O'Leary (FF)	Michael Begley (FG)
26th	1989	John O'Donoghue (FF)	John O'Leary (FF)	Michael Moynihan (Lab)
27th	1992	John O'Donoghue (FF)	John O'Leary (FF)	Breeda Moynihan-Cronin (Lab)
28th	1997	John O'Donoghue (FF)	Jackie Healy-Rae (Ind.)	Breeda Moynihan-Cronin (Lab)
29th	2002	John O'Donoghue (FF)	Jackie Healy-Rae (Ind.)	Breeda Moynihan-Cronin (Lab)
30th	2007	John O'Donoghue (FF)	Jackie Healy-Rae (Ind.)	Tom Sheahan (FG)
31st	2011	Tom Fleming (Ind.)	Michael Healy-Rae (Ind.)	Brendan Griffin (FG)
32nd	2016	Constituency abolished. See Kerry		
