= John Joe Rice =

Irish politician ((1893–1970)

Teachta Dála
- In office March 1957 – October 1961
- Constituency: Kerry South

Personal details
- Born: 19 June 1893 Cork, Ireland
- Died: 24 July 1970 (aged 77) Kenmare, County Kerry, Ireland
- Party: Sinn Féin
- Spouse: Nora Aherne
- Children: 1

Military service
- Allegiance: Irish Volunteers; Irish Republican Army; Anti-Treaty IRA
- Rank: Officer commanding
- Battles/wars: Irish War of Independence; Irish Civil War

John Joe Rice (19 June 1893 – 24 July 1970) was an Irish Sinn Féin politician who served as a Teachta Dála (TD) for the Kerry South constituency from 1957 to 1961.

== Early life ==
He was born in Cork in 1893, but raised in the town land of Kilmurry near Kenmare, County Kerry. He was the son of George Rice, a draper's assistant, and Ellen Rice (née Ring). After national school he became a clerk with the Great Southern and Western Railway company working at stations in Kenmare, Killorglin, and Killarney.

== Revolution and Civil War ==
Rice joined the Irish Volunteers in 1913. At the outbreak of the Irish War of Independence, he became Officer Commanding of the 5th Battalion of the Kerry No. 2 Brigade, a unit he would also command during the Irish Civil War, where they fought as part of the Anti-Treaty IRA.

== TD for Kerry South ==
After the civil war he continued to be active in the IRA and Sinn Féin. He attended IRA executive meetings (1923) and was involved in attempts to reorganise the IRA (1924). He was a delegate to the Sinn Féin ardfheis in 1926, opposing the proposal of Éamon de Valera that abstention be a matter of policy rather than principle. He was elected as a Sinn Féin TD for the Kerry South constituency at the 1957 general election. He did not take his seat in the Dáil due to the Sinn Féin policy of abstentionism. He was one of four Sinn Féin TDs elected at the 1957 general election, the others being Ruairí Ó Brádaigh, John Joe McGirl and Eighneachán Ó hAnnluain. During his time as a TD, he campaigned against the Special Powers Act, which granted the Irish state extra abilities to deal with and punish suspected members of the IRA. He was defeated at the 1961 general election.

== Expulsion from Sinn Fein ==
In 1966, he and fellow Kerry Republican John Joe Sheehy were expelled from Sinn Féin. This move both foreshadowed and fuelled the split in 1969/1970 of both the IRA and Sinn Féin, which led to the creation of the Marxist-Leninist Official IRA and the more traditional but still left-wing Provisional IRA, and in parallel Sinn Féin – The Workers' Party and "Provisional" Sinn Féin. Rice gave his support to the Provisionals.

== Family ==
His sister, Rosalie Rice, was a member of Cumann na mBan during the 1916 Easter Rising and was arrested for sending a telegram alerting the Irish Republican Brotherhood (IRB) in America to the rising. His cousins Eugene and Timothy Ring were members of the IRB and were also involved with the telegram. His grandfather, Timothy Ring, was a Fenian who fought in the uprising. Two of his cousins were members of the Royal Irish Constabulary who would both later help the republican side during the Irish revolutionary period.

He died on 1 July 1970.

Dáil	Election	Deputy (Party)	Deputy (Party)	Deputy (Party)
9th	1937	John Flynn (FF)	Frederick Crowley (FF)	Fionán Lynch (FG)
10th	1938	John Flynn (FF)	Frederick Crowley (FF)	Fionán Lynch (FG)
11th	1943	John Healy (FF)	Frederick Crowley (FF)	Fionán Lynch (FG)
12th	1944	John Healy (FF)	Frederick Crowley (FF)	Fionán Lynch (FG)
12th	1944 by-election	John Healy (FF)	Frederick Crowley (FF)	Donal O'Donoghue (FF)
12th	1945 by-election	John Healy (FF)	Honor Crowley (FF)	Donal O'Donoghue (FF)
13th	1948	John Flynn (Ind.)	Honor Crowley (FF)	Patrick Palmer (FG)
14th	1951	John Flynn (Ind.)	Honor Crowley (FF)	Patrick Palmer (FG)
15th	1954	John Flynn (FF)	Honor Crowley (FF)	Patrick Palmer (FG)
16th	1957	John Joe Rice (SF)	Honor Crowley (FF)	Patrick Palmer (FG)
17th	1961	Timothy O'Connor (FF)	Honor Crowley (FF)	Patrick Connor (FG)
18th	1965	Timothy O'Connor (FF)	Honor Crowley (FF)	Patrick Connor (FG)
18th	1966 by-election	Timothy O'Connor (FF)	John O'Leary (FF)	Patrick Connor (FG)
19th	1969	Timothy O'Connor (FF)	John O'Leary (FF)	Michael Begley (FG)
20th	1973	Timothy O'Connor (FF)	John O'Leary (FF)	Michael Begley (FG)
21st	1977	Timothy O'Connor (FF)	John O'Leary (FF)	Michael Begley (FG)
22nd	1981	Michael Moynihan (Lab)	John O'Leary (FF)	Michael Begley (FG)
23rd	1982 (Feb)	Michael Moynihan (Lab)	John O'Leary (FF)	Michael Begley (FG)
24th	1982 (Nov)	Michael Moynihan (Lab)	John O'Leary (FF)	Michael Begley (FG)
25th	1987	John O'Donoghue (Note: O'Donoghue served as Ceann Comhairle in the 30th Dáil from 2007 to 2009.) (FF)	John O'Leary (FF)	Michael Begley (FG)
26th	1989	John O'Donoghue (FF)	John O'Leary (FF)	Michael Moynihan (Lab)
27th	1992	John O'Donoghue (FF)	John O'Leary (FF)	Breeda Moynihan-Cronin (Lab)
28th	1997	John O'Donoghue (FF)	Jackie Healy-Rae (Ind.)	Breeda Moynihan-Cronin (Lab)
29th	2002	John O'Donoghue (FF)	Jackie Healy-Rae (Ind.)	Breeda Moynihan-Cronin (Lab)
30th	2007	John O'Donoghue (FF)	Jackie Healy-Rae (Ind.)	Tom Sheahan (FG)
31st	2011	Tom Fleming (Ind.)	Michael Healy-Rae (Ind.)	Brendan Griffin (FG)
32nd	2016	Constituency abolished. See Kerry		
