= Patrick Palmer (politician) =

Irish politician (1889–1971)

Teachta Dála
- In office February 1948 – October 1961
- Constituency: Kerry South

Personal details
- Born: 13 April 1889 Baltimore, County Cork, Ireland
- Died: 21 March 1971 (aged 81) Cork, Ireland
- Party: Fine Gael
- Education: University College Cork

Patrick William Palmer (13 April 1889 – 21 March 1971) was an Irish Fine Gael politician who served as a Teachta Dála (TD) for the Kerry South constituency from 1948 to 1961.

A national school teacher before entering politics, he was first elected to Dáil Éireann as a Fine Gael TD for the Kerry South constituency at the 1948 general election. He was re-elected at the 1951, 1954 and 1957 general elections. He retired from politics at the 1961 general election.

| Dáil | Election | Deputy (Party) | Deputy (Party) | Deputy (Party) |
|---|---|---|---|---|
| 9th | 1937 | John Flynn (FF) | Frederick Crowley (FF) | Fionán Lynch (FG) |
| 10th | 1938 | John Flynn (FF) | Frederick Crowley (FF) | Fionán Lynch (FG) |
| 11th | 1943 | John Healy (FF) | Frederick Crowley (FF) | Fionán Lynch (FG) |
| 12th | 1944 | John Healy (FF) | Frederick Crowley (FF) | Fionán Lynch (FG) |
| 12th | 1944 by-election | John Healy (FF) | Frederick Crowley (FF) | Donal O'Donoghue (FF) |
| 12th | 1945 by-election | John Healy (FF) | Honor Crowley (FF) | Donal O'Donoghue (FF) |
| 13th | 1948 | John Flynn (Ind.) | Honor Crowley (FF) | Patrick Palmer (FG) |
| 14th | 1951 | John Flynn (Ind.) | Honor Crowley (FF) | Patrick Palmer (FG) |
| 15th | 1954 | John Flynn (FF) | Honor Crowley (FF) | Patrick Palmer (FG) |
| 16th | 1957 | John Joe Rice (SF) | Honor Crowley (FF) | Patrick Palmer (FG) |
| 17th | 1961 | Timothy O'Connor (FF) | Honor Crowley (FF) | Patrick Connor (FG) |
| 18th | 1965 | Timothy O'Connor (FF) | Honor Crowley (FF) | Patrick Connor (FG) |
| 18th | 1966 by-election | Timothy O'Connor (FF) | John O'Leary (FF) | Patrick Connor (FG) |
| 19th | 1969 | Timothy O'Connor (FF) | John O'Leary (FF) | Michael Begley (FG) |
| 20th | 1973 | Timothy O'Connor (FF) | John O'Leary (FF) | Michael Begley (FG) |
| 21st | 1977 | Timothy O'Connor (FF) | John O'Leary (FF) | Michael Begley (FG) |
| 22nd | 1981 | Michael Moynihan (Lab) | John O'Leary (FF) | Michael Begley (FG) |
| 23rd | 1982 (Feb) | Michael Moynihan (Lab) | John O'Leary (FF) | Michael Begley (FG) |
| 24th | 1982 (Nov) | Michael Moynihan (Lab) | John O'Leary (FF) | Michael Begley (FG) |
| 25th | 1987 | John O'Donoghue (Note: O'Donoghue served as Ceann Comhairle in the 30th Dáil from 2007 to 2009.) (FF) | John O'Leary (FF) | Michael Begley (FG) |
| 26th | 1989 | John O'Donoghue (FF) | John O'Leary (FF) | Michael Moynihan (Lab) |
| 27th | 1992 | John O'Donoghue (FF) | John O'Leary (FF) | Breeda Moynihan-Cronin (Lab) |
| 28th | 1997 | John O'Donoghue (FF) | Jackie Healy-Rae (Ind.) | Breeda Moynihan-Cronin (Lab) |
| 29th | 2002 | John O'Donoghue (FF) | Jackie Healy-Rae (Ind.) | Breeda Moynihan-Cronin (Lab) |
| 30th | 2007 | John O'Donoghue (FF) | Jackie Healy-Rae (Ind.) | Tom Sheahan (FG) |
| 31st | 2011 | Tom Fleming (Ind.) | Michael Healy-Rae (Ind.) | Brendan Griffin (FG) |
| 32nd | 2016 | Constituency abolished. See Kerry | | |
