= Edmund Horan =

Irish politician

Senator
- In office 18 August 1944 – 21 April 1948
- Constituency: Agricultural Panel

Personal details
- Party: Clann na Talmhan; Independent

Edmund Horan was an Irish Clann na Talmhan politician. He was a member of Seanad Éireann from 1944 to 1948. He was elected to the 5th Seanad in July 1944 to the Agricultural Panel. He did not contest the 1948 Seanad election.

He stood unsuccessfully for Dáil Éireann on four occasions. He stood as an independent candidate for the Kerry North constituency at the 1943 general election, and for the Kerry South constituency at the 1944 general election. He stood as Clann na Talmhan candidate for Kerry South at the November 1944 and December 1945 by-elections.
