= 2016 Irish government formation =

Events of March to May 2016, resulting in a minority government

- Date: March–May 2016
- Location: Dublin, Ireland
- Participants: Enda Kenny; Richard Bruton; Simon Coveney; Frances Fitzgerald; Simon Harris; Eoghan Murphy; Leo Varadkar; Micheál Martin; Barry Cowen; Charlie McConalogue; Michael McGrath; Jim O'Callaghan; Healy-Raes: Danny and Michael; Finian McGrath; Denis Naughten; Shane Ross; Eamon Ryan; Katherine Zappone
- Outcome: Government of the 32nd Dáil

The events surrounding the formation of Ireland's government in 2016 took place during March, April and May of that year, following the general election held on 26 February, which failed to produce an overall majority for any of the country's outgoing political alliances and resulted in a hung parliament.

The outgoing administration was a coalition government of Fine Gael and the Labour Party. Both parties lost many seats, meaning they no longer commanded an overall majority in Dáil Éireann. The largest opposition party, Fianna Fáil, more than doubled its number of seats, becoming the second-largest party in the Dáil. The parties comprising the left-wing Right2Change alliance, as well as other unaligned parties such as the Green Party or the Social Democrats, also failed to win a majority of seats. Consequently, senior figures from both Fine Gael and Fianna Fáil embarked on talks with each other and also with independent politicians and representatives of several smaller parties, aiming at forming a viable administration.

This eventually resulted in Ireland's first minority government since 1989: a coalition led by Fine Gael with the support of nine independent politicians, and with a formal agreement that Fianna Fáil would abstain on matters of confidence and supply.

== Background ==
After the 2011 general election, Fine Gael and the Labour Party formed a coalition government, taking over from the previous Fianna Fáil-Green Party coalition government shortly after the latter had agreed to embark on the Economic Adjustment Programme for Ireland. Fine Gael and the Labour Party continued with these measures.

== Election ==
Graphical illustration of elected deputies. Note that this is not the official seating plan. Fine Gael: 50 Fianna Fáil: 44 Sinn Féin: 23 Labour Party: 7 AAA–PBP: 6 Independents 4 Change: 4 Social Democrats: 3 Green Party: 2 Independent: 19

The general election was held on Friday 26 February 2016. Fine Gael lost 26 seats; the Labour Party, which lost 30 seats, only just returned enough members to secure speaking rights in Dáil Éireann. Fianna Fáil added 23 seats, Sinn Féin added nine, and Anti-Austerity Alliance–People Before Profit also gained seats. The Social Democrats and Independents 4 Change returned all their elected representatives to the Dáil. Having lost all their seats in 2011, the Green Party returned two TDs; these included former Communications Minister Eamon Ryan. The result left Fine Gael and Fianna Fáil with similar seat numbers and brought an end to the previous government's overall majority.

== Initial statements and negotiations ==
Enda Kenny, the Taoiseach, immediately conceded on television that the outgoing coalition government of Fine Gael and Labour would be unable to continue. Fianna Fáil had entered negotiations with Independents and smaller parties by Tuesday 1 March when Fine Gael's efforts got underway. For Fianna Fáil this involved talks with newly elected TDs at constituency level "far, far away from Dublin". Fianna Fáil leader Micheál Martin was reported to have had an 'informal chat' with Catherine Murphy and Róisín Shortall of the Social Democrats in the Dáil canteen. Green Party leader Eamon Ryan also had talks with several parties.

On Thursday 3 March, Michael O'Leary, the CEO of Ryanair, called the outcome of the general election "a mess", and said he expected another election within 12 months. Ireland, he said, "can't survive with either a minority government or a coalition of liquorice all-sorts." Later that day, Fianna Fáil and Fine Gael parliamentarians met separately at Leinster House. At Fianna Fáil's parliamentary party meeting, leader Micheál Martin was reported to have said that it would take as long as two months to form a government. A statement from vice-chairperson of the Fine Gael Parliamentary Party Catherine Byrne said: "We agreed to work in a progressive manner towards the formation of a new government, but not at any cost ... forming an unstable government is not in the people's interest." The statement also made reference to the contentious election issue of the water utility company Irish Water: "The meeting strongly reiterated its commitment to supporting the Irish Water model as the best and most cost effective way of providing clean water and decent waste water services. The Irish people have shown enormous resilience in the last number of years and deserve stability." This contradicted an earlier contribution made by Simon Coveney on Prime Time when he suggested Fine Gael would "certainly be willing to talk about water" in any negotiations with other parties to form a government. Fianna Fáil's Barry Cowen had also indicated that abolishing Irish Water was a 'red line issue' but both Fine Gael and Fianna Fáil later "backtracked, U-turned and reinvented the wheel on water charges" as Kevin Doyle phrased it in the Irish Independent.

A meeting of Independents—minus Michael Healy-Rae and his brother Danny, who nonetheless maintained phone contact—also took place on 3 March in Kildare Street, with Denis Naughten chairing. On Friday 4 March, four of the six incoming Independent Alliance TDs met with Taoiseach Kenny to talk and present him with a copy of their Charter for Change. One of these, Shane Ross, said Fianna Fáil leader Micheál Martin had contacted them the previous day and that they would meet the following week. According to Michael Healy-Rae, he and his brother Danny met with Enda Kenny for "over an hour" on 4 March.

A statement by Marc MacSharry in which he said Fianna Fáil could enter a coalition with Fine Gael, provided that the role of Taoiseach rotated between the parties, was reported by the Irish Examiner as having been released "in order to test the waters as to such a deal".

== Reconvening of Dáil and first vote for Taoiseach ==
The Dáil reconvened on Thursday 10 March. It did not elect a Taoiseach and was adjourned until Tuesday 29 March, though talks continued. Its adjournment coincided with the Saint Patrick's Day festivities and an EU summit in Brussels, while Kenny also cut short his annual visit to Washington owing to the talks. References to the political deadlock came aplenty in Washington: Joe Biden told Kenny he would get 80 per cent of the vote if he ran in America, and Kenny was quoted as having told the Irish Embassy: "Bejaysus, I wish I didn't have to go back and face what I have to face".

Following the failure of the Dáil to elect a Taoiseach, Fianna Fáil named a negotiating team comprising four of its TDs: finance spokesman Michael McGrath, education spokesman Charlie McConalogue, environment spokesman Barry Cowen, and legal advisor and newly elected TD Jim O'Callaghan. The Irish Times noted that Fine Gael's negotiators with other groups included Frances Fitzgerald and Simon Coveney, who both attended most of their party's meetings with others, while the involvement of Leo Varadkar, Richard Bruton, Simon Harris and Eoghan Murphy was also noted. Meanwhile, the Sunday Independent of 13 March reported that Enda Kenny had a street conversation outside Leinster House with Fianna Fáil TD John McGuinness on government formation on 9 March, though McGuinness was not part of the team of TDs officially tasked with talks by Micheál Martin.

On the night of 15 March, hours after meeting the Fianna Fáil four, the Social Democrats announced they had pulled out of any further talks with Fianna Fáil or Fine Gael. Fianna Fáil also held talks with the Green Party on the same day; its leader, Eamon Ryan, promised to continue negotiating with the party alongside which he had sat in government between 2007 and 2011. Around the same time, Fine Gael's Simon Coveney met rural members of the Independent Alliance in Athlone, as well as non-Alliance Independents Michael Collins, Noel Grealish, Michael Harty, Mattie McGrath and Denis Naughten.

== Easter, and a second vote for Taoiseach ==
Negotiations continued over Easter (Easter Day fell on Sunday 27 March in 2016). This period also featured nationwide commemorations of the centenary of the 1916 Easter Rising.

On 29 March, Fine Gael met with rural Independents (led by former Fine Gael TD Denis Naughten); Fianna Fáil did likewise the next day. Fine Gael's commitments to the rural independents included more investment on rural transport and rural broadband; no closures of small schools, post offices or police stations; protection of the credit union sector, as well as commitments on housing and mental health.

On 30 March the Green Party pulled out of any further talks, claiming it wanted to leave Fine Gael and Fianna Fáil together to form a stable government.

Michael McDowell, a former Tánaiste who had led the Progressive Democrats, intervened around this time. McDowell called for Fine Gael and Fianna Fáil to come together and govern. He told The Irish Times's political podcast: "I was brought up in a strongly Fine Gael house, I was Garret FitzGerald's director of elections, I was his organiser, I was chairman of my local constituency – I know how Fine Gael hearts tick. I sat in cabinet, both as attorney general and minister for justice for seven years [in coalition] with Fianna Fáil... and I know there isn't a huge difference between them. But they think there is. That's the crucial thing. It's absolutely ingrained in them. They have convinced themselves of something that is a myth, fundamentally."

The first publicised contact between Martin and Kenny was announced on 31 March (34 days after the election), in the form of a twenty-minute telephone call. Martin reported that Kenny had told him any talks between them must wait until after the next Dáil vote on nominations for Taoiseach, which was due on the following Wednesday, 6 April. That vote also failed to elect a Taoiseach, with both Kenny and Martin failing to obtain enough votes to secure the post, while the vote made history when Anti-Austerity Alliance TD Ruth Coppinger became the first woman to be nominated as Taoiseach. Afterwards, Martin rejected claims by Kenny in the Dáil the previous afternoon that Kenny had invited him to talks.

Talks then began between Fianna Fáil and Fine Gael. On the night of 6 April, Fine Gael released a statement in which it announced that it had made a formal offer during talks with Martin to form a partnership government with Fianna Fáil and Independent TDs. However, Martin rejected this offer. A meeting between Kenny and Martin on 8 April was reported to have lasted only ten minutes.

Early on 9 April, Jim O'Callaghan hosted a covert meeting at his home with Leo Varadkar, Deirdre Gillane (chief adviser to Micheál Martin) and Andrew McDowell (a policy adviser to Enda Kenny). It lasted for more than an hour. Then came an announcement that Fianna Fáil and Fine Gael would meet, with both publishing a statement saying they would "discuss how a viable minority government would work".

== A third vote for Taoiseach ==
On 14 April the Dáil reconvened to vote on nominations for Taoiseach. Sinn Féin leader Gerry Adams had suggested postponing the vote due to ongoing negotiations, but his motion was rejected. Kenny lost three different votes for Taoiseach, the third by a vote of 52–77. Following Kenny's loss, Micheál Martin was also unable to receive the number of votes necessary to become Taoiseach by a vote of 43–91. Neither candidate was able to attract enough Independent TDs to secure a majority of the Dáil's votes. In an earlier meeting dubbed the "Ag House Meeting", 14 Independent TDs signed an agreement to abstain from voting for Taoiseach, calling upon the leaders of the major parties to agree to a reciprocal agreement with three budgets to provide stability for the Irish people.

Seán Ó Fearghaíl, the Ceann Comhairle, suggested after the vote that the Dáil be adjourned until 20 April. Despite opposition from TDs including Adams and Finian McGrath (Independent), the motion passed with the help of Fianna Fáil and Fine Gael TDs. The "Ag House Agreement" signed by the Dáil's Independent TDs also said that the TDs were stepping away from talks with the two major parties until the two major parties reached an agreement. However, the Independents did offer to facilitate any task that would hasten the formation of a government.

The next day on 15 April, talks resumed between Fianna Fáil and Fine Gael. Independent TD Finian McGrath, speaking with Sean O'Rourke on RTÉ, laid out further demands for the parties. In order for Independents to enter the government, McGrath said, Fine Gael would need to provide:

1. An implementation of Independent Alliance policies
2. A guarantee of three (ideally five) budgets
3. A third of all ministries in the government (about five ministries)

Barry Cowen of Fianna Fáil responded to the Ag House Agreement's demand for three budgets, saying that the party would look into the policy moving forward.

On 17 April, fifty-one days after the election, the Sunday Independent published a scathing editorial, calling for a government to be formed. On the same day, former Tánaiste Mary Harney intervened, claiming the deadlock in government formation would damage "Ireland's reputation" in remarks made during her closing address at the three-day Women in Media conference in Ballybunion. In the same address, Harney—who attended along with her husband Brian Geogheghan—claimed that "when she left public life she made a conscious decision to leave politics behind her".

Green Party leader Eamon Ryan met with Fine Gael on 19 April, with the party offering its support for a minority government from the opposition benches. Meanwhile, talks between Fine Gael and Fianna Fáil were held at Trinity College and led to the reported exchange of an economic paper between the two. Talks continued in the following days; however, they were slow to discuss the contentious issue of Irish Water.

== Minority government agreement reached ==
Talks continued for several weeks, with both Fine Gael and Fianna Fáil suggesting that a deal was untenable. Fine Gael briefly considered entering into a deal with their normal coalition partner the Labour Party, but that was viewed by many observers as unlikely. Michael D. Higgins, President of Ireland, issued a warning to the major party leaders on 19 April; he said that if they were unable to reach an agreement, he was "very, very well aware" of Article 13 of the constitution which gives him the "absolute power" to decide whether the Dáil should be dissolved if the Taoiseach tells him a government cannot be formed.

On 29 April, 63 days after the election, representatives from Fine Gael and Fianna Fáil announced that they had reached an agreement for a Fine Gael-led minority government. For extra stability, the agreement included a review date of September 2018, with the government permitted to rule until then.

== Government formation ==
On 6 May 2016, a fourth vote for Taoiseach was held in the Dáil. Enda Kenny became the first Fine Gael leader to be re-elected as Taoiseach. He did so by gaining just one vote more than the minimum required for gaining power under the terms of the minority government agreement with Fianna Fáil. Including his own vote, Kenny received the votes of Fine Gael TDs and nine independents: Seán Canney, John Halligan, Michael Harty, Michael Lowry, Finian McGrath, Kevin "Boxer" Moran, Denis Naughten, Shane Ross and Katherine Zappone. Lowry offered a handshake to Kenny shortly after Ceann Comhairle Seán Ó Fearghaíl confirmed the result.

Kenny then departed to Áras an Uachtaráin, where President Higgins presented him with his seal of office. The new administration was announced later the same evening, Shane Ross having confirmed himself as Minister for Transport in advance. Three Independent politicians secured senior cabinet posts: Zappone (appointed to the Seanad by Kenny in 2011), Naughten and Ross. Frances Fitzgerald, who had served as Minister for Justice and Equality in the previous government, kept that role and was also appointed Tánaiste in the new government.

The new cabinet arrived at the Áras shortly after 11 pm the same evening, to receive their seals of office from President Higgins in the State Reception room. As is traditional, Enda Kenny chaired the first cabinet meeting there; this ended shortly after midnight.

Kenny made the government's junior ministerial appointments on 19 May 2016, expanding the number of Ministers of State from fifteen to eighteen, the highest number of junior appointments since Bertie Ahern named 20 in 2007. These appointments were made up of a selection of Fine Gael and Independent deputies, and included four women–Helen McEntee (Minister of State for Mental Health and Older People), Marcella Corcoran Kennedy (Minister of State for Health Promotion), Catherine Byrne (Minister of State for Communities and the National Drugs Strategy) and Regina Doherty (Government chief whip).

Announcing his team of junior ministers, Kenny said that his government would place a stronger emphasis on important policy areas, particularly health; but Michael Brennan, political editor of The Sunday Business Post suggested the Taoiseach would face criticism from opposition parties for expanding government and creating "jobs for the boys" in an attempt to stave off discontent from his own backbenchers. Responding to the expanded lower tier of government, Fianna Fáil's Thomas Byrne noted that Fine Gael minister Richard Bruton had been very critical of Fianna Fáil when it increased the number of junior ministers to 20. John Downing of the Irish Independent suggested that increasing the number of junior ministers was "[Kenny's] effort to buy himself what political peace he can get in this strange new situation".
