= 32nd Dáil =

TDs from 2016 to 2020

←	31st Dáil	33rd Dáil	→

Overview
- Legislative body: Dáil Éireann
- Jurisdiction: Ireland
- Meeting place: Leinster House
- Term: 10 March 2016 – 14 January 2020
- Election: 2016 general election
- Government: 30th government of Ireland (2016–2017); 31st government of Ireland (2017–2020)
- Members: 158
- Ceann Comhairle: Seán Ó Fearghaíl
- Leas-Cheann Comhairle: Pat "the Cope" Gallagher
- Taoiseach: Leo Varadkar — Enda Kenny until 14 June 2017
- Tánaiste: Simon Coveney — Frances Fitzgerald until 28 November 2017
- Chief Whip: Seán Kyne
- Leader of the Opposition: Micheál Martin

Sessions
- 1st: 10 March 2016 – 21 July 2016
- 2nd: 27 September 2016 – 14 July 2017
- 3rd: 20 September 2017 – 12 July 2018
- 4th: 18 September 2018 – 11 July 2019
- 5th: 17 September 2019 – 14 January 2020

The 32nd Dáil was elected at the 2016 general election on 26 February and first met at 10.30 a.m. on 10 March 2016. The members of Dáil Éireann, the house of representatives of the Oireachtas (legislature) of Ireland, are known as TDs. It sat with the 25th Seanad as the two Houses of the Oireachtas.

The 32nd Dáil was dissolved by President Michael D. Higgins on 14 January 2020, at the request of the Taoiseach Leo Varadkar. The 32nd Dáil lasted 3 years, 310 days.

== Composition of the 32nd Dáil ==
- 30th, 31st government (Note: Katherine Zappone formed part of the government with Fine Gael.) (Note: Michael Fitzmaurice left the alliance in May 2016 and was not a member of the government. Seán Canney left the Independent Alliance in May 2018 but continued to participate in the government.)
- Providing confidence and supply

Party	Feb. 2016	Jan. 2020	Change
Fine Gael	50	47	▼3
Fianna Fáil	44	45	▲1
Sinn Féin	23	22	▼1
Labour	7	7	Steady
Solidarity–PBP (Note: Known as Anti-Austerity Alliance–People Before Profit until March 2017.)	6	6	Steady
Independent Alliance	6	3	▼3
Inds. 4 Change	4	1	▼3
Social Democrats	3	2	▼1
Green	2	3	▲1
Aontú	—N/a	1	▲1
Independent	13	19	▲6
Ceann Comhairle	—N/a	1	▲1
Vacant	—N/a	1	▲1
Total	158		

Graphical representation of the 32nd Dáil at its first sitting on 10 March 2016 (after Seán Ó Fearghaíl (Fianna Fáil) was elected as Ceann Comhairle). This was not the official seating plan.

== Ceann Comhairle ==
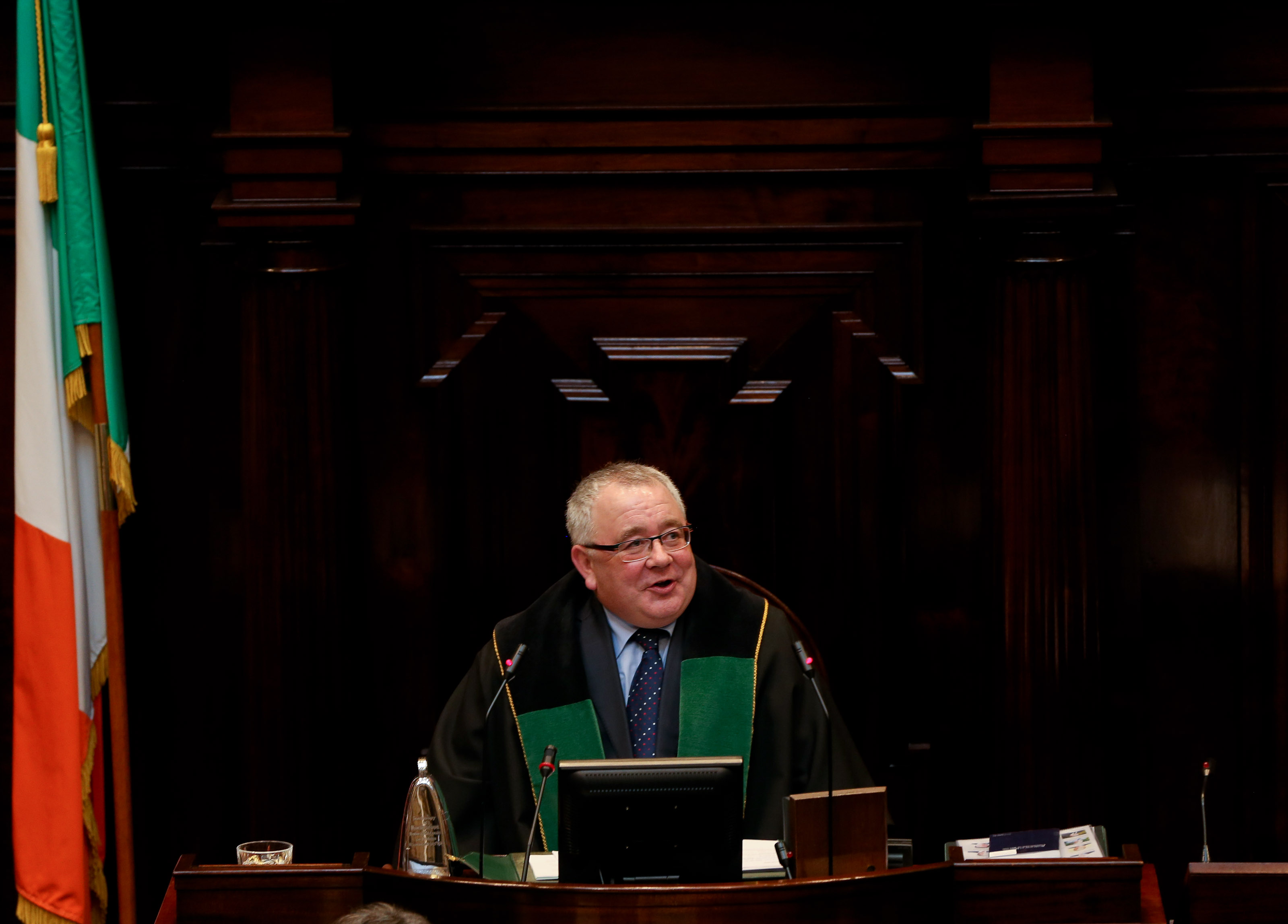
Ceann Comhairle Seán Ó Fearghaíl at the first sitting of the 32nd Dáil

- Ceann Comhairle: Seán Ó Fearghaíl (Fianna Fáil)
- Leas-Cheann Comhairle: Pat "the Cope" Gallagher (Fianna Fáil)

The first act of the 32nd Dáil was the election of the Ceann Comhairle. This was the first time the Ceann Comhairle was elected by secret ballot.

On 2 June 2016, Seán Crowe, Mattie McGrath, Pat "the Cope" Gallagher and Bernard Durkan were nominated for the position of Leas-Cheann Comhairle. No candidate was elected by resolution. On 6 July, the Dáil proceeded to an election by secret ballot using the single transferable vote. On 7 July, Gallagher was declared elected and approved by resolution.

== Political leadership ==
=== Government ===
- Taoiseach
  - Enda Kenny (6 May 2016 – 14 June 2017)
  - Leo Varadkar (14 June 2017 – 14 January 2020)
- Tánaiste
  - Frances Fitzgerald (6 May 2016 – 28 November 2017)
  - Simon Coveney (30 November 2017 – 14 January 2020)

=== Opposition ===
- Leader of the Opposition and Leader of Fianna Fáil: Micheál Martin
  - Fianna Fáil Chief whip: Michael Moynihan
- Leader of Sinn Féin: Gerry Adams (2016–2018), Mary Lou McDonald (2018–2020)
  - Sinn Féin Chief Whip: Aengus Ó Snodaigh
- Leader of the Labour Party: Brendan Howlin
- Leader of the Green Party: Eamon Ryan
- Leader of the Social Democrats: Catherine Murphy & Róisín Shortall

== Oireachtas Committees ==
Committee	Position	Name	Party
Agriculture, Food and the Marine	Chair	Pat Deering	Fine Gael
Budgetary Oversight	Chair	John Paul Phelan	Fine Gael
Children and Youth Affairs	Chair	Alan Farrell	Fine Gael
Communications, Climate Action and the Environment	Chair	Hildegarde Naughton	Fine Gael
Education and Social Protection	Chair	Fiona O'Loughlin	Fianna Fáil
European Union Affairs	Chair	Michael Healy-Rae	Independent
European Union Affairs	Vice Chair	Terry Leyden	Fianna Fáil
Finance, Public Expenditure and Reform, and Taoiseach	Chair	John McGuinness	Fianna Fáil
Foreign Affairs and Trade, and Defense	Chair	Brendan Smith	Fianna Fáil
Foreign Affairs and Trade, and Defense	Vice Chair	Maureen O'Sullivan	Independent
Future of Healthcare	Chair	Róisín Shortall	Social Democrats
Health	Chair	Michael Harty	Independent
Housing, Planning and Local Government	Chair	Noel Rock	Fine Gael
Housing and Homelessness	Chair	John Curran	Fianna Fáil
Implementation of the Good Friday Agreement	Chair	Kathleen Funchion	Sinn Féin
Irish Language, the Gaeltacht and the Islands	Chair	Catherine Connolly	Independent
Jobs, Enterprise and Innovation	Chair	Mary Butler	Fianna Fáil
Justice and Equality	Chair	Caoimhghín Ó Caoláin	Sinn Féin
Members' Interests of Dáil Éireann	Chair	Maria Bailey	Fine Gael
Petitions	Chair	Seán Sherlock	Labour Party
Procedure and Privileges (Dáil)	Chair	Seán Ó Fearghaíl	Ceann Comhairle
– Sub-Committee on Dáil Reform	Chair	Seán Ó Fearghaíl	Ceann Comhairle
Public Accounts Committee	Chair	Seán Fleming	Fianna Fáil
Public Accounts Committee	Vice Chair	Alan Kelly	Labour Party
Rural Development, Rural Affairs, Arts and the Gaeltacht	Chair	Peadar Tóibín	Sinn Féin
Social Protection	Chair	John Curran	Fianna Fáil
Transport, Tourism and Sport	Chair	Brendan Griffin	Fine Gael

== List of TDs ==
+: Elected for the first time at the 2016 general election.
‡: Previously served as member of the Dáil non-consecutively to the current consecutive terms of office.
#: Member of the 24th Seanad at time of election.
§: Returned automatically without standing for election as outgoing Ceann Comhairle, in accordance with Article 16.6 of the Constitution of Ireland.

This is a list of TDs elected to Dáil Éireann in the 2016 general election. The Changes table below records changes in membership and party affiliation.

Party	Name	Constituency
Fine Gael (50)	Maria Bailey	Dún Laoghaire
Fine Gael (50)	Seán Barrett	Dún Laoghaire
Fine Gael (50)	Pat Breen	Clare
Fine Gael (50)	Colm Brophy	Dublin South-West
Fine Gael (50)	Richard Bruton	Dublin Bay North
Fine Gael (50)	Peter Burke	Longford–Westmeath
Fine Gael (50)	Catherine Byrne	Dublin South-Central
Fine Gael (50)	Ciarán Cannon	Galway East
Fine Gael (50)	Joe Carey	Clare
Fine Gael (50)	Marcella Corcoran Kennedy	Offaly
Fine Gael (50)	Simon Coveney	Cork South-Central
Fine Gael (50)	Michael Creed	Cork North-West
Fine Gael (50)	Jim Daly	Cork South-West
Fine Gael (50)	Michael W. D'Arcy	Wexford
Fine Gael (50)	John Deasy	Waterford
Fine Gael (50)	Pat Deering	Carlow–Kilkenny
Fine Gael (50)	Regina Doherty	Meath East
Fine Gael (50)	Paschal Donohoe	Dublin Central
Fine Gael (50)	Andrew Doyle	Wicklow
Fine Gael (50)	Bernard Durkan	Kildare North
Fine Gael (50)	Damien English	Meath West
Fine Gael (50)	Alan Farrell	Dublin Fingal
Fine Gael (50)	Frances Fitzgerald	Dublin Mid-West
Fine Gael (50)	Peter Fitzpatrick	Louth
Fine Gael (50)	Charles Flanagan	Laois
Fine Gael (50)	Brendan Griffin	Kerry
Fine Gael (50)	Simon Harris	Wicklow
Fine Gael (50)	Martin Heydon	Kildare South
Fine Gael (50)	Heather Humphreys	Cavan–Monaghan
Fine Gael (50)	Paul Kehoe	Wexford
Fine Gael (50)	Enda Kenny	Mayo
Fine Gael (50)	Seán Kyne	Galway West
Fine Gael (50)	Josepha Madigan	Dublin Rathdown
Fine Gael (50)	Helen McEntee	Meath East
Fine Gael (50)	Joe McHugh	Donegal
Fine Gael (50)	Tony McLoughlin	Sligo–Leitrim
Fine Gael (50)	Mary Mitchell O'Connor	Dún Laoghaire
Fine Gael (50)	Dara Murphy	Cork North-Central
Fine Gael (50)	Eoghan Murphy	Dublin Bay South
Fine Gael (50)	Hildegarde Naughton	Galway West
Fine Gael (50)	Tom Neville	Limerick County
Fine Gael (50)	Michael Noonan	Limerick City
Fine Gael (50)	Kate O'Connell	Dublin Bay South
Fine Gael (50)	Patrick O'Donovan	Limerick County
Fine Gael (50)	Fergus O'Dowd	Louth
Fine Gael (50)	John Paul Phelan	Carlow–Kilkenny
Fine Gael (50)	Michael Ring	Mayo
Fine Gael (50)	Noel Rock	Dublin North-West
Fine Gael (50)	David Stanton	Cork East
Fine Gael (50)	Leo Varadkar	Dublin West
Fianna Fáil (44)	Bobby Aylward	Carlow–Kilkenny
Fianna Fáil (44)	John Brassil	Kerry
Fianna Fáil (44)	Declan Breathnach	Louth
Fianna Fáil (44)	James Browne	Wexford
Fianna Fáil (44)	Mary Butler	Waterford
Fianna Fáil (44)	Thomas Byrne	Meath East
Fianna Fáil (44)	Jackie Cahill	Tipperary
Fianna Fáil (44)	Dara Calleary	Mayo
Fianna Fáil (44)	Pat Casey	Wicklow
Fianna Fáil (44)	Shane Cassells	Meath West
Fianna Fáil (44)	Jack Chambers	Dublin West
Fianna Fáil (44)	Lisa Chambers	Mayo
Fianna Fáil (44)	Niall Collins	Limerick County
Fianna Fáil (44)	Barry Cowen	Offaly
Fianna Fáil (44)	John Curran	Dublin Mid-West
Fianna Fáil (44)	Timmy Dooley	Clare
Fianna Fáil (44)	Seán Fleming	Laois
Fianna Fáil (44)	Pat "the Cope" Gallagher	Donegal
Fianna Fáil (44)	Seán Haughey	Dublin Bay North
Fianna Fáil (44)	Billy Kelleher	Cork North-Central
Fianna Fáil (44)	John Lahart	Dublin South-West
Fianna Fáil (44)	James Lawless	Kildare North
Fianna Fáil (44)	Marc MacSharry	Sligo–Leitrim
Fianna Fáil (44)	Micheál Martin	Cork South-Central
Fianna Fáil (44)	Charlie McConalogue	Donegal
Fianna Fáil (44)	Michael McGrath	Cork South-Central
Fianna Fáil (44)	John McGuinness	Carlow–Kilkenny
Fianna Fáil (44)	Aindrias Moynihan	Cork North-West
Fianna Fáil (44)	Michael Moynihan	Cork North-West
Fianna Fáil (44)	Eugene Murphy	Roscommon–Galway
Fianna Fáil (44)	Margaret Murphy O'Mahony	Cork South-West
Fianna Fáil (44)	Darragh O'Brien	Dublin Fingal
Fianna Fáil (44)	Jim O'Callaghan	Dublin Bay South
Fianna Fáil (44)	Éamon Ó Cuív	Galway West
Fianna Fáil (44)	Willie O'Dea	Limerick City
Fianna Fáil (44)	Seán Ó Fearghaíl	Kildare South
Fianna Fáil (44)	Kevin O'Keeffe	Cork East
Fianna Fáil (44)	Fiona O'Loughlin	Kildare South
Fianna Fáil (44)	Frank O'Rourke	Kildare North
Fianna Fáil (44)	Anne Rabbitte	Galway East
Fianna Fáil (44)	Eamon Scanlon	Sligo–Leitrim
Fianna Fáil (44)	Brendan Smith	Cavan–Monaghan
Fianna Fáil (44)	Niamh Smyth	Cavan–Monaghan
Fianna Fáil (44)	Robert Troy	Longford–Westmeath
Sinn Féin (23)	Gerry Adams	Louth
Sinn Féin (23)	John Brady	Wicklow
Sinn Féin (23)	Pat Buckley	Cork East
Sinn Féin (23)	Seán Crowe	Dublin South-West
Sinn Féin (23)	David Cullinane	Waterford
Sinn Féin (23)	Pearse Doherty	Donegal
Sinn Féin (23)	Dessie Ellis	Dublin North-West
Sinn Féin (23)	Martin Ferris	Kerry
Sinn Féin (23)	Kathleen Funchion	Carlow–Kilkenny
Sinn Féin (23)	Martin Kenny	Sligo–Leitrim
Sinn Féin (23)	Mary Lou McDonald	Dublin Central
Sinn Féin (23)	Denise Mitchell	Dublin Bay North
Sinn Féin (23)	Imelda Munster	Louth
Sinn Féin (23)	Carol Nolan	Offaly
Sinn Féin (23)	Caoimhghín Ó Caoláin	Cavan–Monaghan
Sinn Féin (23)	Jonathan O'Brien	Cork North-Central
Sinn Féin (23)	Eoin Ó Broin	Dublin Mid-West
Sinn Féin (23)	Donnchadh Ó Laoghaire	Cork South-Central
Sinn Féin (23)	Louise O'Reilly	Dublin Fingal
Sinn Féin (23)	Aengus Ó Snodaigh	Dublin South-Central
Sinn Féin (23)	Maurice Quinlivan	Limerick City
Sinn Féin (23)	Brian Stanley	Laois
Sinn Féin (23)	Peadar Tóibín	Meath West
Labour Party (7)	Joan Burton	Dublin West
Labour Party (7)	Brendan Howlin	Wexford
Labour Party (7)	Alan Kelly	Tipperary
Labour Party (7)	Jan O'Sullivan	Limerick City
Labour Party (7)	Willie Penrose	Longford–Westmeath
Labour Party (7)	Brendan Ryan	Dublin Fingal
Labour Party (7)	Seán Sherlock	Cork East
AAA–PBP (6)	Richard Boyd Barrett	Dún Laoghaire
AAA–PBP (6)	Mick Barry	Cork North-Central
AAA–PBP (6)	Ruth Coppinger	Dublin West
AAA–PBP (6)	Gino Kenny	Dublin Mid-West
AAA–PBP (6)	Paul Murphy	Dublin South-West
AAA–PBP (6)	Bríd Smith	Dublin South-Central
Independents 4 Change (4)	Tommy Broughan	Dublin Bay North
Independents 4 Change (4)	Joan Collins	Dublin South-Central
Independents 4 Change (4)	Clare Daly	Dublin Fingal
Independents 4 Change (4)	Mick Wallace	Wexford
Social Democrats (3)	Stephen Donnelly	Wicklow
Social Democrats (3)	Catherine Murphy	Kildare North
Social Democrats (3)	Róisín Shortall	Dublin North-West
Green Party (2)	Catherine Martin	Dublin Rathdown
Green Party (2)	Eamon Ryan	Dublin Bay South
Independent (19)	Seán Canney (Note: Campaigned under the banner of the Independent Alliance, but appeared as a normal Independent on the ballot paper.)	Galway East
Independent (19)	Séamus Healy	Tipperary
Independent (19)	Michael Collins	Cork South-West
Independent (19)	Catherine Connolly	Galway West
Independent (19)	Michael Fitzmaurice	Roscommon–Galway
Independent (19)	Noel Grealish	Galway West
Independent (19)	John Halligan	Waterford
Independent (19)	Danny Healy-Rae	Kerry
Independent (19)	Michael Healy-Rae	Kerry
Independent (19)	Michael Harty	Clare
Independent (19)	Michael Lowry	Tipperary
Independent (19)	Finian McGrath	Dublin Bay North
Independent (19)	Mattie McGrath	Tipperary
Independent (19)	Kevin "Boxer" Moran	Longford–Westmeath
Independent (19)	Denis Naughten	Roscommon–Galway
Independent (19)	Maureen O'Sullivan	Dublin Central
Independent (19)	Thomas Pringle	Donegal
Independent (19)	Shane Ross	Dublin Rathdown
Independent (19)	Katherine Zappone	Dublin South-West

== Technical groups ==
In the wake of the 2016 general election, which saw a significant increase in the number of TDs elected as independents or from small parties in the 32nd Dáil, the Dáil standing orders were extensively revised to reduce the minimum number for the formation of a technical group from seven TDs to five, and to allow multiple technical groups to exist in parallel. In January 2018, there were three groups; Independents 4 Change Group (7), Social Democrats–Green Party Group (5) and the Rural Independents Group (7).

=== Independents 4 Change Group ===
Party	Name	Constituency
Independents 4 Change (3)	Joan Collins	Dublin South-Central
Independents 4 Change (3)	Clare Daly	Dublin Fingal
Independents 4 Change (3)	Mick Wallace	Wexford
Independent (4)		
Independent (4)	Tommy Broughan	Dublin Bay North
Independent (4)	Catherine Connolly	Galway West
Independent (4)	Maureen O'Sullivan	Dublin Central
Independent (4)	Thomas Pringle	Donegal

=== Social Democrats–Green Party Group ===
Party	Name	Constituency
Social Democrats (2)	Catherine Murphy	Kildare North
Social Democrats (2)	Róisín Shortall	Dublin North-West
Green Party (2)	Catherine Martin	Dublin Rathdown
Green Party (2)	Eamon Ryan	Dublin Bay South
Independent (1)	Séamus Healy	Tipperary

=== Rural Independents Group ===
Party	Name	Constituency
Independent (7)	Michael Collins	Cork South-West
Independent (7)	Noel Grealish	Galway West
Independent (7)	Danny Healy-Rae	Kerry
Independent (7)	Michael Healy-Rae	Kerry
Independent (7)	Michael Harty	Clare
Independent (7)	Michael Lowry	Tipperary
Independent (7)	Mattie McGrath	Tipperary

== Firsts ==
For the first time, two siblings were elected to Dáil Éireann from the same constituency: Michael and Danny Healy-Rae for Kerry.

Having become the first openly lesbian member of the Oireachtas and the first member in a recognised same-sex relationship with her Seanad nomination in 2011, Katherine Zappone also became the first openly lesbian TD after being elected to the Dáil in 2016, and later the first openly lesbian member of government.

Independents 4 Change, the Social Democrats and Aontú had their first TDs.

On 14 June 2017 Leo Varadkar became the first openly gay Taoiseach.

Malcolm Byrne became the first openly gay man to win a by-election, and the first openly gay Fianna Fáil TD.

== Changes ==
Date	Constituency	Loss	Gain	Note
10 March 2016	Kildare South	Fianna Fáil	Ceann Comhairle	Seán Ó Fearghaíl is elected as Ceann Comhairle
18 May 2016	Roscommon–Galway	Independent Alliance	Independent	Michael Fitzmaurice leaves the Independent Alliance
26 July 2016	Dublin Bay North	Inds. 4 Change	Independent	Tommy Broughan leaves Independents 4 Change
5 September 2016	Wicklow	Social Democrats	Independent	Stephen Donnelly leaves the Social Democrats
2 February 2017	Wicklow	Independent	Fianna Fáil	Stephen Donnelly joins Fianna Fáil
22 March 2018	Offaly	Sinn Féin	Independent	Carol Nolan was suspended from Sinn Féin for voting against legislation to allow for a referendum on repealing the Eighth Amendment She resigned from Sinn Féin in June 2018.
4 May 2018	Roscommon–Galway	Independent Alliance	Independent	Seán Canney leaves the Independent Alliance
2 October 2018	Louth	Fine Gael	Independent	Peter Fitzpatrick resigns from Fine Gael
15 November 2018	Meath West	Sinn Féin	Independent	Peadar Tóibín resigns from Sinn Féin
28 January 2019	Meath West	Independent	Aontú	Peadar Tóibín founds a new political party called Aontú
1 July 2019	Cork North-Central	Fianna Fáil		Resignation of Billy Kelleher after his election to the European Parliament
1 July 2019	Dublin Fingal	Inds. 4 Change		Resignation of Clare Daly after her election to the European Parliament
1 July 2019	Dublin Mid-West	Fine Gael		Resignation of Frances Fitzgerald after her election to the European Parliament
1 July 2019	Wexford	Inds. 4 Change		Resignation of Mick Wallace after his election to the European Parliament
30 November 2019	Cork North-Central		Fianna Fáil	Pádraig O'Sullivan holds the seat vacated by the resignation of Billy Kelleher
30 November 2019	Dublin Fingal		Green	Joe O'Brien gains the seat vacated by the resignation of Clare Daly
30 November 2019	Dublin Mid-West		Sinn Féin	Mark Ward gains the seat vacated by the resignation of Frances Fitzgerald
30 November 2019	Wexford		Fianna Fáil	Malcolm Byrne gains the seat vacated by the resignation of Mick Wallace
3 December 2019	Cork North-Central	Fine Gael		Resignation of Dara Murphy
13 January 2020	Longford–Westmeath	Independent Alliance	Independent	Kevin "Boxer" Moran leaves the Independent Alliance
