= Healy-Rae family =

Political and business family in Ireland

The Healy-Rae family is a political and business family based in the Kilgarvan area of County Kerry in Ireland. The patriarch was Jackie Healy-Rae (1931–2014).

== History ==
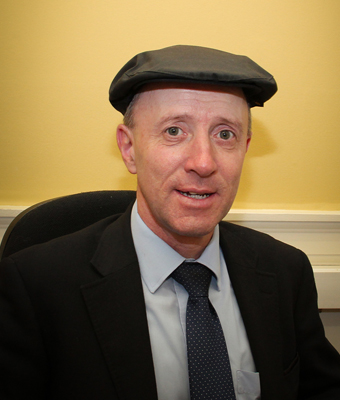
Michael Healy-Rae is nicknamed "Dolly" for mimicking the attributes of his father

Jackie Healy-Rae grew up on a small farm, returned after emigrating to the United States, and developed building-supply and retail businesses. He was a member of Kerry County Council in the Killarney local electoral area (LEA) from 1973 until 2003, as a Fianna Fáil member until the 1997 general election; the party did not select him as a candidate in Kerry South so he ran as an independent and unexpectedly won a seat in the 28th Dáil. At the 1999 local elections his son Michael joined Jackie on the council, representing Killorglin LEA. When the dual mandate was abolished in 2003, Jackie vacated his council seat and another son, Danny, was co-opted in his place. At the 2011 general election, Jackie retired and Michael was elected to the Dáil, with his council seat filled by Danny's son Johnny. At the 2014 Kerry County Council election, Danny retained his Killarney seat while Johnny won in the new South and West Kerry LEA. Just before nominations closed for the 2016 general election, in the enlarged Kerry constituency, Danny joined Michael as a candidate. They ran a united campaign with strict vote management and both were elected. Danny's daughter Maura was co-opted onto the council as his replacement. Michael's parliamentary assistant (PA) is his son Jackie junior; Danny's PA is his wife Eileen, while his secretarial assistant position is job-shared between his daughter Elaine and Johnny's wife Caroline O'Mahony. At the 2019 Kerry County Council election, Maura and Johnny stood for re-election in the Killarney and Kenmare LEAs respectively, while Jackie junior stood in Castleisland LEA. All three were elected. The two TDs and three councillors appear together on The Late Late Show on 31 May 2019. Jackie junior remains Danny's PA while serving as councillor. At the 2024 Kerry County Council election, Maura, Jackie Junior and Johnny Healy-Rae were re-elected.

On 25 November 2019, Jackie and his younger brother Kevin were convicted of assault causing harm at a chip van in Kenmare on 28 December 2017; they received suspended jail sentences of eight and seven months respectively.

== Policies and image ==
The Healy-Raes are clientelist: Jackie gave confidence and supply support to Fianna-Fáil-led governments of 1997–2002 and 2007–2011 in return for pork barrel funding for South Kerry. Opponents characterise them as gombeens, and news media have criticised them as populist and lacking any ideology, while supporters portray them as standing up to the metropolitan elites in Dublin. Jackie (throughout his Dáil career) and Michael (in the 31st Dáil) chose not to join the technical group to which independent TDs are entitled to speaking time in the Dail. The Healy-Raes' main rivals for votes in Kerry are Fianna Fáil candidates. However, Healy-Rae TDs have backed Fianna Fáil led governments on three occasions.

Outside the Dáil chamber, Jackie was always seen wearing a trademark flat cap in public; though Danny appears bare-headed, Michael has carried on the tradition, and in February 2017 was permitted to wear it in the Dáil chamber. Michael was nicknamed "Dolly", after the cloned sheep, for being similar to his father; journalist Shane Hegarty enumerated "[t]he flat cap, the mannerisms, the political ambition, the linguistic trickery, the neck". A Fine Gael election strategy document leaked in 2015 described Michael as 'someone who hides behind "the veneer of a friendly/simple country yokel" but who is "unbeatable electorally"'. After the 2016 election, Michael and Danny aligned themselves with other rural independents during separate negotiations with Fine Gael and Fianna Fáil. Michael publicly proposed creation of a Minister for Rural Affairs, while playing down media suggestions he himself might take the position. When the 32nd Dáil changed Dáil standing orders to allow multiple technical groups, Michael and Danny joined the Rural Alliance technical group.

In 2008, the Irish Times likened the Healy Raes to the mafia, calling the family “the well honed Healy Rae political mafia,” with former Ceann Comhairle and Kerry TD John O’Donoghue claiming that there was "a tinge of the Cosa Nostra'' in one of Jackie Healy-Rae's requests in relation to election boundaries.

In a 2011 edition of Irish Political Studies, an example of assistance from one of the family members was cited by one voter as a reason for supporting them; "I need a track machine to clear a drain and Johnny had it down to me with a driver in two days, all free." Ahead of the 2020 general election, British newspaper The Guardian commented that "the family has elevated patronage and personal connection – venerable traditions in Irish politics – to high art." On the electoral success of Jackie, it wrote that he "distilled the Kerry-man archetype – flat cap, melodic accent, folksy phraseology – into a potent formula."

== See also ==
- Families in the Oireachtas
