= R570 road =

R570 road may refer to:

- R570 road (Ireland)
- R570 (South Africa)
