= R569 road (Ireland) =

Regional road in County Kerry, Ireland

R569 road
- Bóthar R569
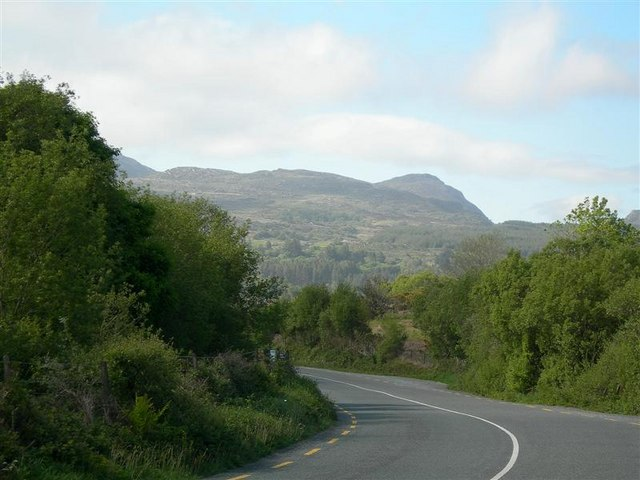
- R569 near Morley's Bridge

Route information
- Length: 25.0 km (15.5 mi)

Major junctions
- From: N71 at Main Street, Kenmare, County Kerry
- To: N22 at Poulgorm Bridge

Location
- Country: Ireland

Highway system
- Roads in Ireland; Motorways; Primary; Secondary; Regional
| ← R568 | → R570 |

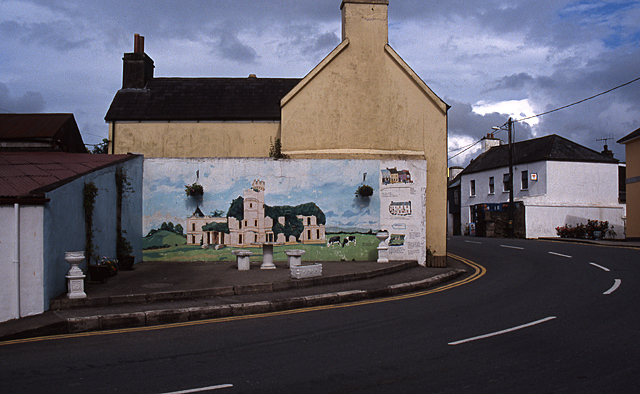
Mural in Kilgarvan on the R569

The R569 road is a regional road in County Kerry, Ireland. It travels from the N71 road at Kenmare to the N22, via the village of Kilgarvan. The road follows the course of the Roughty River for the greater part of its route. The R569 is 25.0 kilometres (15.5 mi) long.
