= Kilgarvan =

Village in County Kerry, Ireland

Kilgarvan Cill Gharbháin
- Village
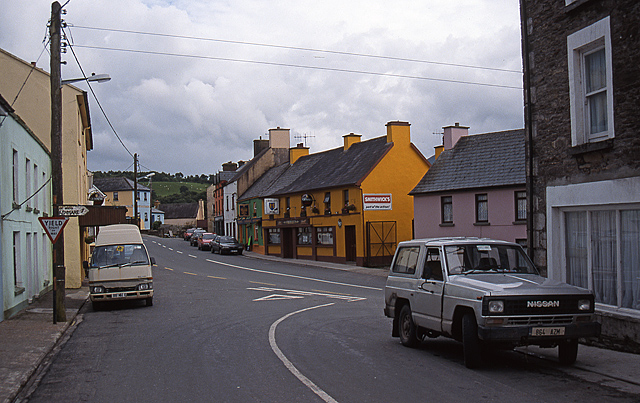

- Location in Ireland
- Coordinates: 51°54′15″N 9°26′12″W
- Country: Ireland
- Province: Munster
- County: County Kerry
- Barony: Glanarought

Population (2022)
  - Total: 264
- Time zone: UTC+0 (WET)
  - Summer (DST): UTC-1 (IST (WEST))
- Irish Grid Reference: W007733

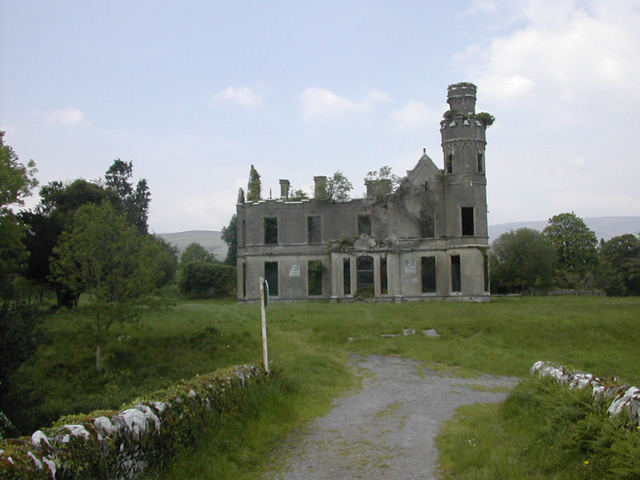
Ruins of Ardtully House outside Kilgarvan

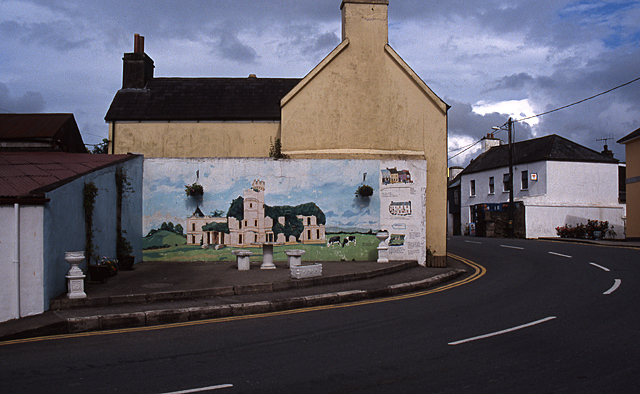
Mural painting of Ardtully House on Kilgaravan Main Street

Kilgarvan (Irish: Cill Gharbháin, meaning 'Garvan's church') is a small village in the south of County Kerry in Ireland. It is situated on the banks of the Roughty River which flows into Kenmare Bay. The nearest town is Kenmare which is 11 km to the west along the R569 road. Killarney is 18 km to the north (but 30 km by road). Kilgarvan is part of the civil parish of the same name.

== History ==
Kilgarvan is a village in southeast County Kerry near the Cork boundary. Kilgarvan was the site of the Battle of Callann in 1261 which reduced Norman power in Ireland for almost 300 years. The battle site is located in the townland of Callann (pronounced Collon).

Nearby the town are the ruins of "Ardtully House". This house was built in a castle style by the wealthy landowner Sir Richard John Theodore Orpen (1788-1876), Knight of Ardtully, in 1847. It replaced a number of earlier structures, dating as far back as 1215. It was associated with a number of families including Carew, McCarthy, Dillon, Babbington and Conway. Only ruins remain as it was burned down in 1921 during the Irish War of Independence. Directions on how to find the Castle are painted on the wall of a house on Main Street in Kilgarvan.

== Housing development ==
Kilgarvan has seen property development during recent years, probably to meet housing demand from those seeking an alternative to higher prices in nearby towns. A number of new housing estates were built around the village in recent times.

The population of Kilgarvan fell from 175 in 1996 to 156 in 2002. However, 2006 saw an increase to 164. As of the 2022 census, the population was 264, an increased from 2016 census population of 172.

Kilgarvan has no local industry.

Kilgarvan's sewage treatment plant was constructed in 1936, near the Roughty River. According to the Kerry County Council, the lack of sufficient sewage treatment may represent "a constraint on development in the village" until a new plant is completed. A new sewerage treatment plant was planned for Kilgarvan, with phase one planned to begin in late 2008.

== Amenities ==
Kilgarvan is home to a Coillte Millennium Forest at Rossacroo-na-loo. It is also home to a motor museum with a collection of vintage and classic cars.

Kilgarvan is located between Kenmare and Killarney, and was expected to see the introduction of broadband access during 2009. The roadway through the village forms part of the R569 regional road from Kenmare to Poulgorm Bridge.

== Sport ==
Gaelic games, including hurling and Gaelic football, are played in Kilgarvan, with Kilgarvan GAA fielding several teams in a season. Kilgarvan retained its intermediate title in 2007 and made history by becoming the first Kerry hurling team to win a Munster Club hurling game at any level in over forty years. Kilgarvan continued in the Munster Junior Club Hurling Championship in 2008 and reached the Munster final becoming the first Kerry hurling team ever to do so. Kilgarvan has its own GAA pitch and facilities including an all weather training track and dressing rooms, extensive drainage work was carried out on the pitch in 2008.

== Events ==
The Annual Kilgarvan Show is held on the Sunday of the August Bank Holiday Weekend. The show has been held in the Fussa Townland since 2007, having previously been held in the local GAA grounds. Recent wet summers in Ireland have seen many shows cancelled and Kilgarvan Show had to be rescheduled in 2007 as a result of the wet weather.

== Energy ==
A number of wind turbines have been built in the Parish of Kilgarvan, all concentrated in the Incheese/top of Coom area close to the County bounds with Cork. Some claim that the turbines have caused disruption to television reception in Kilgarvan. When these turbines are fully completed, Kilgarvan will be home to the largest onshore wind turbine project in Ireland.

== People ==
- Keith Harrington: Irish hurler, born in Kilgarvan.
- Michael J. Quill (1905–1966): Was born in Kilgarvan, New York Labour leader, founder of the Transport Workers Union of America.
- Máirín Quill (*1936): Former politician who served as a TD and Senator for the Progressive Democrats is originally from Kilgarvan.
- Sir Richard John Theodore Orpen (1788-1876): Since 1868 Knight of Tully, was one of the principal lessors in the parishes of Kenmare and Kilgravan. In the 1870s his estate amounted to over 12,000 acres in county Kerry as well as 300 acres in county Cork. He built "Ardtully House" in 1847 outside Kilgarvan.
- Healy-Rae: Kilgarvan is the base of the Healy-Rae family, which owns several local businesses. Patriarch Jackie was succeeded as a Teachta Dála by his sons Danny and Michael.

== Film ==
Kilgarvan was featured in The Wind That Shakes the Barley which was shot primarily in Cork but featured a part filmed in Muing Mhór (Meeng Voor,) near the top of Borlin in Kilgarvan.

== Transport ==
Bus Éireann operates bus services through Kilgarvan as part of its varied routes. Killarney railway station is the closest rail link to Kilgarvan. The closest airports to Kilgarvan are Kerry Airport which is 30 miles (48 km) away and Cork Airport which is 54 miles (87 km) away. Further away are Shannon Airport which is 104 miles (168 km) away and Dublin Airport which is 204 miles (328 km) away.

Kilgarvan railway station opened on 4 September 1893 and closed on 31 December 1959.

=== Drunk driving controversy ===
A motion passed by the Kerry County Council during the winter of 2012-2013 requested that the minister for justice allow the police to "issue permits to people living in rural isolated areas to allow them to drive home from their nearest pub after having two or three drinks on little-used roads driving at very low speeds."

The motion was made by Danny Healy-Rae, a local politician and pub owner. He stated the measure was intended to reverse the decline of rural pub culture and address older residents' isolation.

Wide comment in the media characterised the motion as legalising drunk driving.

== See also ==
- List of towns and villages in Ireland
