= Toiréasa Ferris =

Barrister and former Sinn Féin politician

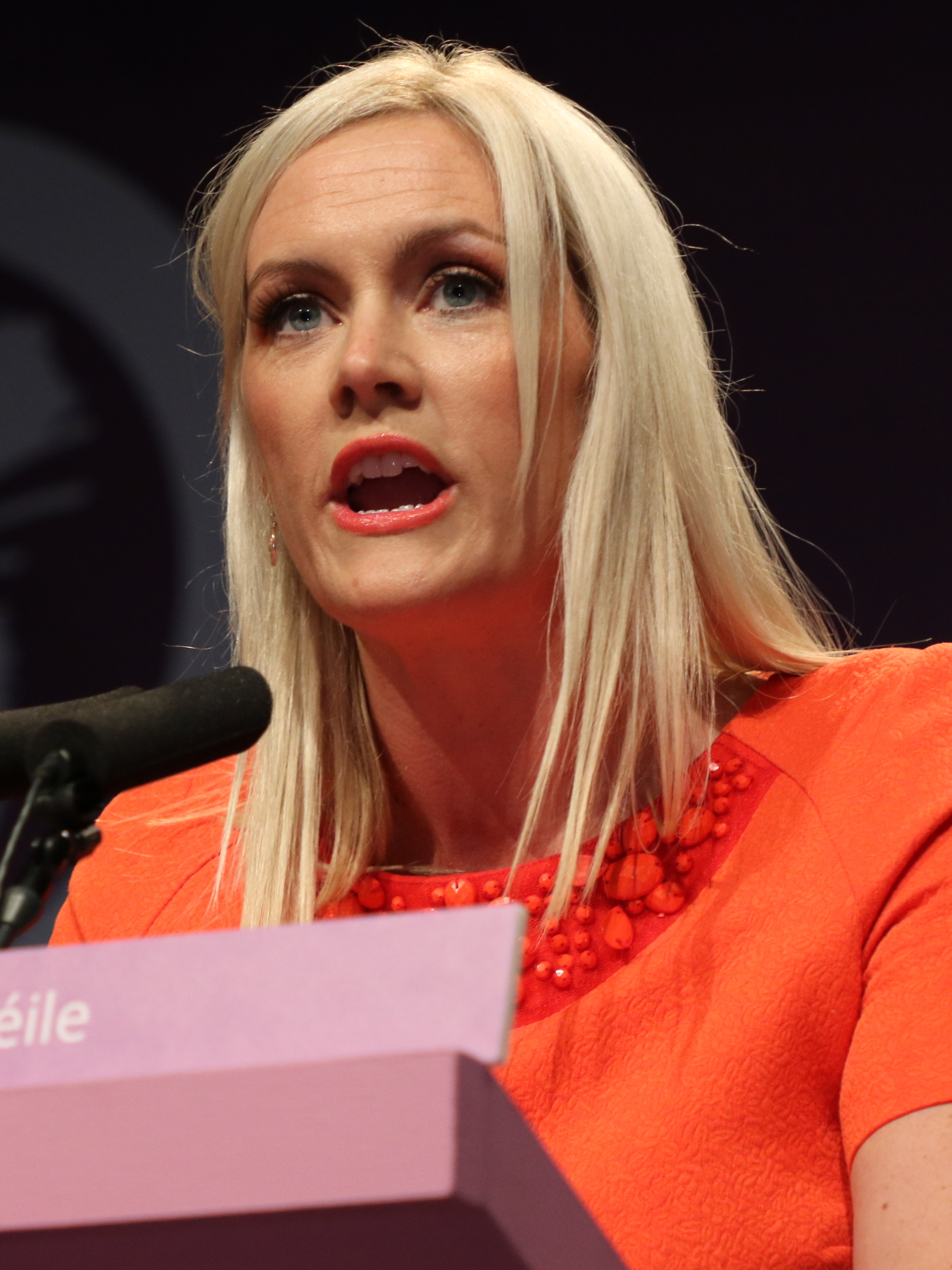
- Ferris in 2017

Kerry County Councillor
- In office August 2003 – August 2019
- Constituency: Tralee

Personal details
- Born: 24 March 1980 (age 46) Tralee, County Kerry, Ireland
- Party: Sinn Féin
- Spouse: Patrick Kelly (m. 2009)
- Children: 3
- Parent: Martin Ferris (father)
- Education: University of Limerick; Queen's University Belfast

Toiréasa Ferris (born 24 March 1980) is an Irish former Sinn Féin politician who has served as a Kerry County Councillor for Tralee from 2003 to 2019.

== Personal life ==
Ferris is a part-time tutor in law at Tralee Community College. She lives in Ardfert, County Kerry with her husband Patrick and their two children. In 2001, Ferris spent seven months working in Mexico with a local workers' rights group.

== Political career ==
Ferris started her political activism with Sinn Féin's youth wing Ógra Shinn Féin, in her native Tralee and at the University of Limerick. Co-opted in 2003 to the Kerry County Council seat held by her father, Martin Ferris, she immediately became the first Sinn Féin Cathaoirleach (chairperson) of the council. She was elected to the Council in 2004, and became the second female Mayor of the Council in 2005, serving until 2006.

On 18 October 2008, she was selected as a candidate in the European Parliament election in 2009 for the South constituency. She received 64,671 of the first preference votes, coming third on the first count, but was not elected. In an article in the weekly newspaper An Phoblacht she gave an analysis of the current direction of the party, saying that the party "means nothing" to the bulk of people in the Republic, and that there was a perception amongst voters that Sinn Féin was a northern-based party.

In the 2014 Kerry County Council election, Ferris was elected on the first count and topped the poll in the Tralee local electoral area. She retained her seat in 2019. The following month she ruled herself out of standing in the next general election on medical advice, while remaining on the county council. She resigned from the council on health grounds in August 2019.

== The Late Late Show interview ==
Ferris appeared on RTÉ's The Late Late Show in February 2006; in an interview with Pat Kenny, she said she could not condemn the killing of Garda Jerry McCabe in 1996. She stated that "It wouldn't be fair to condemn one individual action when over 3,000 were killed [in The Troubles]. I don't feel I have the right, or that it would be fair to condemn one individual act." The Late Late Show interview also caused comment because her "knee-length" skirt hiked up when she crossed her legs. RTÉ was sharply criticised for having their cameras pan her legs and skirt in the middle of the interview and creating a "tabloid" atmosphere and cheapening her appearance.

Fine Gael councillors on Kerry County Council attempted to table a vote of no confidence. However, owing to the support of Fianna Fáil councillors, she survived by a wide margin.
