= Michael Healy-Rae =

Irish politician (born 1967)

Michael Healy-Rae TD
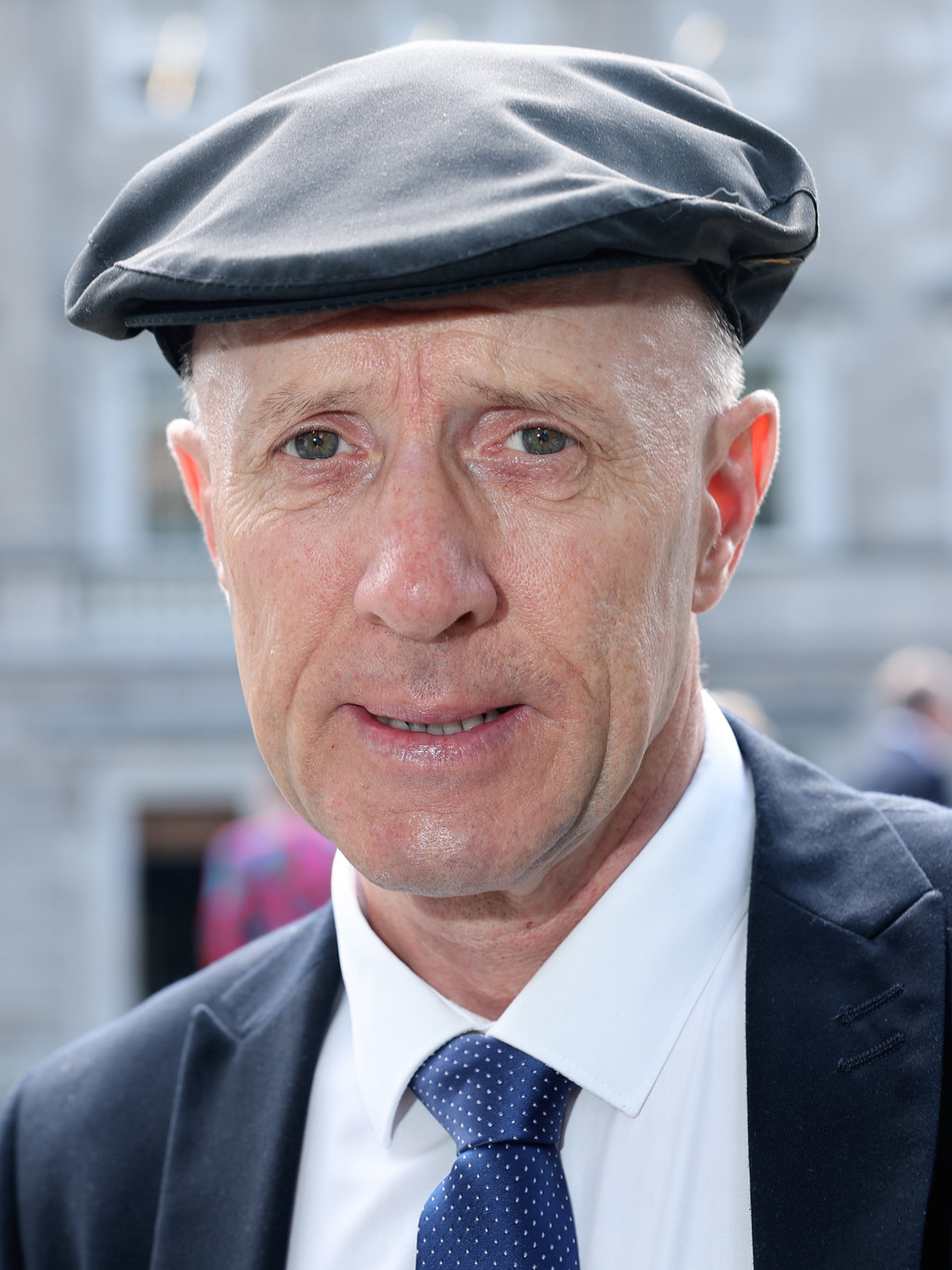
- Healy-Rae in 2023

Minister of State
- 2025–2026: Agriculture, Food and the Marine

Chair of the Committee on European Union Affairs
- In office 4 April 2016 – 15 September 2020
- Preceded by: Dominic Hannigan
- Succeeded by: Joe McHugh

Teachta Dála
- Incumbent
- Assumed office February 2016
- Constituency: Kerry
- In office February 2011 – February 2016
- Constituency: Kerry South

Kerry County Councillor
- In office June 1999 – February 2011
- Constituency: Killorglin

Personal details
- Born: 9 January 1967 (age 59) Kilgarvan, County Kerry, Ireland
- Party: Independent
- Spouse: Eileen Healy-Rae (m. 1989)
- Children: 5
- Parent: Jackie Healy-Rae (father)
- Relatives: Danny Healy-Rae (brother)
- Education: Limerick Institute of Technology

Michael J. Healy-Rae (born 9 January 1967) is an Irish independent politician who has been a Teachta Dála (TD) for the Kerry constituency since 2016, and from 2011 to 2016 for the Kerry South constituency. He served as a Minister of State from January 2025 until his resignation in April 2026. He served as chair of the Committee on European Union Affairs from 2016 to 2020.

Before entering national politics, he was involved in local politics in County Kerry and pursued business interests.

== Family life ==
He is the youngest son of Jackie Healy-Rae, who was a TD for Kerry South from 1997 to 2011; and the brother of Danny Healy-Rae, who is also a TD. His mother, Julie Healy, was born in Wilmington, Delaware, U.S., but grew up in New York City. He has 5 children, two of whom were found guilty and convicted of assault charges in 2019. His son, Jackie Healy-Rae Jnr, was elected as a councillor for Castleisland local electoral area at the 2019 Kerry County Council election.

== Local politics ==
Healy-Rae was first elected at the 1999 Kerry County Council for the local electoral area of Killorglin. He retained his seat with an increased vote at the 2004 Kerry County Council election. He served on the council until his election to the Dáil in 2011.

== Reality television ==
In autumn 2007, Michael Healy-Rae took part in a reality television show on RTÉ called Celebrities Go Wild, set in the "unforgiving landscapes" of Connemara, County Galway. He emerged as the winner, having received the largest number of votes from the "viewing public". In June 2011, news broke of a voting scandal, for which journalist Senan Molony received the award for "Scoop of the Year" at the National Newspapers of Ireland's Journalism Awards. It was revealed that Healy-Rae had received 3,636 votes from a phone in Leinster House, at a cost of €2,600 to the Irish taxpayer, the premium-rate calls being charged a tariff designed to raise money for charity. Only limited information was available as to how the calls were made. Speculation that an automated dialler had been employed was discounted by the Irish Independent, which suggested they were made over 31 hours using "redial". The Ceann Comhairle Seán Barrett, described it as "an outrageous abuse of facilities", while the Taoiseach Enda Kenny said the money spent on the calls should be paid back. On 29 June 2011, Healy-Rae said that while he was not involved in the calls, he would pay the money back.

In October 2017, Healy-Rae appeared on Livin' with Lucy.

== National politics ==
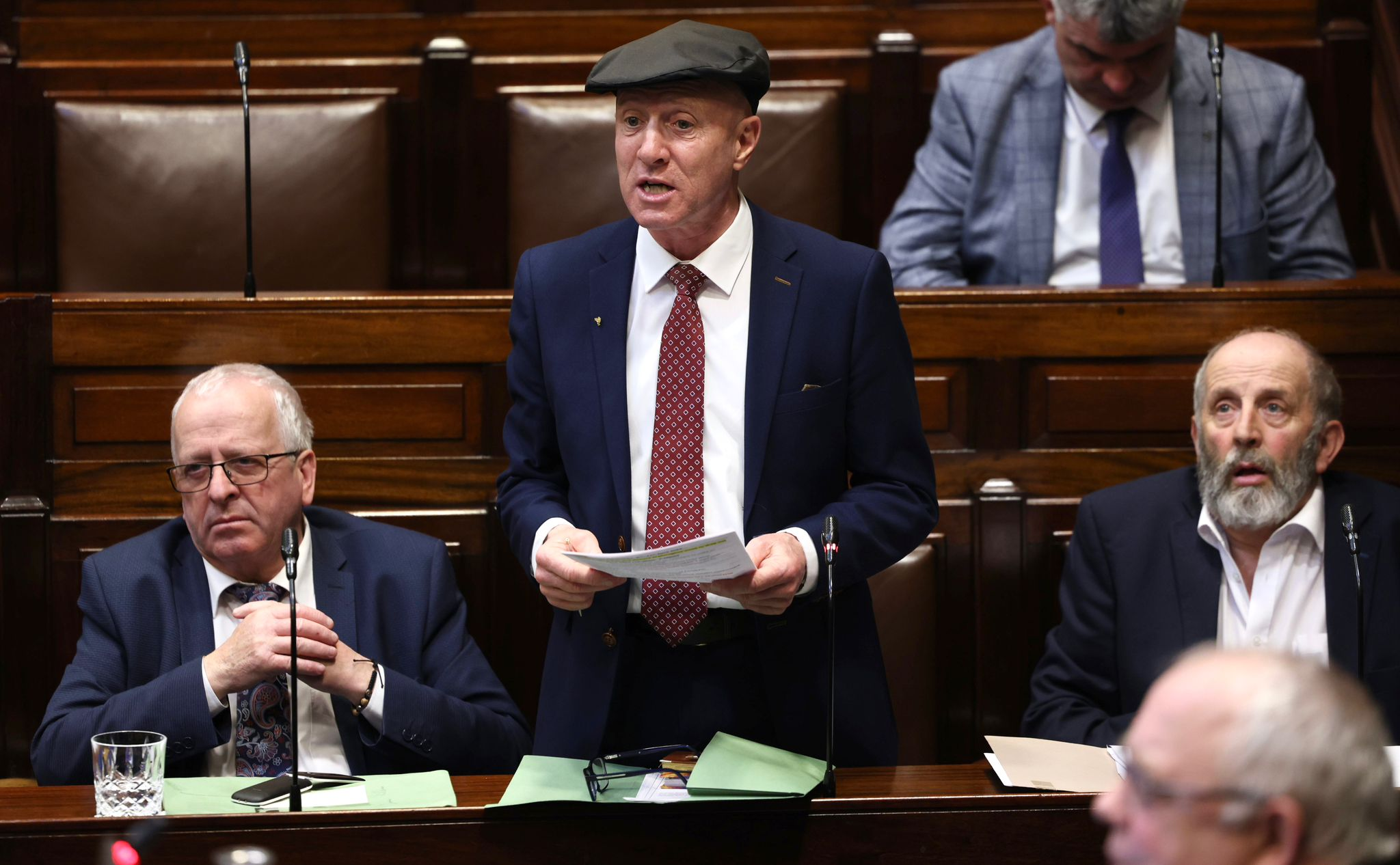
Healy-Rae speaking in the Dáil in 2024

Healy-Rae was elected for Kerry South at the 2011 general election, when his father Jackie retired. He, like fellow Independents Michael Lowry and Noel Grealish, were not members of the Technical group in the 31st Dáil. He missed two-thirds of votes in his first Dáil term, despite being signed in for his expenses on each day a vote was taken.

Healy-Rae had been appointed to the board of the Citizens' Information Board in April 2009. He was asked twice to resign his position from the board because of a conflict of interest between his subsequent membership of the Dáil and his membership of a body advising the Minister for Social Protection. After he refused to resign, the Minister dismissed him in July 2011.

On 9 December 2011, having earlier participated in a debate on social welfare, he took ill at Leinster House and was advised to leave the Dáil chamber. Health minister James Reilly, a medical doctor, tended to him outside the chamber, he was brought from Leinster House on a stretcher, placed in an ambulance and rushed to St. James's Hospital.

Healy-Rae has raised The Hum in Dáil Éireann after witnessing it himself while meeting some of his constituents who were "nearly gone out of their minds" with it. The official response he received, was described by Healy-Rae as "away with the fairies gobbledygook."

He topped the poll in Kerry at the 2016 general election; his brother Danny was elected alongside him. This was the first time that two siblings were elected to the Dáil for the same constituency. A short while later, on the evening of 20 March 2016, Michael Healy-Rae experienced being unintentionally "tossed around by a cow" who was after calving in a shed at his farm near Kilgarvan. He was taken to hospital with his injuries.

At the 2020 general election, he topped the poll again, and was re-elected on the first count.

In May 2020, he called for the Leaving Certificate exams in 2020 to be cancelled due to COVID-19, in contrast to his brother Danny who said that the exams should go ahead in 2020 with proper social distancing, possibly using public buildings such as community centres and libraries.

On 9 April 2024, following the resignation of Leo Varadkar as Taoiseach, Michael was nominated for the position by his brother, Danny Healy-Rae. He was the only candidate to oppose Simon Harris, who was elected by 88 votes to 69.

At the 2024 general election, Healy-Rae was re-elected to the Dáil, topping the poll in Kerry.

In January 2025, Healy-Rae was appointed Minister of State with special responsibility for forestry, at the Department of Agriculture, Food and the Marine. Accepting the position, he stated that he would stick with the Government "through thick and thin". On 14 April 2026, in the aftermath of the fuel protests, he resigned as a minister of state, saying the government had lost touch with the people.

On 16 September 2026, Healy-Rae was hospitalised with non life-threatening injuries after he was assaulted in Dublin that afternoon.

== Political views ==
His political platform includes opposition to tighter controls on drinking and driving. His father and brother have also expressed similar views on such legislation. In 2018 Healy-Rae stated that he did not believe Ireland had a major alcohol problem, countering claims from anti-alcohol campaigners highlighting the country's position as 20th in alcohol consumption within the OECD. Healy-Rae has defended Irish pub culture, seeing it as an important social space for conversation and community.

In January 2012, Healy-Rae proposed changing Ireland's number plate system so that the supposedly unlucky number 13 would be dropped for the year 2013 to save the Irish car industry.

On social issues, Healy-Rae was opposed to the smoking ban, arguing that elderly smokers were forced outside in harsh conditions. On cannabis, Healy-Rae expressed support for its medicinal use but remained opposed to its legalisation for recreational purposes. He has also criticised the Swedish model of criminalising the purchase of sex, asserting that the protection of individuals working in the sex trade was paramount, though he refrained from offering a definitive stance on the legislation itself.

Healy-Rae voted against same-sex marriage in the 2015 referendum. He stated that his decision was based on personal conviction rather than animosity towards the LGBT community, emphasising that he had never intended to impose his views on others. Healy-Rae has maintained that he prefers children to be raised in a traditional family structure, though he acknowledged the complexity of family dynamics. He was also opposed to same-sex couples adopting children.

Healy-Rae opposes abortion, including in circumstances such as rape. He also opposed euthanasia, citing a belief that only God should decide the time of death.

== Property development ==
In February 2018, Healy-Rae listed 11 properties for letting or rental and two either being renovated or awaiting planning permission in the register of TDs' interests.

In March 2020, it was reported that he had added three properties to his portfolio in the 2019 Register of Members' interests, bringing the number of properties to 21. The three new properties include a house in Clonkeen for which purchase was going through contract stage, a house in Tralee at the same stage and a property in Kilgarvan that is in the process of being renovated.

In May 2020, he was refused planning permission to convert the ground floor of Nancy Myles Pub in the Ballymullen area of Tralee. The plan was for four apartments and had met with strong local opposition. The council's decision was appealed by a number of locals and a conservation organisation. The majority of the decision to refuse was based on the grounds that the proposal would not allow the residents enough natural light or amenity standards. It was the second time the appeals board has overturned a decision by Kerry County Council to grant him a change of use for the pub.

In February 2021 the Register of Members Interests was published, covering 2020, revealing that he remained the largest landlord in the Dáil, with 5 plots of land, 16 properties. A quarter of TDs are landlords or property investors.

In March 2025, the 2024 Register of Members Interests was published, where Healy-Rae declared himself the owner of almost 30 properties of land including houses owned for rental purposes, as well as contracts with the Department of Integration for accommodating Ukrainian refugees and a HAP contract with Kerry County Council.

== Other business interests ==
He has listed in the register of TDs interests that he is a postmaster, farmer, plant hire business operator and shop owner. His plant-hire business has worked for the Health Service Executive and he has a contract for providing fuel to Kerry County Council. In March 2026, he was reported as being Ireland's richest TD.

In May 2020, a complaint was lodged with the clerk of the Dáil over his failure to declare his interest in The Skellig Hotel Experience, a company that ran the Skellig Star Hotel in Cahersiveen. He had a 25% share in the company after investing €25,000 in January 2019, but there was no entry for his shareholding on the Oireachtas Register of Interests. Oireachtas members are required to declare any shareholding over €13,000. When controversy over the leasing of the hotel Michael Healy-Rae said that he was not involved in the leasing of the hotel, but he later accepted the Skellig Hotel Experience held the lease.

The company was sold in December 2019 to Paul Collins who runs direct provision centres. Michael Healy-Rae was adamant that he had no knowledge that it would be converted into a direct provision centre.

== Other ==
In December 2019, he was transferred to hospital after a fire at his shop.

== Publications ==
- Time to Talk: Stories from the Heart of Ireland. Ireland: Gill. 2018.
- A Listening Ear: More Stories from the Heart of Ireland. Ireland: Gill. 2019.

Political offices
Preceded by Pippa Hackett; Martin Heydon	Minister of State at the Department of Agriculture, Food and the Marine; 2025–2026; With: Noel Grealish; Timmy Dooley	Succeeded by Niall Collins; Noel Grealish; Timmy Dooley

Dáil	Election	Deputy (Party)	Deputy (Party)	Deputy (Party)
9th	1937	John Flynn (FF)	Frederick Crowley (FF)	Fionán Lynch (FG)
10th	1938	John Flynn (FF)	Frederick Crowley (FF)	Fionán Lynch (FG)
11th	1943	John Healy (FF)	Frederick Crowley (FF)	Fionán Lynch (FG)
12th	1944	John Healy (FF)	Frederick Crowley (FF)	Fionán Lynch (FG)
12th	1944 by-election	John Healy (FF)	Frederick Crowley (FF)	Donal O'Donoghue (FF)
12th	1945 by-election	John Healy (FF)	Honor Crowley (FF)	Donal O'Donoghue (FF)
13th	1948	John Flynn (Ind.)	Honor Crowley (FF)	Patrick Palmer (FG)
14th	1951	John Flynn (Ind.)	Honor Crowley (FF)	Patrick Palmer (FG)
15th	1954	John Flynn (FF)	Honor Crowley (FF)	Patrick Palmer (FG)
16th	1957	John Joe Rice (SF)	Honor Crowley (FF)	Patrick Palmer (FG)
17th	1961	Timothy O'Connor (FF)	Honor Crowley (FF)	Patrick Connor (FG)
18th	1965	Timothy O'Connor (FF)	Honor Crowley (FF)	Patrick Connor (FG)
18th	1966 by-election	Timothy O'Connor (FF)	John O'Leary (FF)	Patrick Connor (FG)
19th	1969	Timothy O'Connor (FF)	John O'Leary (FF)	Michael Begley (FG)
20th	1973	Timothy O'Connor (FF)	John O'Leary (FF)	Michael Begley (FG)
21st	1977	Timothy O'Connor (FF)	John O'Leary (FF)	Michael Begley (FG)
22nd	1981	Michael Moynihan (Lab)	John O'Leary (FF)	Michael Begley (FG)
23rd	1982 (Feb)	Michael Moynihan (Lab)	John O'Leary (FF)	Michael Begley (FG)
24th	1982 (Nov)	Michael Moynihan (Lab)	John O'Leary (FF)	Michael Begley (FG)
25th	1987	John O'Donoghue (Note: O'Donoghue served as Ceann Comhairle in the 30th Dáil from 2007 to 2009.) (FF)	John O'Leary (FF)	Michael Begley (FG)
26th	1989	John O'Donoghue (FF)	John O'Leary (FF)	Michael Moynihan (Lab)
27th	1992	John O'Donoghue (FF)	John O'Leary (FF)	Breeda Moynihan-Cronin (Lab)
28th	1997	John O'Donoghue (FF)	Jackie Healy-Rae (Ind.)	Breeda Moynihan-Cronin (Lab)
29th	2002	John O'Donoghue (FF)	Jackie Healy-Rae (Ind.)	Breeda Moynihan-Cronin (Lab)
30th	2007	John O'Donoghue (FF)	Jackie Healy-Rae (Ind.)	Tom Sheahan (FG)
31st	2011	Tom Fleming (Ind.)	Michael Healy-Rae (Ind.)	Brendan Griffin (FG)
32nd	2016	Constituency abolished. See Kerry		

Dáil	Election	Deputy (Party)	Deputy (Party)	Deputy (Party)	Deputy (Party)	Deputy (Party)	Deputy (Party)	Deputy (Party)
4th	1923	Tom McEllistrim (Rep)	Austin Stack (Rep)	Patrick Cahill (Rep)	Thomas O'Donoghue (Rep)	James Crowley (CnaG)	Fionán Lynch (CnaG)	John O'Sullivan (CnaG)
5th	1927 (Jun)	Tom McEllistrim (FF)	Austin Stack (SF)	William O'Leary (FF)	Thomas O'Reilly (FF)	James Crowley (CnaG)	Fionán Lynch (CnaG)	John O'Sullivan (CnaG)
6th	1927 (Sep)	Tom McEllistrim (FF)	Frederick Crowley (FF)	William O'Leary (FF)	Thomas O'Reilly (FF)	James Crowley (CnaG)	Fionán Lynch (CnaG)	John O'Sullivan (CnaG)
7th	1932	Tom McEllistrim (FF)	Frederick Crowley (FF)	John Flynn (FF)	Thomas O'Reilly (FF)	Eamon Kissane (FF)	Fionán Lynch (CnaG)	John O'Sullivan (CnaG)
8th	1933	Tom McEllistrim (FF)	Frederick Crowley (FF)	John Flynn (FF)	Denis Daly (FF)	Eamon Kissane (FF)	Fionán Lynch (CnaG)	John O'Sullivan (CnaG)
9th	1937	Constituency abolished. See Kerry North and Kerry South						

Dáil	Election	Deputy (Party)	Deputy (Party)	Deputy (Party)	Deputy (Party)	Deputy (Party)
32nd	2016	Martin Ferris (SF)	Michael Healy-Rae (Ind.)	Danny Healy-Rae (Ind.)	John Brassil (FF)	Brendan Griffin (FG)
33rd	2020	Pa Daly (SF)	Michael Healy-Rae (Ind.)	Danny Healy-Rae (Ind.)	Norma Foley (FF)	Brendan Griffin (FG)
34th	2024	Pa Daly (SF)	Michael Healy-Rae (Ind.)	Danny Healy-Rae (Ind.)	Norma Foley (FF)	Michael Cahill (FF)
