= Jackie Healy-Rae =

Irish politician (1931–2014)

Teachta Dála
- In office June 1997 – February 2011
- Constituency: Kerry South

Personal details
- Born: John Patrick Healy; 9 March 1931 Kilgarvan, County Kerry, Ireland
- Died: 5 December 2014 (aged 83) Tralee, County Kerry, Ireland
- Party: Independent
- Other political affiliations: Fianna Fáil (until 1997)
- Spouse: Julie Healy-Rae (m. 1953)
- Children: 6, including Danny and Michael

John Patrick Healy (9 March 1931 – 5 December 2014), known as Jackie Healy-Rae, was an Irish independent politician who served as a Teachta Dála (TD) for the Kerry South constituency from 1997 to 2011.

== Early and private life ==
Healy-Rae was the first of six children born to Daniel and Mary Healy, and grew up on his family's farm at the foot of Mangerton Mountain, near Kilgarvan in County Kerry. The Rae part of his surname came from the name of the Healys' farm, Reacashlagh. He was educated at the local National School in Kilgarvan. He emigrated to the United States in 1953 but soon returned to Ireland. He played for the local hurling and Gaelic football teams in Kilgarvan, where he won two senior county hurling titles with the club in 1956 and 1958.

Healy-Rae was also a saxophone player with the Kilgarvan Dance Band. By the 1960s, he was well established in the plant hire business in south Kerry. In 1969, he became a publican when he purchased an old premises that had been closed for some time in Kilgarvan. The family pub is now run by his son, Danny.

Healy-Rae was married to Julie Healy, but the couple separated in 1977. Two sons, Danny and Michael were members of Kerry County Council for the Killarney and Killorglin local electoral areas respectively before becoming TDs. His eldest daughter Joan (Mrs. Larkin) teaches in a Catholic School in New York. His other daughter, Rosemary, is a barrister-at-law. She was appointed to a paid position on the Criminal Injuries Compensation Tribunal in 2007. She was re-appointed, for three further years, by Justice Minister Dermot Ahern on 11 November 2010. A son, Denis, runs his own business, and another son, John Healy (he does not use Rae), is a full-time official with and former President of the Garda Representative Association. Three of his grandchildren, Jackie, Johnny and Maura Healy-Rae, are elected members of Kerry County Council for the Castleisland, Kenmare and Killarney local electoral areas respectively.

== Political career ==
=== Early involvement ===
Healy-Rae first became involved in politics in the 1960s. He headed several Fianna Fáil by-election campaigns, most notably the election of John O'Leary to the Dáil in 1966. O'Leary retained the seat for thirty-one years. Healy-Rae later lent his services to several other Fianna Fáil election campaigns in County Limerick, County Cork and County Galway. In 1973, Healy-Rae was first co-opted to Kerry County Council as a Fianna Fáil member, following the death of sitting councillor Michael Doherty. He was elected to the council in his own right in 1974 and re-elected at every subsequent election. Healy-Rae served on the council for 30 years, until he resigned his seat because of the abolition of the dual mandate in 2003.

During the 1970s and 1980s, Healy-Rae served three times as Fianna Fáil's director of elections in Kerry South. In this capacity he was given the task of delivering two of the three seats for the Fianna Fáil Party.

=== Election to Dáil Éireann ===
Healy-Rae broke from Fianna Fáil in controversial circumstances prior to the 1997 general election. When the party refused to nominate him as a candidate in Kerry South, he decided to run as an independent candidate. This move surprised the party, with many commentators giving him little chance of getting elected. However, Healy-Rae took a seat and denied Fianna Fáil the chance of taking a second seat in the constituency.

After the election, the Fianna Fáil and Progressive Democrats prospective government was still short of an overall majority. Healy-Rae was one of four independent TDs (the others were Harry Blaney, Tom Gildea and Mildred Fox) who supported the government throughout its five-year term and rejected the opposition Fine Gael. In return for this support he secured funding for projects in his constituency and chairmanship of the Environment committee. His policy approach could be defined as populist, primarily driven by his rural background and constituency, and he frequently demanded upgrades to public services such as schools and roads in his constituency as the price of his support for the government.

Healy-Rae contested the 2002 general election and although his seat looked in doubt at some stages of the campaign and he received only the fourth-highest number of first-preference votes, he was narrowly re-elected, winning the third seat. He sat through fewer than half the meetings of an Oireachtas committee tasked with dealing with social welfare he received €20,000 a year to chair. He got up and left during 25pc of the meetings of the committee leaving the vice-chairman, Charlie O'Connor, to oversee the meetings and absented himself entirely from a further 25pc of meetings, despite a convention that chairmen appointed by the government should fully chair all meetings.

=== External support for Fianna Fáil ===
He was again re-elected to the Dáil at the 2007 general election and signed a confidence and supply deal with Fianna Fáil. Promising to support the government in return for investment in the Kerry South constituency. The details of this deal were not made public. Healy-Rae has been criticised for not making the details of the deal public and for supporting the government over highly controversial cutbacks (in contrast to Finian McGrath who made the details public by entering his deal into the Dáil record and who withdrew his support from the government in 2008, over cutbacks in the health sector). He was confronted publicly by members of the Kerry Public Sector Workers Alliance about his continual support for cutbacks and for the Irish bank bailout. Healy-Rae said he was powerless as he had only one vote and that they "should talk to the Green Party that are making the big changes".

== Retirement ==
On 26 June 2008, Healy-Rae announced that he intended to retire at the next general election. His son Michael Healy-Rae was selected as a candidate by the Healy-Rae organisation on 28 October 2010, and was elected at the 2011 general election.

== Death ==
Healy-Rae died on 5 December 2014, at Kerry General Hospital in Tralee after a long illness.

Dáil	Election	Deputy (Party)	Deputy (Party)	Deputy (Party)
9th	1937	John Flynn (FF)	Frederick Crowley (FF)	Fionán Lynch (FG)
10th	1938	John Flynn (FF)	Frederick Crowley (FF)	Fionán Lynch (FG)
11th	1943	John Healy (FF)	Frederick Crowley (FF)	Fionán Lynch (FG)
12th	1944	John Healy (FF)	Frederick Crowley (FF)	Fionán Lynch (FG)
12th	1944 by-election	John Healy (FF)	Frederick Crowley (FF)	Donal O'Donoghue (FF)
12th	1945 by-election	John Healy (FF)	Honor Crowley (FF)	Donal O'Donoghue (FF)
13th	1948	John Flynn (Ind.)	Honor Crowley (FF)	Patrick Palmer (FG)
14th	1951	John Flynn (Ind.)	Honor Crowley (FF)	Patrick Palmer (FG)
15th	1954	John Flynn (FF)	Honor Crowley (FF)	Patrick Palmer (FG)
16th	1957	John Joe Rice (SF)	Honor Crowley (FF)	Patrick Palmer (FG)
17th	1961	Timothy O'Connor (FF)	Honor Crowley (FF)	Patrick Connor (FG)
18th	1965	Timothy O'Connor (FF)	Honor Crowley (FF)	Patrick Connor (FG)
18th	1966 by-election	Timothy O'Connor (FF)	John O'Leary (FF)	Patrick Connor (FG)
19th	1969	Timothy O'Connor (FF)	John O'Leary (FF)	Michael Begley (FG)
20th	1973	Timothy O'Connor (FF)	John O'Leary (FF)	Michael Begley (FG)
21st	1977	Timothy O'Connor (FF)	John O'Leary (FF)	Michael Begley (FG)
22nd	1981	Michael Moynihan (Lab)	John O'Leary (FF)	Michael Begley (FG)
23rd	1982 (Feb)	Michael Moynihan (Lab)	John O'Leary (FF)	Michael Begley (FG)
24th	1982 (Nov)	Michael Moynihan (Lab)	John O'Leary (FF)	Michael Begley (FG)
25th	1987	John O'Donoghue (Note: O'Donoghue served as Ceann Comhairle in the 30th Dáil from 2007 to 2009.) (FF)	John O'Leary (FF)	Michael Begley (FG)
26th	1989	John O'Donoghue (FF)	John O'Leary (FF)	Michael Moynihan (Lab)
27th	1992	John O'Donoghue (FF)	John O'Leary (FF)	Breeda Moynihan-Cronin (Lab)
28th	1997	John O'Donoghue (FF)	Jackie Healy-Rae (Ind.)	Breeda Moynihan-Cronin (Lab)
29th	2002	John O'Donoghue (FF)	Jackie Healy-Rae (Ind.)	Breeda Moynihan-Cronin (Lab)
30th	2007	John O'Donoghue (FF)	Jackie Healy-Rae (Ind.)	Tom Sheahan (FG)
31st	2011	Tom Fleming (Ind.)	Michael Healy-Rae (Ind.)	Brendan Griffin (FG)
32nd	2016	Constituency abolished. See Kerry		
