= John Brassil =

Irish former politician (born 1963)

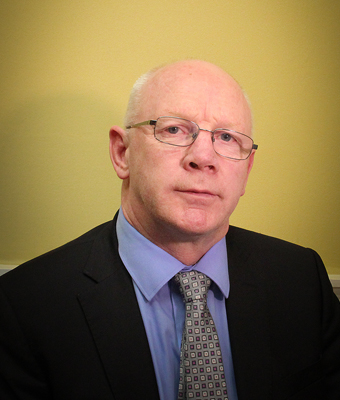
- Brassil in 2016

Teachta Dála
- In office February 2016 – February 2020
- Constituency: Kerry

Personal details
- Born: 19 March 1963 (age 63) Tralee, County Kerry, Ireland
- Party: Fianna Fáil
- Spouse: Bernadette Brassil (m. 1998)
- Children: 3
- Education: Trinity College Dublin

John Brassil (born 19 March 1963) is an Irish former Fianna Fáil politician who served as a Teachta Dála (TD) for the Kerry constituency from 2016 to 2020.

He gained the Fianna Fáil nomination in 2015, ahead of former North Kerry TD Tom McEllistrim, who lost his seat at the 2011 general election. As Norma Moriarty, Fianna Fáil's other candidate in Kerry was based in the south of the constituency, Brassil held the monopoly in a traditionally Fianna Fáil region of North Kerry.

Brassil was appointed by Micheál Martin as the Fianna Fáil junior spokesperson on primary care and community health services. He is a pharmacist by profession. He was a member of Kerry County Council from 1999 to 2016 for the Listowel local electoral area. He lost his seat at the general election in February 2020, to his party colleague Norma Foley.

Dáil	Election	Deputy (Party)	Deputy (Party)	Deputy (Party)	Deputy (Party)	Deputy (Party)	Deputy (Party)	Deputy (Party)
4th	1923	Tom McEllistrim (Rep)	Austin Stack (Rep)	Patrick Cahill (Rep)	Thomas O'Donoghue (Rep)	James Crowley (CnaG)	Fionán Lynch (CnaG)	John O'Sullivan (CnaG)
5th	1927 (Jun)	Tom McEllistrim (FF)	Austin Stack (SF)	William O'Leary (FF)	Thomas O'Reilly (FF)	James Crowley (CnaG)	Fionán Lynch (CnaG)	John O'Sullivan (CnaG)
6th	1927 (Sep)	Tom McEllistrim (FF)	Frederick Crowley (FF)	William O'Leary (FF)	Thomas O'Reilly (FF)	James Crowley (CnaG)	Fionán Lynch (CnaG)	John O'Sullivan (CnaG)
7th	1932	Tom McEllistrim (FF)	Frederick Crowley (FF)	John Flynn (FF)	Thomas O'Reilly (FF)	Eamon Kissane (FF)	Fionán Lynch (CnaG)	John O'Sullivan (CnaG)
8th	1933	Tom McEllistrim (FF)	Frederick Crowley (FF)	John Flynn (FF)	Denis Daly (FF)	Eamon Kissane (FF)	Fionán Lynch (CnaG)	John O'Sullivan (CnaG)
9th	1937	Constituency abolished. See Kerry North and Kerry South						

Dáil	Election	Deputy (Party)	Deputy (Party)	Deputy (Party)	Deputy (Party)	Deputy (Party)
32nd	2016	Martin Ferris (SF)	Michael Healy-Rae (Ind.)	Danny Healy-Rae (Ind.)	John Brassil (FF)	Brendan Griffin (FG)
33rd	2020	Pa Daly (SF)	Michael Healy-Rae (Ind.)	Danny Healy-Rae (Ind.)	Norma Foley (FF)	Brendan Griffin (FG)
34th	2024	Pa Daly (SF)	Michael Healy-Rae (Ind.)	Danny Healy-Rae (Ind.)	Norma Foley (FF)	Michael Cahill (FF)
