= R570 road (Ireland) =

Regional road in County Kerry, Ireland

R570 road
- Bóthar R570

Route information
- Length: 5.9 km (3.7 mi)

Major junctions
- From: N22 at Glenflesk, County Kerry
- Cross River Flesk; Cross Mallow–Tralee rail line
- To: N72 at Barraduff

Location
- Country: Ireland

Highway system
- Roads in Ireland; Motorways; Primary; Secondary; Regional
← R569	→ R571

The R570 road is a regional road in County Kerry, Ireland. It travels from the N22 road at Glenflesk to the N72 at Barraduff, via the village of Headfort. The road is 5.9 kilometres (3.7 mi) long.
