= 2019 Kerry County Council election =

Part of the 2019 Irish local elections

← 2014	24 May 2019	2024 →

All 33 seats on Kerry County Council 17 seats needed for a majority
	First party	Second party	Third party
Party	Fianna Fáil	Fine Gael	Sinn Féin
Seats won	10	7	4
Seat change	▲1	▼2	▼1
	Fourth party	Fifth party	Sixth party
Party	Labour	Kerry Ind. Alliance	Independent
Seats won	2	1	9
Seat change	Steady	Steady	▲2
- Results by local electoral area
Council control before election
Fianna Fáil
Fine Gael
Council control after election
Fianna Fáil
Fine Gael

An election to all 33 seats on Kerry County Council was held on 24 May 2019 as part of the 2019 Irish local elections. County Kerry was divided into 6 local electoral areas (LEAs) to elect councillors for a five-year term of office on the electoral system of proportional representation by means of the single transferable vote (PR-STV).

== Boundary review ==
Following a recommendation of the 2018 Boundary Committee, the boundaries of the LEAs were altered from those used in the 2014 elections. Its terms of reference required no change in the total number of councillors but set a lower maximum LEA size of seven councillors, exceeded by three of the four 2014 LEAs. Other changes reflected population shifts revealed by the 2016 census.

== Results by party ==
Party	Seats	±	1st pref	FPv%	±%
Fianna Fáil	10	▲1	17,943	25.78	▲3.53
Fine Gael	7	▼2	15,225	21.88	▲0.09
Sinn Féin	4	▼1	9,292	13.35	▼0.84
Labour	2	Steady	3,117	4.48	▼2.11
Kerry Ind. Alliance	1	Steady	1,983	2.85	▼0.22
Green	0	Steady	2,151	3.09	New
Aontú	0	Steady	1,100	1.58	New
People Before Profit	0	Steady	174	0.25	▼0.31
Independent	9	▲2	18,594	26.72	▼4.82
Total	33	Steady	69,588	100.00	

== Results by local electoral area ==
*: Outgoing councillor elected in 2014.
†: Outgoing councillor coopted subsequent to the 2014 election.

=== Castleisland ===
Castleisland: 4 seats
Party	Candidate	FPv%	Count			
Party	Candidate	FPv%	1	2	3	4
Independent	Jackie Healy-Rae	28.55%	2,621			
Independent	Charlie Farrelly	18.17%	1,668	1,872		
Fine Gael	Bobby O'Connell	15.89%	1,459	1,562	1,674	2,076
Fianna Fáil	Fionnán Fitzgerald	11.30%	1,037	1,171	1,482	1,753
Sinn Féin	Kate McSweeney	10.60%	973	1,149	1,245	1,364
Fine Gael	Pat McCarthy	8.66%	795	861	926	
Fianna Fáil	Tom McEllistrim	6.84%	628	729		
Electorate: 14,764 Valid: 9,181 Spoilt: 107 Quota: 1,837 Turnout: 9,288 (62.91%)

=== Corca Dhuibhne ===
Corca Dhuibhne: 3 seats
Party	Candidate	FPv%	Count				
Party	Candidate	FPv%	1	2	3	4	5
Fianna Fáil	Michael D. O'Shea	22.43%	1,680	1,774	1,880		
Fianna Fáil	Breandán Fitzgerald	17.09%	1,280	1,423	1,561	2,013	
Fine Gael	Tommy Griffin	16.70%	1,251	1,325	1,400	1,535	1,567
Fine Gael	Séamus Cosaí Fitzgerald	13.43%	1,006	1,121	1,310	1,515	1,623
Sinn Féin	Robert Brosnan	11.12%	833	969	1,147		
Green	Michael Fitzgerald	10.37%	777	829			
Independent	David Russell	8.86%	664				
Electorate: 11,904 Valid: 7,491 Spoilt: 93 Quota: 1,873 Turnout: 7,584 (63.71%)

=== Kenmare ===
Kenmare: 6 seats
Party	Candidate	FPv%	Count							
Party	Candidate	FPv%	1	2	3	4	5	6	7	8
Independent	Johnny Healy-Rae	22.15%	3,023							
Fianna Fáil	Michael Cahill	16.26%	2,219							
Fianna Fáil	Norma Moriarty	14.41%	1,966							
Fianna Fáil	John Francis Flynn	10.08%	1,375	1,537	1,685	1,710	1,714	1,872	1,921	2,001
Fine Gael	Patrick Connor-Scarteen	9.67%	1,320	1,505	1,527	1,634	1,636	1,772	1,942	2,142
Independent	Dan McCarthy	7.69%	1,050	1,465	1,484	1,588	1,592	1,618	1,734	1,955
Sinn Féin	Damian Quigg	5.61%	766	864	901	921	923	992	1,047	1,247
Green	Cleo Murphy	5.06%	691	732	740	845	846	862	892	
Fine Gael	Patrick Lyne	3.25%	444	502	509	513	516	561		
Fine Gael	Donie O'Sullivan	3.14%	428	478	502	516				
Labour	Luke Crowley-Holland	2.67%	364	428	432					
Electorate: 21,813 Valid: 13,646 Spoilt: 142 Quota: 1,950 Turnout: 13,788 (63.21%)

=== Killarney ===
Killarney: 7 seats
Party	Candidate	FPv%	Count						
Party	Candidate	FPv%	1	2	3	4	5	6	7
Independent	Maura Healy-Rae	24.46%	3,099						
Kerry Ind. Alliance	Michael Gleeson (Note: See change below.)	15.65%	1,983						
Independent	Brendan Cronin	11.88%	1,505	1,727					
Independent	Donal Grady	10.45%	1,324	1,529	1,618				
Fianna Fáil	Niall Kelleher	9.81%	1,243	1,603					
Independent	Niall O'Callaghan	8.41%	1,065	1,293	1,387	1,444	1,480	1,694	
Labour	Marie Moloney	6.88%	871	1,037	1,122	1,172	1,204	1,348	1,400
Fine Gael	John Sheahan	6.53%	827	978	1,056	1,133	1,163	1,217	
Sinn Féin	John Buckley	3.83%	485	591	615	661	690		
Fianna Fáil	Neily O'Connor	2.10%	266	343	372				
Electorate: 20,864 Valid: 12,668 Spoilt: 126 Quota: 1,584 Turnout: 12,794 (61.32%)

=== Listowel ===
Listowel: 6 seats
Party	Candidate	FPv%	Count						
Party	Candidate	FPv%	1	2	3	4	5	6	7
Fine Gael	Aoife Thornton	18.95%	2,578						
Fine Gael	Mike Kennelly	15.17%	2,064						
Sinn Féin	Robert Beasley	10.89%	1,482	1,537	1,546	1,566	1,683	2,010	
Sinn Féin	Tom Barry	10.57%	1,438	1,474	1,494	1,535	1,579	1,797	1,829
Fianna Fáil	John Lucid	9.48%	1,289	1,389	1,394	1,406	1,630	1,681	1,685
Fianna Fáil	Jimmy Moloney	9.28%	1,262	1,361	1,388	1,487	1,519	1,714	1,727
Fine Gael	Michael Foley	9.11%	1,239	1,439	1,477	1,551	1,607	1,761	1,778
Independent	Michael O'Gorman	7.51%	1,022	1,084	1,097	1,209	1,333		
Aontú	Sonny Foran	5.75%	782	843	846	870			
Independent	John Martin O'Sullivan	3.22%	438	468	473				
Electorate: 25,077 Valid: 13,603 Spoilt: 220 Quota: 1,944 Turnout: 13,823 (55.12%)

=== Tralee ===
Tralee: 7 seats
Party	Candidate	FPv%	Count											
Party	Candidate	FPv%	1	2	3	4	5	6	7	8	9	10	11	12
Fianna Fáil	Norma Foley	16.20%	2,106											
Sinn Féin	Toiréasa Ferris	11.84%	1,539	1,590	1,600	1,636								
Labour	Terry O'Brien	11.25%	1,462	1,538	1,551	1,568	1,589	1,613	1,748					
Fine Gael	Jim Finucane	9.25%	1,202	1,250	1,251	1,257	1,274	1,297	1,333	1,401	1,423	1,423	1,630	
Fianna Fáil	Mikey Sheehy	9.08%	1,180	1,311	1,313	1,318	1,329	1,366	1,411	1,539	1,545	1,545	1,676	
Sinn Féin	Pa Daly	8.64%	1,123	1,149	1,156	1,167	1,196	1,235	1,278	1,333	1,341	1,344	1,400	1,904
Independent	Sam Locke	6.23%	810	838	851	862	901	1,000	1,035	1,122	1,144	1,144	1,228	1,305
Green	Anne-Marie Fuller	5.25%	683	704	708	753	775	815	868	890	915	920	974	996
Sinn Féin	Cathal Foley	5.02%	653	661	669	674	685	693	704	730	734	737	753	
Fine Gael	Bridget O'Brien	4.71%	612	639	643	647	655	668	687	725	730	730		
Labour	Ben Slimm	3.23%	420	429	432	443	452	460						
Fianna Fáil	Johnnie Wall	3.17%	412	449	455	458	462	473	501					
Aontú	Mary Fitzgibbon	2.45%	318	327	336	338	350							
Independent	Ted Cronin	1.52%	197	203	213	225								
People Before Profit	Bec Fahy	1.34%	174	176	184									
Independent	Yvonne Dineen	0.62%	80	81										
Independent	Denis O'Reilly	0.22%	28	29										
Electorate: 25,036 Valid: 12,999 Spoilt: 170 Quota: 1,625 Turnout: 13,169 (52.6%)

== Results by gender ==
2019 Kerry County Council election Candidates by gender
Gender	Number of candidates	% of candidates	Elected councillors	% of councillors
Men	49	79.0%	27	81.8%
Women	13	21.0%	6	18.2%
TOTAL	62		33	

== Changes after the 2019 election ==
Party	Outgoing	LEA	Reason	Date	Co-optee
Sinn Féin	Toiréasa Ferris	Tralee	Resignation on 2 September 2019	21 October 2019	Cathal Foley
Fianna Fáil	Norma Foley	Tralee	Elected to the 33rd Dáil at the 2020 general election	25 February 2020	Johnnie Wall
Sinn Féin	Pa Daly	Tralee	Elected to the 33rd Dáil at the 2020 general election	25 February 2020	Deirdre Ferris
Kerry Ind. Alliance	Michael Gleeson	Killarney	Resignation	May 2021	John O'Donoghue
Independent	Donal Grady	Killarney	Retirement	May 2023	Martin Grady

== Sources ==
- "Local Elections 2019: Results, Transfer of Votes and Statistics" (PDF). Department of Housing, Planning and Local Government (DHPLG). pp. 119–125. Archived from the original (PDF) on 10 June 2020.
- "Kerry County Council - Local Election candidates". RTÉ News. 13 May 2019. Archived from the original on 6 June 2019.
- "Kerry County Council: 2019 Local Election". IrelandElection.com. Archived from the original on 6 June 2021.
