= Martin Ferris =

Irish former politician (born 1952)

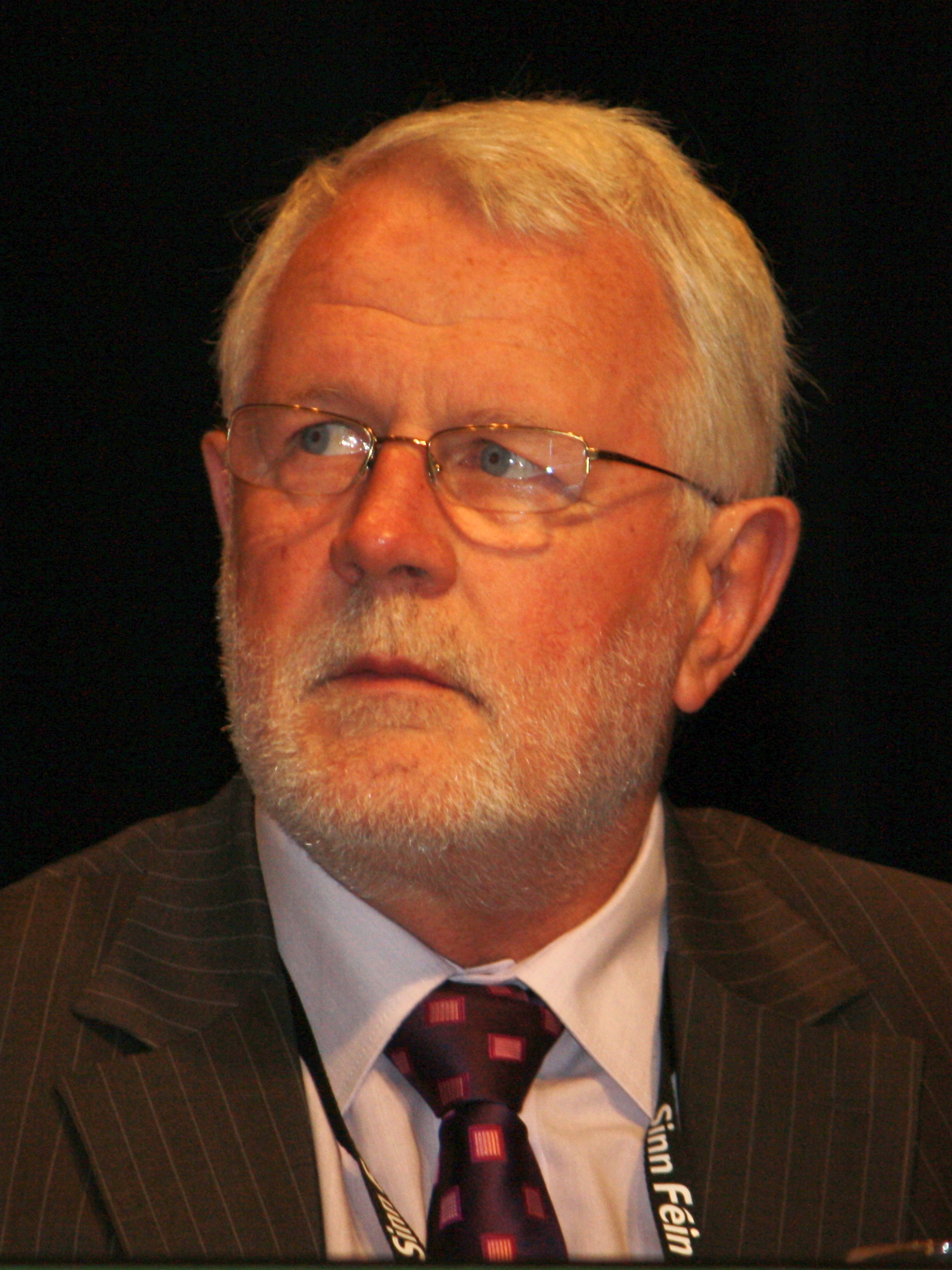
- Ferris in 2011

Teachta Dála
- In office February 2016 – February 2020
- Constituency: Kerry
- In office February 2011 – February 2016
- Constituency: Kerry North–West Limerick
- In office May 2002 – February 2011
- Constituency: Kerry North

Personal details
- Born: 28 March 1952 (age 74) Tralee, County Kerry, Ireland
- Party: Sinn Féin
- Spouse: Máire Hoare (m. 1978)
- Children: 6, including Toiréasa
- Education: St Mary's CBS

Martin Ferris (born 28 March 1952) is an Irish former Sinn Féin politician and former Provisional Irish Republican Army (IRA) volunteer who served as a TD from 2002 to 2020.

== Early and personal life ==
Ferris was born in Strand Street in Tralee, County Kerry, in 1952. His father was a farmer who was also a caretaker for Barrow House, which was at that time owned by an aunt. He was educated locally at Barrow National School, St Mary's CBS, and Tralee Technical School. He left school early, working on his family's farm and as a fisherman. His father died from a stroke in 1970.

Martin met his wife, Máire Hoare, after his release from Portlaoise Prison in 1977. They married in January 1978 and have six children. A daughter, Toiréasa, is a former Cathaoirleach of Kerry County Council and councillor for the Tralee electoral area.

== Gaelic football career ==
Ferris played in the Cotter Cup at the under-14 age group as a back. He played as centre forward for Churchill GAA. He began his inter-county career in 1972 playing Under-21 football for Kerry. He lined out as a forward, beating Cork at the Munster final, although the team was beaten by Galway at the All Ireland Final. Despite being on the run, he was selected in 1973. He won an All-Ireland Under-21 Football Championship medal with Kerry, beating Mayo 2–12 to 0–13. His career was interrupted by his imprisonment later that year. After being released he resumed playing for Churchill and was selected by Mick O'Dwyer to play for the Seniors in 1978. Ferris left the Kerry training panel after the Munster final that year (in which he was unable to play), owing to poor health and Garda Special Branch surveillance.

== Provisional IRA activity ==
Ferris joined the Provisional IRA shortly after the death of his father on 29 May 1970. Aged 18, he was sworn in by Paddy Kelly and Liam Cotter, a former vice-chairman of the Kerry County Board of the GAA.

From September 1974 to February 1975, Ferris was on the run. He was suspected of having taken part in a robbery at the Tralee post office, which resulted in £74,000 being stolen, and a robbery at the Chase Manhattan Bank in Shannon, County Clare in December 1974 which led to the theft of £159,000. He was arrested by Gardaí in Youghal, County Cork, on 14 February 1975, along with two other IRA members, viz., Danny O'Sullivan and Robert McNamara. The Gardaí had been on the alert after a robbery at Central Dairies in Dungarvan, County Waterford. They were later tried by the Special Criminal Court where O'Sullivan was sentenced to six and eight years concurrently. Ferris was not convicted of robbery but was remanded to Portlaoise Prison pending further charges of membership in the IRA as a proscribed organisation. He was sentenced to 12 months in Portlaoise. He was released after nine months in November 1975.

He was arrested again in February 1976 at a Garda roadblock in Ballinrobe, County Mayo after attending the funeral of Frank Stagg. On 16 February, he was charged with IRA membership at the Special Criminal Court in Dublin, and sentenced to 18 months in prison. In March 1977, Ferris took part in a hunger strike along with 20 other prisoners, demanding a public inquiry into conditions in the prison. After 32 days he was transferred to Curragh Military Hospital. The hunger strike ended after 47 days. A guarantee had been given to the prisoners by Bishop James Kavanagh that the government would work to improve prison conditions. Although conditions improved somewhat, Tim Pat Coogan, a nationalist historian and former editor of The Irish Press, noted that after a visit in 1977 tensions still remained, and mentioned reports of visitors being denied visits after long distances and that strip searching was still carried out. Ferris was released two months later in June 1977.

In September 1984, Ferris attempted to import seven tons of explosives, firearms and ammunition, as well as medications, training manuals, and communications equipment, using the fishing vessel Marita Ann, which was piloted by Mike Browne, another IRA member. The plan involved rendezvousing with the trawler Valhalla, captained by Bob Anderson, which sailed from Boston, Massachusetts, transferring arms and ammunition to the Marita Ann and sailing to the south coast of County Kerry, where a number of cars were on standby to deliver the weapons to various Provisional IRA arms dumps. The Marita Ann was intercepted by the Irish Navy vessels the LÉ Emer and the LÉ Aisling off the south coast of Kerry with the weapons and ammunition on board. The crew were arrested. On 11 December 1984, Ferris and two other members of the Marita Ann crew, including Browne and a United States citizen, John Crawley, were sentenced to ten years imprisonment at Portlaoise Prison. Gavin Mortimer and John McCarthy both received suspended sentences. He was released on 11 September 1994.

In February 2005, the Minister for Justice, Equality and Law Reform, Michael McDowell, using parliamentary privilege, named Ferris—as well as Gerry Adams and Martin McGuinness—as a member of the IRA Army Council, an allegation that has been denied by Ferris and the Sinn Féin leadership. In July of that year, the Irish Independent reported that Ferris, along with Adams and McGuinness, had stepped down from the Army Council in the lead-up to an IRA statement on its future.

Ferris has courted controversy by his refusal to condemn the murder of Detective Garda Jerry McCabe during a botched Post Office raid by the Provisional IRA in 1996. Ferris had also greeted Pearse McAuley and Kevin Walsh, the men charged with the manslaughter of Garda McCabe, upon their release from prison as part of the Good Friday Agreement.

== Political career ==
=== Kerry County Council ===
Following his release from prison he began focusing on community activism, particularly against drug dealing in Kerry. He was appointed to the Sinn Féin Árd Chomhairle in 1995. He ran for election to the Dáil at the 1997 general election in the Kerry North constituency, polling 5,691 first-preference votes, but was not elected. At the 1999 local elections he was elected to Kerry County Council and Tralee town council. He was an unsuccessful candidate in Munster in election held on the same day to the European Parliament.

=== Dáil Éireann ===
Ferris was first elected to Dáil Éireann in Kerry North at the 2002 general election, topping the poll and unseating former Labour leader and Tánaiste Dick Spring.

During the election campaign Ferris was arrested but later released. He later claimed that he had been verbally and physically assaulted while in Garda custody. His biographer J.J. Barrett described the Garda surveillance of Ferris as "unhealthy", writing that "it was to backfire seriously". He was re-elected in Kerry North at the 2007 general election, for the redrawn constituency of Kerry North–West Limerick at the 2011 general election, and for the new constituency of Kerry at the 2016.

In the 31st Dáil he was the Sinn Féin spokesperson on Agriculture and Rural Development, and also on the Marine and Natural Resources.

At the 2017 Sinn Féin Ard Fheis, Gerry Adams confirmed neither he nor Ferris would be standing at the 2020 Irish general election.

== Sources ==
- Barrett, J.J.; "Martin Ferris: Man of Kerry", ISBN 0-86322-310-9,

Dáil	Election	Deputy (Party)	Deputy (Party)	Deputy (Party)	Deputy (Party)
9th	1937	Stephen Fuller (FF)	Tom McEllistrim, Snr (FF)	John O'Sullivan (FG)	Eamon Kissane (FF)
10th	1938	Stephen Fuller (FF)	Tom McEllistrim, Snr (FF)	John O'Sullivan (FG)	Eamon Kissane (FF)
11th	1943	Dan Spring (Lab)	Tom McEllistrim, Snr (FF)	Patrick Finucane (CnaT)	Eamon Kissane (FF)
12th	1944	Dan Spring (NLP)	Tom McEllistrim, Snr (FF)	Patrick Finucane (CnaT)	Eamon Kissane (FF)
13th	1948	Dan Spring (NLP)	Tom McEllistrim, Snr (FF)	Patrick Finucane (CnaT)	Eamon Kissane (FF)
14th	1951	Dan Spring (Lab)	Tom McEllistrim, Snr (FF)	Patrick Finucane (Ind.)	John Lynch (FG)
15th	1954	Dan Spring (Lab)	Tom McEllistrim, Snr (FF)	Patrick Finucane (CnaT)	Johnny Connor (CnaP)
15th	1956 by-election	Dan Spring (Lab)	Tom McEllistrim, Snr (FF)	Patrick Finucane (CnaT)	Kathleen O'Connor (CnaP)
16th	1957	Dan Spring (Lab)	Tom McEllistrim, Snr (FF)	Patrick Finucane (Ind.)	Daniel Moloney (FF)
17th	1961	Dan Spring (Lab)	Tom McEllistrim, Snr (FF)	Patrick Finucane (Ind.)	3 seats from 1961
18th	1965	Dan Spring (Lab)	Tom McEllistrim, Snr (FF)	Patrick Finucane (Ind.)	3 seats from 1961
19th	1969	Dan Spring (Lab)	Gerard Lynch (FG)	Tom McEllistrim, Jnr (FF)	3 seats from 1961
20th	1973	Dan Spring (Lab)	Gerard Lynch (FG)	Tom McEllistrim, Jnr (FF)	3 seats from 1961
21st	1977	Dan Spring (Lab)	Kit Ahern (FF)	Tom McEllistrim, Jnr (FF)	3 seats from 1961
22nd	1981	Dick Spring (Lab)	Denis Foley (FF)	Tom McEllistrim, Jnr (FF)	3 seats from 1961
23rd	1982 (Feb)	Dick Spring (Lab)	Denis Foley (FF)	Tom McEllistrim, Jnr (FF)	3 seats from 1961
24th	1982 (Nov)	Dick Spring (Lab)	Denis Foley (FF)	Tom McEllistrim, Jnr (FF)	3 seats from 1961
25th	1987	Dick Spring (Lab)	Denis Foley (FF)	Jimmy Deenihan (FG)	3 seats from 1961
26th	1989	Dick Spring (Lab)	Tom McEllistrim, Jnr (FF)	Jimmy Deenihan (FG)	3 seats from 1961
27th	1992	Dick Spring (Lab)	Denis Foley (FF)	Jimmy Deenihan (FG)	3 seats from 1961
28th	1997	Dick Spring (Lab)	Denis Foley (FF)	Jimmy Deenihan (FG)	3 seats from 1961
29th	2002	Martin Ferris (SF)	Tom McEllistrim (FF)	Jimmy Deenihan (FG)	3 seats from 1961
30th	2007	Martin Ferris (SF)	Tom McEllistrim (FF)	Jimmy Deenihan (FG)	3 seats from 1961
31st	2011	Constituency abolished. See Kerry North–West Limerick			

Dáil	Election	Deputy (Party)	Deputy (Party)	Deputy (Party)
31st	2011	Arthur Spring (Lab)	Martin Ferris (SF)	Jimmy Deenihan (FG)
32nd	2016	Constituency abolished. See Kerry and Limerick County		

Dáil	Election	Deputy (Party)	Deputy (Party)	Deputy (Party)	Deputy (Party)	Deputy (Party)	Deputy (Party)	Deputy (Party)
4th	1923	Tom McEllistrim (Rep)	Austin Stack (Rep)	Patrick Cahill (Rep)	Thomas O'Donoghue (Rep)	James Crowley (CnaG)	Fionán Lynch (CnaG)	John O'Sullivan (CnaG)
5th	1927 (Jun)	Tom McEllistrim (FF)	Austin Stack (SF)	William O'Leary (FF)	Thomas O'Reilly (FF)	James Crowley (CnaG)	Fionán Lynch (CnaG)	John O'Sullivan (CnaG)
6th	1927 (Sep)	Tom McEllistrim (FF)	Frederick Crowley (FF)	William O'Leary (FF)	Thomas O'Reilly (FF)	James Crowley (CnaG)	Fionán Lynch (CnaG)	John O'Sullivan (CnaG)
7th	1932	Tom McEllistrim (FF)	Frederick Crowley (FF)	John Flynn (FF)	Thomas O'Reilly (FF)	Eamon Kissane (FF)	Fionán Lynch (CnaG)	John O'Sullivan (CnaG)
8th	1933	Tom McEllistrim (FF)	Frederick Crowley (FF)	John Flynn (FF)	Denis Daly (FF)	Eamon Kissane (FF)	Fionán Lynch (CnaG)	John O'Sullivan (CnaG)
9th	1937	Constituency abolished. See Kerry North and Kerry South						

Dáil	Election	Deputy (Party)	Deputy (Party)	Deputy (Party)	Deputy (Party)	Deputy (Party)
32nd	2016	Martin Ferris (SF)	Michael Healy-Rae (Ind.)	Danny Healy-Rae (Ind.)	John Brassil (FF)	Brendan Griffin (FG)
33rd	2020	Pa Daly (SF)	Michael Healy-Rae (Ind.)	Danny Healy-Rae (Ind.)	Norma Foley (FF)	Brendan Griffin (FG)
34th	2024	Pa Daly (SF)	Michael Healy-Rae (Ind.)	Danny Healy-Rae (Ind.)	Norma Foley (FF)	Michael Cahill (FF)
