= Danny Healy-Rae =

Irish politician (born 1954)

Danny Healy-Rae TD
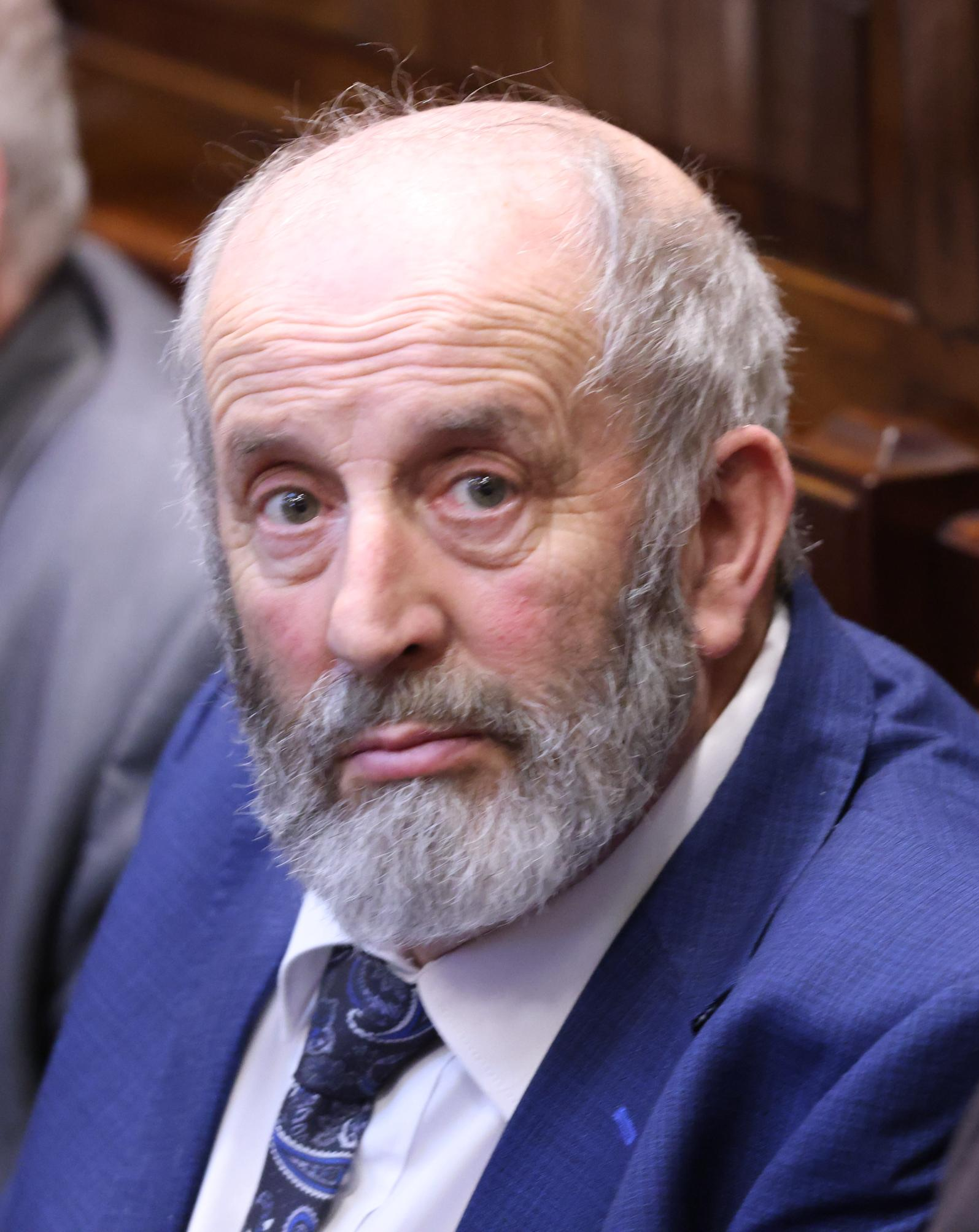
- Healy-Rae in 2025

Teachta Dála
- Incumbent
- Assumed office February 2016
- Constituency: Kerry

Personal details
- Born: 16 July 1954 (age 72) Kilgarvan, County Kerry, Ireland
- Party: Independent
- Spouse: Mary Burke (m. 1985)
- Children: 4
- Parent: Jackie Healy-Rae (father)
- Relatives: Michael Healy-Rae (brother)

Daniel Healy-Rae (born 16 July 1954) is an Irish independent politician who has been a Teachta Dála (TD) for the Kerry constituency since the 2016 general election. Prior to entering national politics, he was a member of Kerry County Council from 2003 to 2016 for the Killarney local electoral area.

A member of the Healy-Rae family, he is a son of Jackie Healy-Rae and brother of fellow constituency TD Michael Healy-Rae. His daughter, Maura and son, Johnny are both elected members of Kerry County Council for the Killarney and Kenmare local electoral areas respectively. He has worked in plant hire and owns a pub in Kilgarvan.

== Political career ==
Healy-Rae was co-opted on to Kerry County Council in 2003 representing the Killarney Local electoral area. He replaced his father, Jackie Healy-Rae, who was forced to resign his seat following the end of the dual mandate. He was re-elected to the council in the 2004, 2009 and 2014 Local Elections.

Healy-Rae was first elected to Dáil Éireann in the 2016 general election in the newly-formed constituency of Kerry. His daughter Maura was co-opted into his council seat.

At the 2020 general election, his share of the first-preference votes fell from 12.6% to 11.2%, and he was re-elected on the sixth count.

He was re-elected to the Dáil in the 2024 general election and along with his brother, Michael, negotiated with Fianna Fáil and Fine Gael on a programme for government. The two brothers supported Micheál Martin's election as Taoiseach and Michael Healy-Rae secured a Minister of State position in the Department of Agriculture.

Following the formation of the 35th government Danny Healy-Rae sought to avail of opposition speaking time as a member of the Regional Independent Group however this was ruled out of order by the Ceann Comhairle, Verona Murphy after a protracted row.

== Political views ==
Danny Healy-Rae has garnered a reputation for being one of Irish politics' outspoken figures, and has courted controversy on a number of occasions.

=== Drink driving permits ===
In November 2019, Healy-Rae gained attention for proposing 'drink-drive permits’ for people in rural Ireland. He proposed that this would help ease rural isolation and keep pubs open, allowing drivers to have two or three pints of beer before being allowed to drive home on designated roads.

Healy-Rae, himself a pub owner, also accused the Irish government of inflicting "damage and mayhem" on rural Ireland with existent drink-driving laws.

His comments in the Dáil were met with derision and disapproval by fellow politicians and road safety groups alike.

=== Climate crisis ===
Healy-Rae has publicly denied climate change on multiple occasions, stating that he "does not subscribe to climate change" and that "whatever we do on this Earth will not change the weather."

He began to promote climate change denial during 2016, when he stated during an interview with Hot Press magazine that his views about the climate crisis were based on the words of the Bible, claiming that the story of Noah's Ark showed that weather events had fluctuated throughout the centuries. Healy-Rae also stated in the Dáil that "God above is in charge of the weather and we here can't do anything about it" during a debate on the subject.

His climate denial escalated in 2017 when he promoted falsehoods about the climate crisis being a money-making scheme and claiming that the measures put in place following the Paris Agreement were unfair. His comments wrongly conflated climate change with weather.

In February 2020 he issued a public apology having previously stated "to hell with the planet" during an interview with Virgin Media News when asked about his responsibility to protect the environment as well as his constituents. He had said "Vote for the people, stay with the people, and to hell with the planet and the fellas that says we must save the planet and forget about the people – I'm not one of those people, I make no apologies to anyone anywhere for that and I stay with the people as long as the people want me"

=== COVID-19 ===
In May 2020, he called for the Leaving Certificate to go ahead with proper social distancing due to COVID-19, possibly using community centres and public libraries.

In July 2021, Healy-Rae courted controversy when his pub was at the centre of an alleged breach of COVID-19 regulations after video and images were shared on social media showing a large crowd gathered inside the pub as part of a wedding celebration.

The footage showed a large gathering of people celebrating without wearing face masks (although these were not legally required), with Danny Healy-Rae pulling a pint at the bar during a time when the Irish government had implemented controls on the number of people able to gather indoors due to the spread of the COVID-19 virus.

Healy-Rae refused to comment on the Garda investigation into the incident, as did his brother, Michael, who was also present at the party.

Healy-Rae and his brother, fellow Kerry TD Michael Healy-Rae, have been trenchant critics of the government's COVID-19 policies, particularly for the hospitality and tourism sectors.

=== Same-sex adoption and abortion ===
Healy-Rae opposes abortion and was a prominent commentator against changing legislation during the 2018 Irish abortion referendum. During the referendum he was widely criticised for employing a number of shock tactics that were determined to be insensitive and for 'shock factor’.

He has also repeatedly affirmed that he is against same-sex marriage and same-sex adoption, calling it unnatural for a gay couple to adopt a child.

On the latter he commented, "What was I very worried about – and still am – is that two men, or two women, could adopt a little baby girl or a little baby boy and these babies would have no say in it."

=== Autism ===
In September 2025, during a debate on special education places, he said "I am wondering what it is, and I have asked this question here before in different debates. Is there something causing it? Is it lack of some vitamins or what is it? We need to address that part of it as well because there could be something that is causing it."

He was criticised by Shónagh Ní Raghallaigh, Sinn Féin spokesperson on special education, who said "I was genuinely shocked at his remarks that I deem to be extremely disparaging and completely unfounded," she said. Spouting conspiratorial beliefs on the floor of the Dáil on such a sensitive topic is unacceptable." Sinn Féin called on him to withdraw his statement and apologise to families who were sitting in the Dáil gallery at the time. Ní Raghallaigh wrote to the Ceann Comhairle asking that she facilitate the request by the party.

AsIAm, a charity that supports and advocates for autistic people, criticised his comments as unhelpful and misinformed. In a statement they said "We would ask all Oireachtas members to think about the impact of their words before they use their platform to add to the pervasive stigma, myths and hurtful stereotypes that not only cause hurt but create barriers to diagnosis and support and pose broader public health concerns." They also pointed out that autism is a natural variation in human nervous systems and that there are not more autistic people, but more people seeking diagnoses.

Dáil	Election	Deputy (Party)	Deputy (Party)	Deputy (Party)	Deputy (Party)	Deputy (Party)	Deputy (Party)	Deputy (Party)
4th	1923	Tom McEllistrim (Rep)	Austin Stack (Rep)	Patrick Cahill (Rep)	Thomas O'Donoghue (Rep)	James Crowley (CnaG)	Fionán Lynch (CnaG)	John O'Sullivan (CnaG)
5th	1927 (Jun)	Tom McEllistrim (FF)	Austin Stack (SF)	William O'Leary (FF)	Thomas O'Reilly (FF)	James Crowley (CnaG)	Fionán Lynch (CnaG)	John O'Sullivan (CnaG)
6th	1927 (Sep)	Tom McEllistrim (FF)	Frederick Crowley (FF)	William O'Leary (FF)	Thomas O'Reilly (FF)	James Crowley (CnaG)	Fionán Lynch (CnaG)	John O'Sullivan (CnaG)
7th	1932	Tom McEllistrim (FF)	Frederick Crowley (FF)	John Flynn (FF)	Thomas O'Reilly (FF)	Eamon Kissane (FF)	Fionán Lynch (CnaG)	John O'Sullivan (CnaG)
8th	1933	Tom McEllistrim (FF)	Frederick Crowley (FF)	John Flynn (FF)	Denis Daly (FF)	Eamon Kissane (FF)	Fionán Lynch (CnaG)	John O'Sullivan (CnaG)
9th	1937	Constituency abolished. See Kerry North and Kerry South						

Dáil	Election	Deputy (Party)	Deputy (Party)	Deputy (Party)	Deputy (Party)	Deputy (Party)
32nd	2016	Martin Ferris (SF)	Michael Healy-Rae (Ind.)	Danny Healy-Rae (Ind.)	John Brassil (FF)	Brendan Griffin (FG)
33rd	2020	Pa Daly (SF)	Michael Healy-Rae (Ind.)	Danny Healy-Rae (Ind.)	Norma Foley (FF)	Brendan Griffin (FG)
34th	2024	Pa Daly (SF)	Michael Healy-Rae (Ind.)	Danny Healy-Rae (Ind.)	Norma Foley (FF)	Michael Cahill (FF)
