= Noel Grealish =

Irish politician (born 1965)

Noel Grealish TD
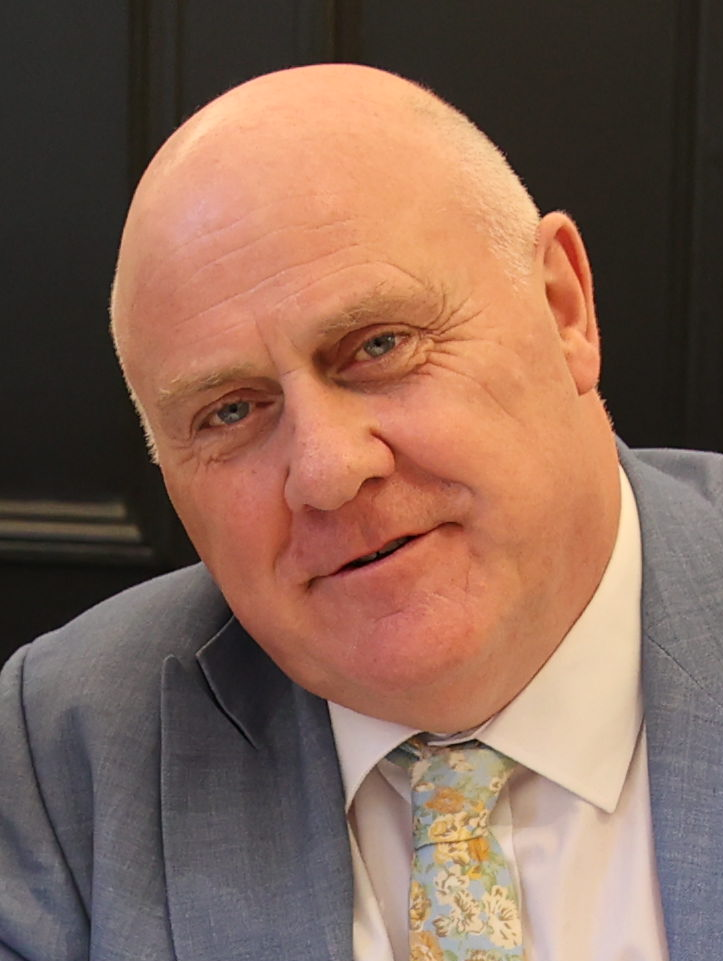
- Grealish in 2024

Minister of State
- 2025–: Agriculture, Food, Fisheries and the Marine

Teachta Dála
- Incumbent
- Assumed office May 2002
- Constituency: Galway West

Personal details
- Born: 16 December 1965 (age 60) Carnmore, County Galway, Ireland
- Party: Independent (since 2009)
- Other political affiliations: Progressive Democrats (1999–2009)
- Education: NUI Maynooth
- Website: noelgrealishtd.com

Noel Grealish (born 16 December 1965) is an Irish independent politician who has been a Teachta Dála (TD) for the Galway West constituency since the 2002 general election. He has served as a Minister of State since January 2025.

== Political career ==
He is from Carnmore, near Galway. He was formerly a Progressive Democrats TD.

Grealish first contested an election in 1999, when he was elected to Galway County Council to represent the Oranmore local electoral area, with 1,357 first preferences. He was first elected to Dáil Éireann at the 2002 general election, with 2,735 first preferences, succeeding long-serving TD Bobby Molloy.

He was re-elected at the 2007 general election, with 5,806 first preferences. As one of only two Progressive Democrat TDs elected in 2007, he was appointed as Chairman of the Progressive Democrats Parliamentary Party in June 2007. He was Deputy Leader of the Progressive Democrats from 25 May 2007 to 24 March 2009, succeeding Liz O'Donnell in the position. Towards the end of 2007, Grealish stated that he had discussions with a senior Fianna Fáil politician about the possibility of him joining Fianna Fáil, but made the decision to stay with the Progressive Democrats.

He assumed the leadership of the Progressive Democrats on 24 March 2009, following the decision of then-leader Ciarán Cannon to stand aside and join Fine Gael. Grealish served as interim and final leader of the party until 20 November 2009, at which point the party disbanded.

He sits as an independent TD in Dáil Éireann, and was re-elected as an independent deputy at the 2011, 2016, 2020, and 2024 general elections. He supported the Fianna Fáil-Green Party government in parliamentary votes from 2007 until 24 September 2010, when he announced that he was withdrawing his support for the government due to health cuts.

=== Anti-immigrant rhetoric ===
In September 2019, Grealish faced criticism and calls to resign after he made comments about asylum seekers, described by some commentators as racist, which described all African asylum seekers as "spongers." The Taoiseach Leo Varadkar, after being told during an interview what Grealish had said, remarked "If that's what he said, he should withdraw those remarks and make a statement on it and clarify them". Fellow Independent TD Michael Collins defended Grealish in a radio interview, in which he claimed Ireland was "losing its culture" because of immigrants and suggested that Ireland should "look after our own people first and then when that issue is sorted, let's start looking at people from across the world". For this, both he and Grealish were criticised in Irish political circles, with Labour leader Brendan Howlin calling the pair "highly dangerous", while Irish President Michael D. Higgins, while not directly referencing them, publicly rejected their rhetoric, suggesting it was not factual that Immigrants were replacing people in Ireland, and that Immigrants accounted for a high percentage of Ireland's GDP.

On 12 November 2019 claimed - without any evidence - migrants to Ireland were sending vast sums of money out of the country, and singled out Nigerian residents in Ireland, claiming they were sending €3.5 billion in funds back to relatives in Nigeria. Grealish suggested this amount could have been generated by crime. Ruth Coppinger called Grealish's remarks "Disgraceful racism". Responding to his question, Taoiseach Leo Varadkar called on Grealish to present "any evidence" that the funds were generated by crime, while also citing the long history of Irish emigrants sending money back to Ireland.

The Central Statistics Office of Ireland debunked Grealish's reading of the statistics on 13 November 2019, correcting him by stating the amount being sent back was only €17 million. Furthermore, Finance Minister Paschal Donohoe called on Grealish to clarify why he focused specifically on Nigerians and to justify his presentation of his figures. Housing Minister Eoghan Murphy said he did not like what Grealish was insinuating and referred to his rhetoric as "disgusting and potentially dangerous".

=== Oireachtas Golf Society scandal ===
In August 2020, Grealish was one of the figures of the Oireachtas Golf Society scandal, when members of the Oireachtas Golf Society were accused of breaching the rules set down by the Irish government about gathering during the COVID-19 pandemic. Grealish served as Captain of Oireachtas Golf Society and the event took place under his leadership, with the invitation to the event bearing his personal signature and the signature of President of the Society Donie Cassidy. Following the details of the event becoming known to the public, Galway City Mayor Mike Cubbard and Galway County Council Chairperson James Charity called on Grealish to resign as a TD.

In February 2021 the Director of Public Prosecutions announced Grealish would be prosecuted for his role in Golfgate. In May Grealish was issued a summons for a court date of 22 July. The case was adjourned until 28 October. On 3 February 2022, Grealish, Cassidy, and their co-defendants were acquitted of all charges. The Court concluded: “They were all responsible people who would not have gone to a dinner unless they felt comfortable and unless the organisers had not put in place all that was required to make it safe." Grealish said he was "delighted with the outcome".

=== 2022 to present ===
After the 2024 general election, he was a member of the Regional Independent Group. On 23 January 2025, he was appointed as a Minister of State at the Department of Agriculture, Food, Fisheries and the Marine with responsibility for food promotion, new markets, research and development. He is also a super junior minister, one of four Ministers of State in attendance at cabinet, but without a vote.

In August 2026, Grealish attended a gathering of the Alliance for Responsible Citizenship (The ARC) in London. The gathering was described as an "anti-woke Davos" and "united in a rejection of a general leftist or liberal leftist view of the world". The Department of Agriculture, Food and the Marine confirmed that he had attended the event in a personal capacity and not as Minister of State.

Political offices
New office	Minister of State at the Department of Agriculture, Food, Fisheries and the Marine; 2025–present	Incumbent
Party political offices
Preceded by Ciarán Cannon	Leader of the Progressive Democrats (Interim); 2009	Party disbanded in 2009

Dáil	Election	Deputy (Party)	Deputy (Party)	Deputy (Party)	Deputy (Party)	Deputy (Party)
9th	1937	Gerald Bartley (FF)	Joseph Mongan (FG)	Seán Tubridy (FF)	3 seats 1937–1977	
10th	1938	Gerald Bartley (FF)	Joseph Mongan (FG)	Seán Tubridy (FF)	3 seats 1937–1977	
10th	1940 by-election	Gerald Bartley (FF)	Joseph Mongan (FG)	John J. Keane (FF)	3 seats 1937–1977	
11th	1943	Gerald Bartley (FF)	Joseph Mongan (FG)	Eamon Corbett (FF)	3 seats 1937–1977	
12th	1944	Gerald Bartley (FF)	Joseph Mongan (FG)	Michael Lydon (FF)	3 seats 1937–1977	
13th	1948	Gerald Bartley (FF)	Joseph Mongan (FG)	Michael Lydon (FF)	3 seats 1937–1977	
14th	1951	Gerald Bartley (FF)	John Mannion Snr (FG)	Peadar Duignan (FF)	3 seats 1937–1977	
15th	1954	Gerald Bartley (FF)	Fintan Coogan Snr (FG)	Johnny Geoghegan (FF)	3 seats 1937–1977	
16th	1957	Gerald Bartley (FF)	Fintan Coogan Snr (FG)	Johnny Geoghegan (FF)	3 seats 1937–1977	
17th	1961	Gerald Bartley (FF)	Fintan Coogan Snr (FG)	Johnny Geoghegan (FF)	3 seats 1937–1977	
18th	1965	Bobby Molloy (FF)	Fintan Coogan Snr (FG)	Johnny Geoghegan (FF)	3 seats 1937–1977	
19th	1969	Bobby Molloy (FF)	Fintan Coogan Snr (FG)	Johnny Geoghegan (FF)	3 seats 1937–1977	
20th	1973	Bobby Molloy (FF)	Fintan Coogan Snr (FG)	Johnny Geoghegan (FF)	3 seats 1937–1977	
20th	1975 by-election	Bobby Molloy (FF)	Fintan Coogan Snr (FG)	Máire Geoghegan-Quinn (FF)	3 seats 1937–1977	
21st	1977	Bobby Molloy (FF)	John Mannion Jnr (FG)	Máire Geoghegan-Quinn (FF)	Bill Loughnane (FF)	4 seats 1977–1981
22nd	1981	Bobby Molloy (FF)	John Donnellan (FG)	Máire Geoghegan-Quinn (FF)	Mark Killilea Jnr (FF)	Michael D. Higgins (Lab)
23rd	1982 (Feb)	Bobby Molloy (FF)	John Donnellan (FG)	Máire Geoghegan-Quinn (FF)	Frank Fahey (FF)	Michael D. Higgins (Lab)
24th	1982 (Nov)	Bobby Molloy (FF)	John Donnellan (FG)	Máire Geoghegan-Quinn (FF)	Frank Fahey (FF)	Fintan Coogan Jnr (FG)
25th	1987	Bobby Molloy (PDs)	John Donnellan (FG)	Máire Geoghegan-Quinn (FF)	Frank Fahey (FF)	Michael D. Higgins (Lab)
26th	1989	Bobby Molloy (PDs)	Pádraic McCormack (FG)	Máire Geoghegan-Quinn (FF)	Frank Fahey (FF)	Michael D. Higgins (Lab)
27th	1992	Bobby Molloy (PDs)	Pádraic McCormack (FG)	Máire Geoghegan-Quinn (FF)	Éamon Ó Cuív (FF)	Michael D. Higgins (Lab)
28th	1997	Bobby Molloy (PDs)	Pádraic McCormack (FG)	Frank Fahey (FF)	Éamon Ó Cuív (FF)	Michael D. Higgins (Lab)
29th	2002	Noel Grealish (PDs)	Pádraic McCormack (FG)	Frank Fahey (FF)	Éamon Ó Cuív (FF)	Michael D. Higgins (Lab)
30th	2007	Noel Grealish (PDs)	Pádraic McCormack (FG)	Frank Fahey (FF)	Éamon Ó Cuív (FF)	Michael D. Higgins (Lab)
31st	2011	Noel Grealish (Ind.)	Brian Walsh (FG)	Seán Kyne (FG)	Éamon Ó Cuív (FF)	Derek Nolan (Lab)
32nd	2016	Noel Grealish (Ind.)	Hildegarde Naughton (FG)	Seán Kyne (FG)	Éamon Ó Cuív (FF)	Catherine Connolly (Ind.)
33rd	2020	Noel Grealish (Ind.)	Hildegarde Naughton (FG)	Mairéad Farrell (SF)	Éamon Ó Cuív (FF)	Catherine Connolly (Ind.)
34th	2024	Noel Grealish (Ind.)	Hildegarde Naughton (FG)	Mairéad Farrell (SF)	John Connolly (FF)	Catherine Connolly (Ind.)
34th	2026 by-election	Noel Grealish (Ind.)	Hildegarde Naughton (FG)	Mairéad Farrell (SF)	John Connolly (FF)	Seán Kyne (FG)
