= 1999 Kerry County Council election =

Part of the 1999 Irish local elections

← 1991	10 June 1999	2004 →

All 27 seats to Kerry County Council
	First party	Second party	Third party
Party	Fianna Fáil	Fine Gael	Labour
Seats won	12	6	3
Seat change	▼1	▼1	▼1
	Fourth party	Fifth party	Sixth party
Party	Sinn Féin	SKIA	Independent
Seats won	1	1	4
Seat change	▲1	▲1	▲1
- Area of Kerry County Council

An election to Kerry County Council took place on 10 June 1999 as part of that year's Irish local elections. 27 councillors were elected from five local electoral areas on the system of proportional representation by means of the single transferable vote (PR-STV) for a five-year term of office.

== Results by party ==
Party	Seats	±	First Pref. votes	FPv%	±%
Fianna Fáil	12	▼1	25,331	39.80	▼4.34
Fine Gael	6	▼1	14,951	23.49	▼2.74
Labour	3	▼1	9,119	14.33	▼2.23
Sinn Féin	1	▲1	3,810	5.99	▲4.81
SKIA	1	▲1	1,478	2.32	New
Green	0	Steady	246	0.39	▼1.35
Independent	4	▲1	8,713	13.69	▲4.21
Totals	27	Steady	63,648	100.00	

== Results by local electoral area ==
=== Dingle ===
Dingle - 3 seats
Party	Candidate	FPv%	Count					
Party	Candidate	FPv%	1	2	3	4	5	6
Fianna Fáil	Breandan MacGearailt*	27.50	1,969					
Fianna Fáil	Michael O'Shea*	23.98	1,717	1,736	1,759	1,850		
Fine Gael	Seamus (Cosai) Fitzgerald	14.76	1,057	1,148	1,196	1,307	1,472	1,658
Fianna Fáil	Colette Flynn-Scanlon	10.92	782	819	851	874	972	1,319
Independent	Brigid O'Connor	8.12	581	589	636	676	836	
Labour	Tom Flynn	7.47	535	543	571	609		
Fine Gael	Mick O'Connell	4.05	290	296	326			
Independent	John Paul O'Brien	3.18	228	296	326			
Electorate: 10,879 Valid: 7,159 (65.81%) Spoilt: 89 Quota: 1,790 Turnout: 7,248 (66.62%)

=== Killarney ===
Killarney - 6 seats
Party	Candidate	FPv%	Count							
Party	Candidate	FPv%	1	2	3	4	5	6	7	8
Independent	Jackie Healy-Rae TD*	23.03	3,302							
Fianna Fáil	Tom Fleming*	14.42	2,068							
Labour	Breeda Moynihan-Cronin TD*	11.45	1,642	1,866	1,900	1,903	2,153			
Fianna Fáil	Brian O'Leary*	10.70	1,534	1,774	1,796	1,802	1,849	1,883	2,257	
SKIA	Michael Gleeson	10.31	1,478	1,682	1,709	1,710	1,768	1,850	2,044	2,113
Independent	Brendan Cronin	9.11	1,306	1,457	1,496	1,499	1,537	1,679	1,801	1,862
Fine Gael	Senator Paul Coghlan*	7.45	1,068	1,154	1,199	1,200	1,219	1,477	1,545	1,566
Fianna Fáil	Tom Doherty	5.31	762	921	942	945	969	1,005		
Fine Gael	Mark O'Shea	3.79	544	595	629	630	641			
Labour	Andrew McCarthy	3.11	446	493	498	499				
Independent	Tom Randles	1.32	189	280						
Electorate: 21,843 Valid: 14,339 (65.65%) Spoilt: 233 Quota: 2,049 Turnout: 14,572 (66.71%)

=== Killorglin ===
Killorglin - 5 seats
Party	Candidate	FPv%	Count								
Party	Candidate	FPv%	1	2	3	4	5	6	7	8	9
Fianna Fáil	Paul O'Donoghue*	18.29	2,162								
Fianna Fáil	Michael Cahill*	15.75	1,862	1,897	1,941	2,150					
Fine Gael	Michael Connor-Scarteen*	11.91	1,408	1,411	1,413	1,420	1,501	1,503	1,595	2,113	
Fine Gael	Johnny (Porridge) O'Connor	11.44	1,352	1,356	1,394	1,485	1,525	1,575	1,686	1,722	1,731
Fine Gael	P.J. Donovan	9.52	1,125	1,184	1,188	1,191	1,448	1,448	1,838	1,856	1,871
Independent	Michael Healy-Rae	8.64	1,022	1,042	1,064	1,117	1,179	1,213	1,425	1,703	1,821
Fianna Fáil	Dan McCarthy	8.01	947	966	968	982	986	1,054	1,099		
Labour	Seán O hArgáin	7.33	867	891	909	920	988	991			
Fine Gael	Donal Barry	4.38	518	532	536	540					
Fianna Fáil	Paudie O'Connor	3.29	389	401	423						
Independent	Patrick O'Reilly	1.44	170	171							
Electorate: 17,885 Valid: 11,822 (66.10%) Spoilt: 233 Quota: 1,971 Turnout: 12,021 (67.21%)

=== Listowel ===
Listowel - 6 seats
Party	Candidate	FPv%	Count						
Party	Candidate	FPv%	1	2	3	4	5	6	7
Fine Gael	Jimmy Deenihan TD	17.11	2,321						
Fianna Fáil	Senator Dan Kiely*	14.89	2,020						
Fianna Fáil	Ned O'Sullivan*	11.00	1,492	1,561	1,599	1,735	1,766	1,841	1,934
Fine Gael	Tim Buckley*	10.12	1,372	1,496	1,532	1,594	1,617	1,714	1,755
Labour	Pat Leahy*	9.67	1,312	1,365	1,441	1,467	1,618	1,746	1,846
Fine Gael	Bernie Behan*	9.66	1,310	1,361	1,369	1,375	1,430	1,444	1,546
Fianna Fáil	John Brassil	9.57	1,298	1,314	1,324	1,357	1,469	1,484	1,754
Sinn Féin	Risteard O Fuarain	5.27	715	723	730	738	816	1,070	
Sinn Féin	Anthony Curtin	4.70	637	654	673	700	712		
Labour	Liam O'Sullivan	3.67	498	513	521	530			
Fianna Fáil	Michael Walsh	2.51	341	359	372				
Independent	Margaret Carmody	1.83	248	260					
Electorate: 23,406 Valid: 13,546 (57.95%) Spoilt: 262 Quota: 1,938 Turnout: 13,826 (59.07%)

=== Tralee ===
Tralee - 7 seats
Party	Candidate	FPv%	Count									
Party	Candidate	FPv%	1	2	3	4	5	6	7	8	9	10
Labour	Maeve Spring*	18.56	3,174									
Sinn Féin	Martin Ferris	14.37	2,458									
Fianna Fáil	Tom McEllistrim	9.58	1,638	1,712	1,736	1,760	1,897	1,995	2,135	2,432		
Fine Gael	Bobby O'Connell*	9.07	1,551	1,607	1,618	1,633	1,656	1,671	1,695	1,969	2,006	2,077
Fianna Fáil	Denis Foley TD*	8.44	1,443	1,528	1,569	1,587	1,685	1,801	1,968	2,178		
Fine Gael	Pat McCarthy	6.05	1,035	1,107	1,121	1,149	1,204	1,240	1,283	1,327	1,339	1,486
Fianna Fáil	Ted Fitzgerald*	6.02	1,030	1,106	1,131	1,146	1,204	1,288	1,453	1,502	1,562	1,879
Independent	Billy Leen	5.66	968	1,026	1,094	1,124	1,170	1,284	1,360	1,416	1,430	1,595
Fianna Fáil	Michael Walsh	5.59	956	983	990	998	1,024	1,047	1,131			
Fianna Fáil	Johnnie Wall	4.15	710	829	860	876	919	1,012				
Independent	Tommy Foley*	4.09	699	789	832	861	891					
Labour	John Commane*	3.77	645	952	973	1,010	1,028	1,115	1,212	1,240	1,247	
Fianna Fáil	Paudie Fuller	3.23	552	583	605	617						
Green	Eddie McCarthy	1.44	246	286	298							
Electorate: 29,913 Valid: 17,105 (57.18%) Spoilt: 306 Quota: 2,139 Turnout: 17,411 (58.21%)
