= 2009 Kerry County Council election =

Part of the 2009 Irish local elections

← 2004	5 June 2009	2014 →

27 seats on Kerry County Council
	First party	Second party	Third party
Party	Fine Gael	Fianna Fáil	Labour
Seats won	10	7	4
Seat change	▲2	▼4	▲2
	Fourth party	Fifth party	Sixth party
Party	Sinn Féin	SKIA	Independent
Seats won	2	1	3
Seat change	Steady	Steady	Steady
- Area of Kerry County Council

An election to Kerry County Council took place on 5 June 2009 as part of that year's Irish local elections. 27 councillors were elected from five local electoral areas (LEAs) for a five-year term of office on the electoral system of proportional representation by means of the single transferable vote (PR-STV).

== Results by party ==
Party	Seats	±	First Pref. votes	FPv%	±%
Fine Gael	10	▲2	21,062	27.37	▲2.55
Fianna Fáil	7	▼4	20,723	26.93	▼10.54
Labour	4	▲2	11,532	14.98	▲3.48
Sinn Féin	2	Steady	8,010	10.41	▲2.55
SKIA	1	Steady	2,536	3.30	▲1.11
Green	0	Steady	881	1.14	▲0.13
Independent	3	Steady	12,215	15.87	▲1.34
Totals	27	Steady	76,959	100.00	Steady

== Results by local electoral area ==
=== Dingle ===
Dingle - 3 seats
Party	Candidate	FPv%	Count			
Party	Candidate	FPv%	1	2	3	4
Fianna Fáil	Michael O'Shea*	21.64	2,011	2,054	2,142	2,517
Fine Gael	Brendan Griffin	21.93	2,038	2,114	2,228	2,317
Fine Gael	Seamus (Cosai) Fitzgerald*	17.00	1,580	1,659	1,964	2,442
Independent	Brigid O'Connor	12.69	1,179	1,315	1,494	1,620
Fianna Fáil	Breandan Fitzgerald	11.33	1,053	1,113	1,251	
Labour	Pat Hanafin	8.75	813	942		
Sinn Féin	Theresa Rafter Moriarty	2.72	253			
Green	Darach O Murchu	2.32	216			
Independent	Breanainn Breglaoi	1.60	149			
Electorate: 13,200 Valid: 9,292 (70.39%) Spoilt: 81 Quota: 2,324 Turnout: 9,373 (71.01%)

=== Killarney ===
Killarney - 7 seats
Party	Candidate	FPv%	Count						
Party	Candidate	FPv%	1	2	3	4	5	6	7
Independent	Danny Healy-Rae*	15.70	2,958						
Fianna Fáil	Tom Fleming*	14.51	2,733						
SKIA	Michael Gleeson*	13.46	2,536						
Independent	Brendan Cronin*	12.37	2,331	2,436					
Labour	Marie Moloney	11.80	2,223	2,318	2,370				
Fine Gael	John Sheahan*	8.77	1,652	1,743	1,778	1,828	1,908	1,920	2,204
Fine Gael	Bobby O'Connell*	8.43	1,588	1,637	1,722	1,735	1,859	1,871	1,973
Independent	Donal Grady	5.71	1,075	1,159	1,178	1,222	1,347	1,364	
Fianna Fáil	Brian O'Leary	5.58	1,052	1,173	1,318	1,362	1,432	1,455	1,730
Sinn Féin	Lynn Boylan	1.71	323	354	364	381			
Sinn Féin	Con Walsh	1.56	293	315	345	348			
Green	Conor O'Neill	0.39	74	79	81	91			
Electorate: 29,916 Valid: 18,838 (62.97%) Spoilt: 195 Quota: 2,355 Turnout: 19,033 (63.62%)

=== Killorglin ===
Killorglin - 5 seats
Party	Candidate	FPv%	Count				
Party	Candidate	FPv%	1	2	3	4	5
Independent	Michael Healy-Rae*	21.28	3,198				
Fianna Fáil	Michael Cahill*	16.27	2,446	2,538			
Fine Gael	P.J. Donovan	15.18	2,282	2,375	2,464	2,473	2,540
Fine Gael	Patrick Connor-Scarteen	13.61	2,045	2,261	2,473	3,118	
Fianna Fáil	Paul O'Donoghue*	13.23	1,988	2,055	2,090	2,251	2,352
Fine Gael	Johnny (Porridge) O'Connor*	10.15	1,525	1,584	1,721	1,754	1,819
Fianna Fáil	Donald Lynch	5.78	869	986	1,059		
Labour	John Sheehan	2.42	364	385			
Green	Oonagh Comerford	2.08	313	340			
Electorate: 21,590 Valid: 15,030 (69.62%) Spoilt: 147 Quota: 2,506 Turnout: 15,177 (70.30%)

=== Listowel ===
Listowel - 5 seats
Party	Candidate	FPv%	Count				
Party	Candidate	FPv%	1	2	3	4	5
Sinn Féin	Robert Beasley*	15.42	2,523	2,601	3,004		
Fine Gael	Liam Purtill*	15.34	2,511	2,598	2,660	2,669	2,790
Fine Gael	Tim Buckley*	14.56	2,383	2,536	2,575	2,604	2,808
Fianna Fáil	John Brassil*	12.44	2,036	2,170	2,322	2,369	2,655
Labour	Pat Leahy*	15.54	1,889	2,033	2,080	2,110	2,694
Fianna Fáil	Dan Kiely*	10.23	1,674	1,898	1,920	1,928	2,048
Labour	Michael Conway	8.57	1,403	1,427	1,606	1,701	
Sinn Féin	Risteard O Fuarain	6.14	1,005	1,017			
Fianna Fáil	Maria Gorman	5.75	941				
Electorate: 25,042 Valid: 16,365 (65.35%) Spoilt: 230 Quota: 2,728 Turnout: 16,595 (66.27%)

=== Tralee ===
Tralee - 7 seats
Party	Candidate	FPv%	Count											
Party	Candidate	FPv%	1	2	3	4	5	6	7	8	9	10	11	12
Labour	Arthur Spring	18.10	3,155											
Sinn Féin	Toireasa Ferris*	17.23	3,004											
Fianna Fáil	Anne McEllistrim*	10.44	1,820	1,892	1,980	2,010	2,022	2,076	2,127	2,233				
Fine Gael	Pat McCarthy*	10.43	1,819	1,900	1,945	1,982	1,985	2,037	2,080	2,230				
Labour	Terry O'Brien*	9.67	1,685	2,105	2,237									
Fine Gael	Jim Finucane	9.40	1,639	1,769	1,825	1,863	1,867	1,923	2,008	2,103	2,110	2,252		
Fianna Fáil	Norma Foley*	6.05	1,055	1,099	1,149	1,178	1,184	1,215	1,242	1,271	1,286	1,379	1,398	1,414
Fianna Fáil	Ted Fitzgerald*	5.99	1,045	1,097	1,140	1,158	1,161	1,194	1,234	1,277	1,293	1,348	1,382	1,400
Sinn Féin	Moss Hannon	3.49	609	636	910	925	939	968	1,018	1,073	1,080			
Independent	Timmy Griffin	2.88	502	541	575	601	606	674	794					
Independent	Thomas Collins	2.39	416	451	496	531	537	603						
Independent	John Foley	2.33	407	439	474	490	494							
Green	David Grey	1.59	278	321	343									
Electorate: 29,305 Valid: 19,249 (59.49%) Spoilt: 335 Quota: 2,180 Turnout: 19,584 (60.36%)
