= 2024 Kerry County Council election =

Part of the 2024 Irish local elections

- 7 June 2024

All 33 seats on Kerry County Council 17 seats needed for a majority
	First party	Second party	Third party
Party	Fianna Fáil	Fine Gael	Sinn Féin
Seats won	9	6	4
Seat change	▼1	▼1	Steady
	Fourth party	Fifth party	Sixth party
Party	Labour	Kerry Ind. Alliance	Independent
Seats won	2	1	11
Seat change	Steady	Steady	▲2
- Area of Kerry County Council
Council control before election
Fianna Fáil
Fine Gael
Council control after election
Fianna Fáil
Fine Gael
Labour

An election to all 33 seats on Kerry County Council was held on 7 June 2024, as part of the 2024 Irish local elections. County Kerry is divided into 6 local electoral areas (LEAs) to elect councillors for a five-year term of office on the electoral system of proportional representation by means of the single transferable vote (PR-STV).

On 20 June, one day before the first sitting, Labour agreed to join Fianna Fáil and Fine Gael in a power-sharing agreement, which will end in 2029.

On 21 June, the newly-elected council met for the first time, with Breandán Fitzgerald of Fianna Fáil being appointed Cathaoirleach.

== Results by party ==
Party	Candidates	Seats	±	First Pref. votes	FPv%	±%
Fianna Fáil	11	9	▼1	16,057	21.43	▼4.35
Fine Gael	10	6	▼1	12,427	16.59	▼5.29
Sinn Féin	13	4	Steady	10,882	14.53	▲1.18
Labour	4	2	Steady	3,291	4.39	▼0.09
Kerry Ind. Alliance	1	1	Steady	1,574	2.10	▼0.75
Green	6	0	Steady	2,767	3.69	▲0.60
Aontú	3	0	Steady	1,177	1.57	▼0.01
Social Democrats	2	0	New	861	1.15	New
The Irish People	3	0	New	558	0.74	New
National Party	1	0	New	393	0.52	New
Party for Animal Welfare	1	0	New	110	0.15	New
Independent	22	11	▲2	24,816	33.13	▲6.41
Totals	77	33	Steady	74,913	100.00	

== Results by local electoral area ==
*: Outgoing councillor elected in 2019.
†: Outgoing councillor coopted subsequent to the 2019 election.

=== Castleisland ===
Castleisland: 4 seats
Party	Candidate	FPv%	Count				
Party	Candidate	FPv%	1	2	3	4	5
Independent	Jackie Healy-Rae	29.86%	2,890				
Independent	Charlie Farrelly	18.63%	1,803	2,117			
Fianna Fáil	Fionnán Fitzgerald	15.92%	1,541	1,741	1,794	1,847	2,104
Fine Gael	Bobby O'Connell	15.15%	1,466	1,628	1,682	1,721	1,910
Independent	Michelle Keane	10.24%	991	1,106	1,138	1,196	1,382
Sinn Féin	Deirdre Bell	7.51%	727	851	882	965	
Green	Paul Bowler	1.41%	136	146	147		
Aontú	Cáit Ní Ríordáin	1.29%	125	154	164		
Electorate: 15,460 Valid: 9,679 Spoilt: 67 Quota: 1,936 Turnout: 9,746 (63.04%)

=== Corca Dhuibhne ===
Corca Dhuibhne: 3 seats
Party	Candidate	FPv%	Count				
Party	Candidate	FPv%	1	2	3	4	5
Fine Gael	Tommy Griffin	22.68%	1,807	1,844	2,041		
Sinn Féin	Robert Brosnan	17.94%	1,429	1,563	1,677	2,131	
Fianna Fáil	Michael O’Shea	16.80%	1,338	1,373	1,435	1,562	1,596
Green	Peadar Ó Fionnáin	12.85%	1,024	1,143	1,242		
Fianna Fáil	Breandán Fitzgerald	12.73%	1,014	1,110	1,372	1,735	1,866
Fine Gael	Séamus Cosaí Fitzgerald	9.29%	740	774			
Labour	Mike Kennedy	6.38%	508				
Electorate: 12,578 Valid: 7,860 Spoilt: 106 Quota: 1,966 Turnout: 7,966 (66.3%)

=== Kenmare ===
Kenmare: 6 seats
Party	Candidate	FPv%	Count												
Party	Candidate	FPv%	1	2	3	4	5	6	7	8	9	10	11	12	13
Independent	Johnny Healy-Rae	23.04%	3,441												
Fianna Fáil	Michael Cahill	14.48%	2,162												
Fianna Fáil	Norma Moriarty	12.09%	1,805	1,986	1,990	1,999	2,018	2,024	2,168						
Independent	Podge Foley	7.73%	1,154	1,257	1,270	1,290	1,335	1,343	1,367	1,369	1,495	1,513	1,567	1,845	1,928
Fine Gael	Teddy O'Sullivan Casey	7.73%	1,154	1,384	1,388	1,427	1,435	1,435	1,439	1,440	1,479	1,486	1,649	1,757	2,017
Independent	Dan McCarthy	5.55%	829	1,183	1,193	1,255	1,298	1,299	1,376	1,381	1,402	1,431	1,543	1,648	1,832
Fianna Fáil	Ken O'Sullivan	5.49%	820	932	932	935	950	955	961	961	976	979	1,001		
Fine Gael	Tony Donnelly	5.16%	770	825	829	832	844	846	918	934	949	1,051	1,099	1,143	
Sinn Féin	Damian Quigg	4.01%	599	677	680	683	709	712	732	733	780	1,021	1,105	1,269	1,352
Green	Cleo Murphy	3.09%	462	482	482	485	491	491	494	494	598	625			
Social Democrats	Tim Clifford	2.91%	434	453	453	455	474	475	479	479					
Sinn Féin	Stephanie O'Shea	2.89%	431	470	476	477	495	496	529	538	569				
Independent	Patrick Lyne	2.49%	372	418	431	438	459	460							
Aontú	Catherina O'Sullivan	1.39%	207	244	278	301									
Independent	Oliver O'Neill	1.06%	158	182	215										
The Irish People	William O'Brien	0.91%	136	145											
Electorate: 23,922 Valid: 14,934 Spoilt: 109 Quota: 2,134 Turnout: 15,043 (62.88%)

=== Killarney ===
Killarney: 7 seats
Party	Candidate	FPv%	Count										
Party	Candidate	FPv%	1	2	3	4	5	6	7	8	9	10	11
Independent	Maura Healy-Rae	23.71%	3,385										
Independent	Martin Grady	14.38%	2,053										
Kerry Ind. Alliance	John O'Donoghue	11.02%	1,574	1,812									
Independent	Brendan Cronin	9.97%	1,423	1,699	1,741	1,746	1,756	1,784	1,787				
Fianna Fáil	Niall Kelleher	9.15%	1,307	1,640	1,674	1,681	1,683	1,685	1,748	1,780	1,804		
Independent	Niall O'Callaghan	8.10%	1,156	1,384	1,445	1,451	1,459	1,494	1,499	1,500	1,528	1,544	1,599
Labour	Marie Moloney	7.31%	1,044	1,252	1,298	1,302	1,306	1,311	1,323	1,334	1,383	1,418	1,575
Fine Gael	Dermot Healy	4.57%	653	750	767	769	771	773	788	797	803	822	881
Sinn Féin	Damien Switzer	2.37%	339	409	430	431	434	440	443	446	609	621	667
Green	Diarmaid Griffin	2.30%	329	359	368	369	371	374	394	402	417	432	
Independent	Iqbal Mahmud	2.13%	304	316	325	325	327	327	335	369	369		
Sinn Féin	Caroline Kenneally	1.74%	248	308	323	324	326	327	332	335			
Independent	Kamaruzzaman Abdul-Kadir	1.29%	184	198	201	201	201	203	210				
Independent	Natalia Krasnenkova	1.02%	146	156	157	157	157	157					
The Irish People	Alan O'Connor	0.71%	101	112	117	117	125						
Independent	William Leen	0.14%	20	28	32	32							
Independent	Diarmuid McGuckin	0.08%	12	17	18	18							
Electorate: 23,159 Valid: 14,278 Spoilt: 132 Quota: 1,785 Turnout: 14,410 (62.22%)

=== Listowel ===
Listowel: 6 seats
Party	Candidate	FPv%	Count								
Party	Candidate	FPv%	1	2	3	4	5	6	7	8	9
Fine Gael	Mike Kennelly	15.70%	2,301								
Independent	Liam "Speedy" Nolan	15.16%	2,223								
Fine Gael	Michael Foley	13.93%	2,042	2,131							
Fianna Fáil	Michael Leane	12.05%	1,766	1,777	1,788	1,812	1,818	1,865	1,884	2,213	
Sinn Féin	Tom Barry	11.49%	1,685	1,714	1,746	1,770	1,775	1,843	1,933	2,030	2,051
Fianna Fáil	Jimmy Moloney	9.35%	1,371	1,416	1,446	1,484	1,500	1,524	1,645	1,725	1,784
Sinn Féin	Marion Falvey O’Sullivan	8.81%	1,292	1,302	1,315	1,372	1,373	1,503	1,528	1,643	1,681
Aontú	Sonny Foran	5.76%	845	853	864	898	901	1,026	1,084		
Sinn Féin	Thomas Harrington	3.04%	446	448	453	455	455				
Independent	John O'Sullivan	2.82%	414	420	440	481	486	500			
Green	Oonagh Comerford	1.13%	165	168	170						
Party for Animal Welfare	Rosemarie Smith	0.75%	110	113	117						
Electorate: 25,821 Valid: 14,660 Spoilt: 137 Quota: 2,095 Turnout: 14,797 (57.31%)

=== Tralee ===
Tralee: 7 seats
Party	Candidate	FPv%	Count													
Party	Candidate	FPv%	1	2	3	4	5	6	7	8	9	10	11	12	13	14
Fianna Fáil	Mikey Sheehy	15.66%	2,114													
Sinn Féin	Deirdre Ferris	11.55%	1,560	1,592	1,612	1,627	1,723									
Labour	Terry O'Brien	11.38%	1,537	1,637	1,721											
Independent	Sam Locke	7.83%	1,057	1,088	1,097	1,119	1,160	1,193	1,323	1,325	1,428	1,549	1,555	1,725		
Sinn Féin	Paul Daly	7.75%	1,046	1,081	1,073	1,089	1,155	1,213	1,258	1,268	1,316	1,436	1,441	1,935		
Fianna Fáil	Anne O'Sullivan	6.07%	819	922	934	937	945	968	978	978	1,059	1,162	1,170	1,220	1,224	1,251
Fine Gael	Angie Baily	5.97%	806	841	860	866	874	904	923	924	1,201	1,413	1,419	1,480	1,518	1,527
Independent	Tom McEllistrim	5.73%	774	804	810	831	844	878	986	988	1,059	1,083	1,088	1,150	1,225	1,245
Sinn Féin	Cathal Foley	5.29%	714	730	735	738	814	850	880	898	971	1,051	1,054			
Fine Gael	Sinéad Donnelly	5.10%	688	713	722	725	743	782	793	794						
Green	Anluan Dunne	4.82%	651	665	680	687	702	824	837	838	899					
Social Democrats	Mistura Oyebamji	3.16%	427	432	456	456	471									
National Party	Jacob Sweeney	2.91%	393	398	401	576	582	590								
Sinn Féin	Paddy Kevane	2.71%	366	370	377	386										
The Irish People	Eddie O'Grady	2.38%	321	323	324											
Labour	Ben Slimm	1.50%	202	211												
Independent	Ame Abdurahman	0.20%	27	27												
Electorate: 26,411 Valid: 13,502 Spoilt: 160 Quota: 1,688 Turnout: 13,662 (51.73%)

== Campaign ==
=== Debates ===
2024 Kerry County Council election debates
Date	Broadcaster	Moderator(s)	Participants — Name Participant N Party not invited/did not participate							Notes
Date	Broadcaster	Moderator(s)	FG	FF	SF	Lab	IND	GP	Aon	Notes
23 Apr	Radio Kerry	Jerry O'Sullivan	Tommy Griffin	Breandán Fitzgerald	Robert Brosnan	Mike Kennedy	N	Peadar Ó Fionnáin	N	
29 Apr	Radio Kerry	Jerry O'Sullivan	Michael Foley	Jimmy Moloney	Thomas Harrington	N	Liam "Speedy" Nolan	N	Sonny Foran	
7 May	Radio Kerry	Jerry O'Sullivan	Teddy O’Sullivan Casey	Norma Moriarty	Stephanie O’Shea	N	Podge Foley + Johnny Healy-Rae	N	N	

== Councillors not standing for re-election ==
Councillor	Electoral area	First elected	Party	Date announced
Jim Finucane (Note: Incumbent Cathaoirleach at time of election.)	Tralee	2009	Fine Gael	12 September 2023
Patrick O'Connor-Scarteen	Kenmare	2009	Fine Gael	3 October 2023
Aoife Thornton	Listowel	2014	Fine Gael	2 February 2024
John Francis Flynn	Killorglin	2014	Fianna Fáil	14 March 2024
