= 1991 Kerry County Council election =

Part of the 1991 Irish local elections

- 27 June 1991

All 27 seats on Kerry County Council
	First party	Second party	Third party
Party	Fianna Fáil	Fine Gael	Labour
Seats won	13	7	4
Seat change	Steady	Steady	▲1
	Fourth party
Party	Independent
Seats won	3
Seat change	▼1
- Area of Kerry County Council

An election to Kerry County Council took place on 27 June 1991 as part of that year's Irish local elections. 27 councillors were elected from five local electoral areas (LEAs) for a five-year term of office on the electoral system of proportional representation by means of the single transferable vote (PR-STV). This term was extended twice, first to 1998, then to 1999.

== Results by party ==
Party	Seats	±	First Pref. votes	FPv%	±%
Fianna Fáil	13	Steady	26,766	44.14	▼2.58
Fine Gael	7	Steady	15,905	26.23	▲2.25
Labour	4	▲1	10,045	16.56	▲5.51
Green	0	Steady	1,057	1.74	New
Sinn Féin	0	Steady	715	1.18	▼4.08
Progressive Democrats	0	Steady	404	0.67	New
Independent	3	▼1	5,752	9.48	▼1.07
Totals	27	Steady	60,644	100.00	Steady

== Results by local electoral area ==
=== Killarney ===
Killarney - 6 seats
Party	Candidate	FPv%	Count						
Party	Candidate	FPv%	1	2	3	4	5	6	7
Fianna Fáil	Tom Fleming*	15.9%	2,291						
Fianna Fáil	John O'Leary TD*	15.4%	2,222						
Fianna Fáil	Jackie Healy-Rae*	13.0%	1,906	1,992	2,065				
Independent	P.J. Cronin*	11.3%	1,629	1,671	1,687	1,790	1,894	2,011	2,151
Labour	Breeda Moynihan-Cronin	8.2%	1,274	1,293	1,304	1,416	1,513	1,621	1,859
Labour	Michael Gleeson*	8.7%	1,254	1,263	1,270	1,345	1,415	1,501	1,684
Fine Gael	Paul Coghlan	7.4%	1,067	1,074	1,083	1,132	1,213	1,465	1,935
Fine Gael	Tim Gleeson	6.5%	944	962	966	988	1,032	1,296	
Fine Gael	Seán Kelly	5.5%	799	816	821	865	913		
Fianna Fáil	Dermot O'Callaghan	3.7%	541	566	594	650			
Green	Eugene O'Shea	3.6%	518	522	527				
Electorate: 20,677 Valid: 14,445 (69.86%) Spoilt: 120 Quota: 2,064 Turnout: 14,565 (70.44%)

=== Killorglin ===
Killorglin - 6 seats
Party	Candidate	FPv%	Count					
Party	Candidate	FPv%	1	2	3	4	5	6
Fianna Fáil	John O'Donoghue TD*	24.8%	2,979					
Fianna Fáil	Michael Cahill*	18.1%	2,170					
Fine Gael	Michael Connor-Scarteen*	13.5%	1,626	1,675	1,681	1,827		
Fine Gael	Danny Kissane*	11.1%	1,328	1,372	1,451	1,529	1,536	1,581
Fine Gael	Dan Barry*	10.3%	1,238	1,658	1,671	1,706	1,724	
Labour	Michael Moynihan TD	9.2%	986	1,087	1,141	1,215	1,244	1,376
Fianna Fáil	Jackie Cahill	5.6%	671	958	1,016	1,054	1,106	
Fianna Fáil	Pat Finnegan	5.1%	616	942	1,170	1,210	1,214	1,710
Progressive Democrats	Marie O'Sullivan	3.4%	404	439	454			
Electorate: 18,062 Valid: 12,018 (66.54%) Spoilt: 127 Quota: 1,717 Turnout: 12,145 (67.24%)

=== Listowel ===
Listowel - 6 seats
Party	Candidate	FPv%	Count						
Party	Candidate	FPv%	1	2	3	4	5	6	7
Fine Gael	Jimmy Deenihan TD*	18.8%	2,725						
Fianna Fáil	Ned O'Sullivan	12.0%	1,743	1,848	1,928	1,982	2,017	2,041	2,057
Fine Gael	Tim Buckley	11.8%	1,713	1,918	1,965	1,984	2,666		
Fianna Fáil	Noel Brassil*	11.7%	1,696	1,710	1,716	2,069	2,344		
Fianna Fáil	Senator Dan Kiely*	11.3%	1,593	1,647	1,677	1,732	1,788	1,832	1,883
Fianna Fáil	Kieran Walsh*	9.3%	1,357	1,415	1,451	1,482	1,520	1,567	1,583
Fine Gael	Bernie Behan	8.1%	1,170	1,248	1,260	1,381			
Labour	Liam O'Sullivan	7.9%	1,150	1,181	1,195				
Labour	Pat Leahy	7.5%	1,090	1,154	1,218	1,695	1,780	1,918	1,932
Independent	James Halpin	1.9%	282	323					
Electorate: 21,584 Valid: 14,519 (67.27%) Spoilt: 147 Quota: 2,075 Turnout: 14,666 (67.95%)

=== Mid-Kerry ===
Mid-Kerry - 5 seats
Party	Candidate	FPv%	Count					
Party	Candidate	FPv%	1	2	3	4	5	6
Fianna Fáil	Breandan MacGearailt*	20.5%	2,170					
Independent	James Courtney*	16.5%	1,746	1,835				
Fianna Fáil	Tom McEllistrim*	15.9%	1,683	1,778				
Fine Gael	Bobby O'Connell	13.3%	1,413	1,417	1,417	1,417	1,658	1,881
Labour	Maeve Spring	12.6%	1,331	1,364	1,385	1,385	1,499	1,629
Fine Gael	Michael Begley*	10.7%	1,130	1,251	1,271	1,272	1,299	1,326
Independent	Arthur Lenihan	5.4%	574	582	588	588		
Fianna Fáil	Sheila Kenny	5.3%	557	609	624	633	762	
Electorate: 15,832 Valid: 10,604 (67.02%) Spoilt: 114 Quota: 1,768 Turnout: 10,718 (67.74%)

=== Tralee ===
Tralee - 4 seats
Party	Candidate	FPv%	Count						
Party	Candidate	FPv%	1	2	3	4	5	6	7
Labour	Dick Spring TD*	32.7%	2,960						
Fianna Fáil	Senator Denis Foley*	20.4%	1,845						
Fine Gael	Jim Kelly	8.3%	752	929	976	1,107	1,169	1,171	1,465
Fianna Fáil	Ted Fitzgerald*	8.0%	726	884	945	1,080	1,166	1,188	1,478
Sinn Féin	Billy Leen	7.9%	715	802	857	917			
Independent	Tommy Foley	7.0%	633	820	913	1,032	1,299	1,303	1,507
Independent	John Blennerhassett*	6.2%	558	793	872	1,026	1,140	1,145	
Green	Conor Fitzgerald	6.0%	539	694	772				
Independent	Michael Donovan	3.6%	330	479					
Electorate: 16,826 Valid: 9,058 (53.83%) Spoilt: 70 Quota: 1,812 Turnout: 9,128 (54.25%)
