= Kerry County Museum =

- Príomh-Mhúsaem Chiarraí

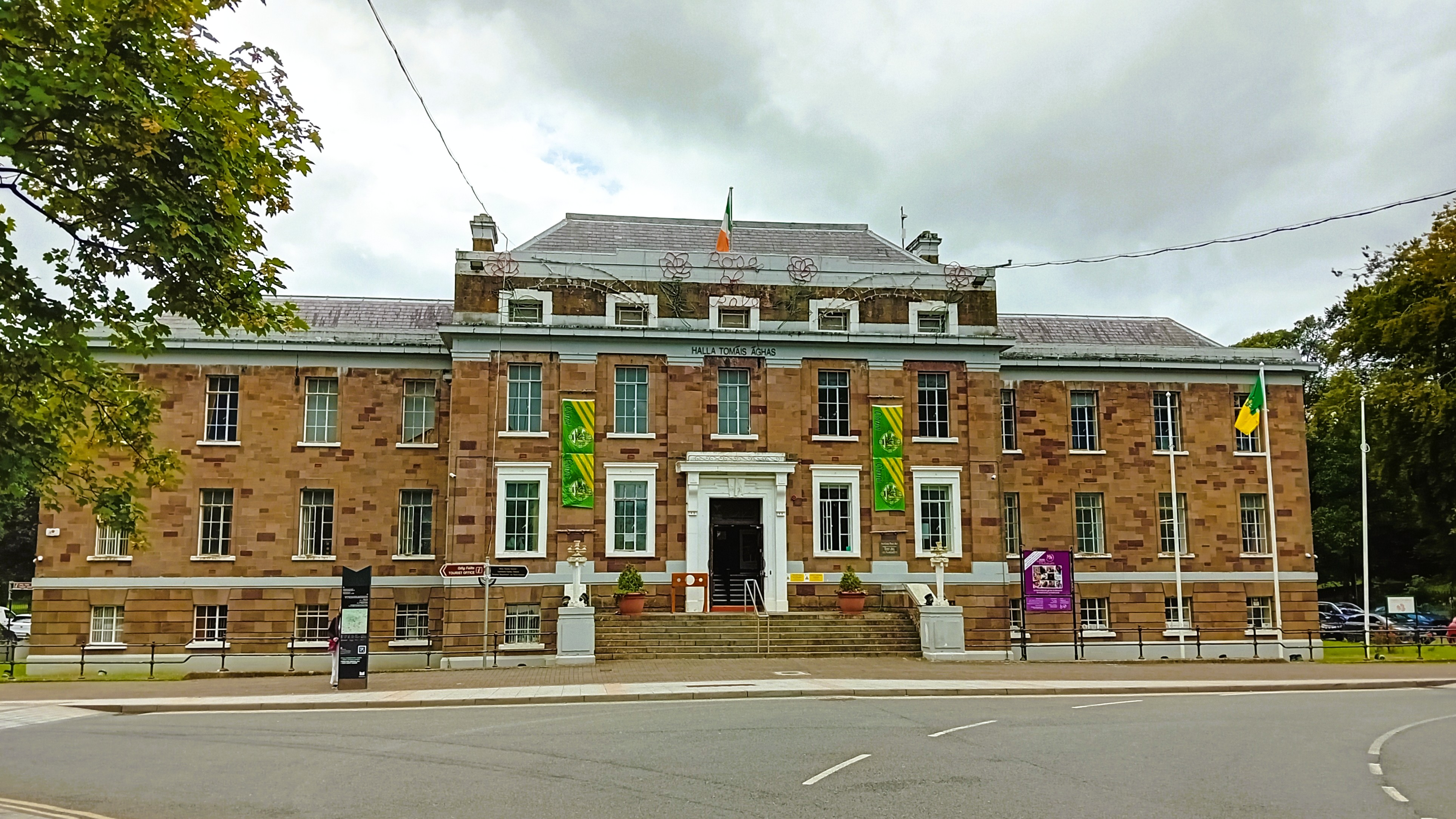

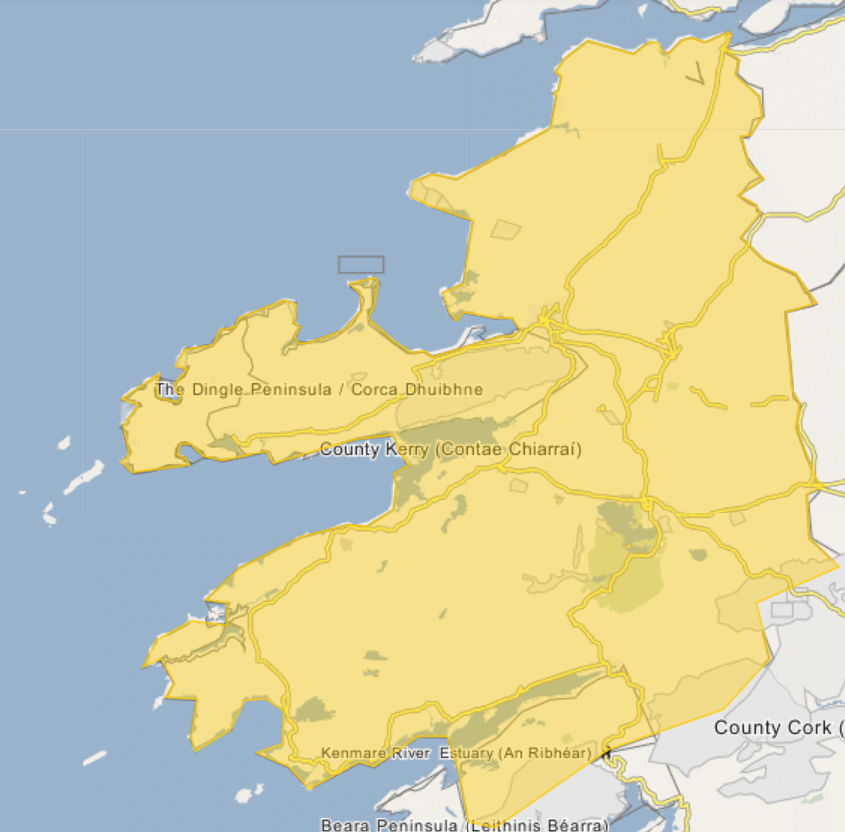
- Location within County Kerry
- Established: 1992; 34 years ago
- Location: Tralee, County Kerry, Ireland
- Coordinates: 52.2669°N 9.7059°W
- Type: County museum
- Public transit access: Tralee railway station
- Website: kerrymuseum.ie

Kerry County Museum (Irish: Príomh-Mhúsaem Chiarraí) is a museum located in Tralee, County Kerry, Ireland. The museum is based in the Ashe Memorial Hall on Denny Street in the centre of Tralee, which had been completed in 1928 as the headquarters of both Kerry County Council and Tralee Urban District Council. After the two councils vacated the building in the 1980s, it was converted to become the County Museum, opening in 1992. The aim of the museum is to collect, record, preserve and display the material heritage of County Kerry.

== History ==
Before World War I, Kerry County Council and Tralee Urban District were both based in a purpose-built building called County Hall on Godfrey Place, which had been completed in 1910. That building was set on fire by the Black and Tans during the Siege of Tralee of November 1920. In the mid-1920s, the two councils decided not to return to County Hall (which was instead subsequently repaired to become an entertainment venue) but instead they agreed to new commission a new municipal building. The site they selected had formed part of the estate of Henry Clements-Finnerty which incorporated the ruins of a 17th century castle built for the Denny family.

A new building was designed by Thomas Joseph Cullen in the Neo-Georgian style, built in ashlar stone at a cost of £32,480, and was opened in 1928. The design involved a symmetrical main frontage of 13 bays facing onto Denny Street. The central section of five bays, which was slightly projected forward, featured a doorway with a rectangular fanlight flanked by a moulded surround and brackets supporting an entablature. The building was fenestrated by pivot windows with painted window sills on two floors. The central section featured an attic level with small rectangular windows. There was a parapet and a hipped roof above. Two months after the building was opened it was named the Ashe Memorial Hall, being dedicated to the memory of the republican Thomas Ashe (1885–1917), who was from County Kerry.

The building served both as the headquarters of Kerry County Council and Tralee Urban District Council, in which capacities different parts of the building were referred to as the Urban Council Chambers and the County Council Chambers. The building also incorporated a theatre, which from the 1930s to 1950s was used as a cinema.

After the county council moved to County Hall, and the urban district council moved to purpose-built offices in Prince's Street, the building fell empty in January 1989. Kerry County Museum was established in the early 1990s as an initiative of the urban district council to exhibit the material heritage of County Kerry. In the early years the museum focused on exhibited Kerry's archaeological treasures as part of its "medieval experience".

== Exhibits ==
Exhibits include an early medieval brooch, duelling pistols used by Daniel O'Connell in the early nineteenth century, and an exhibition dedicated to Antarctic explorer Tom Crean.
