= 2014 Kerry County Council election =

Part of the 2014 Irish local elections

← 2009	23 May 2014	2019 →

All 33 seats to Kerry County Council 17 seats needed for a majority
	First party	Second party	Third party
Party	Fianna Fáil	Fine Gael	Sinn Féin
Seats won	9	9	5
Seat change	▲2	▼1	▲3
	Fourth party	Fifth party	Sixth party
Party	Labour	SKIA	Independent
Seats won	2	1	7
Seat change	▼2	Steady	▲4
- Map showing the area of Kerry County Council
Council control after election
Fianna Fáil
Fine Gael

An election to all 33 seats on Kerry County Council took place on 23 May 2014 as part of the 2014 Irish local elections, an increase from 27 seats at the 2009 election. County Kerry was divided into four local electoral areas (LEAs) to elect councillors for a five-year term of office on the electoral system of proportional representation by means of the single transferable vote (PR-STV). In addition, the town councils of Killarney, Listowel and Tralee were abolished.

Fianna Fáil emerged as the largest party on the council after the elections gaining 2 additional seats, 1 in Listowel and 1 in the Killarney LEA. The party ended up with 9 seats, the same numbers as Fine Gael, who lost 1 seat overall, and who were also slightly behind Fianna Fáil in terms of first preference votes. Sinn Féin had an excellent election, winning 5 seats overall and 4 in North Kerry where had they run a third candidate in Tralee they would have won a third seat. Labour had a very bad election losing half of their seats and both councillors returned were elected for the Tralee LEA. Michael Gleeson of SKIA retained his seat as did both the Healy-Rae's and Independents returned 7 councillors overall, 8 including SKIA. The Listowel results were subject to a full recount in 2016.

== Results by party ==
Party	Seats	±	1st pref	FPv%	±%
Fianna Fáil	9	▲2	15,526	22.25	▼4.68
Fine Gael	9	▼1	15,207	21.79	▼5.58
Sinn Féin	5	▲3	9,899	14.19	▲3.78
Labour	2	▼2	4,597	6.59	▼8.39
SKIA	1	Steady	2,039	3.07	▼0.23
People Before Profit	0	Steady	390	0.56	New
Independent	7	▲4	22,009	31.54	▲15.67
Total	33	▲6	69,817	100.00	

== Results by local electoral area ==
*: Outgoing councillor.

=== Kerry South and West ===
Kerry South and West: 9 seats
Party	Candidate	FPv%	Count									
Party	Candidate	FPv%	1	2	3	4	5	6	7	8	9	10
Independent	Johnny Healy-Rae	16.8%	3,495									
Independent	Michael Cahill	11.1%	2,306									
Fianna Fáil	Michael O'Shea	8.9%	1,846	1,942	1,978	1,993	2,044	2,278				
Independent	Dan McCarthy	7.5%	1,566	1,943	1,957	2,021	2,070	2,081				
Fianna Fáil	Norma Moriarty	7.3%	1,512	1,643	1,651	1,726	1,759	1,770	1,801	1,806	1,915	2,002
Fine Gael	Seamus (Cosai) Fitzgerald	6.8%	1,413	1,466	1,467	1,468	1,481	1,634	1,709	1,740	2,577	
Fianna Fáil	Breandan Fitzgerald	6.8%	1,406	1,444	1,448	1,462	1,469	1,499	1,510	1,522		
Fine Gael	P.J. Donovan	6.3%	1,318	1,411	1,418	1,603	1,627	1,647	1,722	1,724	1,731	1,749
Fine Gael	Patrick Connor-Scarteen	6.2%	1,290	1,510	1,517	1,528	1,554	1,604	1,806	1,815	1,822	1,843
Sinn Féin	Damian Quigg	5.9%	1,227	1,325	1,342	1,422	1,492	1,520	1,630	1,649	1,764	1,886
Fianna Fáil	John Francis Flynn	4.9%	1,036	1,154	1,221	1,238	1,344	1,435	1,690	1,777	1,943	2,010
Fine Gael	Matt Griffin	3.4%	706	732	737	742	757					
Fine Gael	Johnny Porridge O'Connor	3.3%	692	749	780	785	910	988				
Independent	Donie O'Sullivan	2.4%	495	555	579	608						
Independent	Pádraig Garvey	3.2%	489	537	542							
Electorate: 32,975 Valid: 20,797 Spoilt: 221 Quota: 2,080 Turnout: 21,018 (63.7%)

=== Killarney ===
Killarney: 8 seats
Party	Candidate	FPv%	Count										
Party	Candidate	FPv%	1	2	3	4	5	6	7	8	9	10	11
Independent	Danny Healy-Rae	23.9%	4,388										
SKIA	Michael Gleeson	11.7%	2,139										
Independent	Brendan Cronin	11.2%	2,050										
Fianna Fáil	John Joe Culloty	9.2%	1,683	2,249									
Fine Gael	Bobby O'Connell	6.4%	1,176	1,321	1,340	1,343	1,381	1,395	1,406	1,423	1,522	1,572	1,619
Independent	Donal Grady	5.8%	1,064	1,236	1,250	1,264	1,308	1,371	1,435	1,539	1,586	1,725	2,006
Fine Gael	John Sheahan	5.2%	957	1,119	1,137	1,146	1,269	1,291	1,340	1,398	1,458	1,539	1,705
Fianna Fáil	Niall Kelleher	4.2%	771	1,100	1,152	1,159	1,180	1,214	1,319	1,427	1,598	1,731	1,839
Sinn Féin	John Buckley	4.0%	739	935	957	963	973	1,063	1,100	1,147	1,189	1,288	1,448
Labour	Seán Counihan	3.8%	692	805	821	835	880	920	975	1,050	1,083	1,167	
Independent	Lynda Horgan	2.9%	541	691	701	709	724	799	839	922	994		
Independent	Tom Doherty	2.5%	462	573	586	598	624	657	720				
Fianna Fáil	John O'Shea	2.5%	456	556	562	571	604	635					
Fianna Fáil	Anne McEllistrim	2.4%	441	603	631	635	657	672	741	805			
Independent	Brian McCarthy	2.1%	383	466	472	477	488						
Fine Gael	Cathal Walshe	1.9%	356	421	432	446							
Electorate: 28,741 Valid: 18,298 Spoilt: 146 Quota: 2,034 Turnout: 18,444 (64.2%)

=== Listowel ===
A full recount began of the ballots for the Listowel LEA on 10 February 2016. This followed a court case taken by Dan Kiely, who ended the original count within five votes of two elected candidates. Voters filled in the ballot for the 2014 European Parliament election simultaneously with the local election ballot, and some put preferences 1-2-3 on one ballot and 4-5-6 on the other. The returning officers' official guidelines advised to accept the latter ballots, but the Supreme Court ruled they were invalid under Article 80(2) of the Local Election Regulations 1995. When the "count afresh" began, "at least 10 ballots" were excluded based on the Supreme Court ruling. Candidates' counting agents scrutinised about 300 "doubtful" ballot papers; 32 on which they could not agree were taken under Garda Síochána escort to Limerick, where a Circuit Court judge ruled 14 of them invalid. After the eleventh and final count, in the early hours of 12 February, the same seven candidates had been returned as in 2014, with Kiely four votes behind Moloney.

Listowel: 7 seats - 2016 recount
Party	Candidate	FPv%	Count										
Party	Candidate	FPv%	1	2	3	4	5	6	7	8	9	10	11
Fianna Fáil	John Brassil	12.93%	1,905	1,905	1,905	1,905	1,843						
Sinn Féin	Robert Beasley	12.62%	1,859	1,859	1,859	1,859	1,859	1,843					
Fine Gael	Aoife Thornton	10.76%	1,586	1,619	1,639	1,820	1,832	1,833	1,901	1,843			
Sinn Féin	Dianne Nolan	8.62%	1,270	1,291	1,348	1,384	1,388	1,396	1,480	1,490	1,546	1,681	1,843
Fine Gael	Liam Purtill	7.06%	1,040	1,056	1,095	1,111	1,113	1,113	1,135	1,142	1,329	1,413	1,573
Fianna Fáil	Jimmy Moloney	6.82%	1,005	1,023	1,045	1,060	1,081	1,082	1,187	1,194	1,276	1,382	1,523
Independent	Dan Kiely	6.32%	932	958	989	1,040	1,049	1,050	1,135	1,138	1,185	1,408	1,517
Fine Gael	Mike Kennelly	5.74%	846	853	877	891	893	893	985	998	1,237	1,339	1,521
Fine Gael	Tim Buckley	5.65%	833	855	866	876	881	882	922	928	0		
Independent	Michael O'Gorman	5.44%	802	848	940	985	987	990	1074	1079	1128	0	
Labour	Pat Leahy	5.15%	759	771	794	912	915	916	964	970	1,134	1,232	0
Independent	Tom Walsh	4.47%	659	695	711	718	720	0					
Labour	Katie Lucid McCabe	3.83%	565	578	592	0							
People Before Profit	Brian Finucane	2.65%	390	426	0								
Independent	Kate Carmody	1.93%	285	0									
Electorate: 24,685 (59.8%) Valid: 14,736 Spoilt: 194 Quota: 1,843 Turnout: 14,930 (60.5%)

Listowel: 7 seats - Original 2014 count
Party	Candidate	FPv%	Count										
Party	Candidate	FPv%	1	2	3	4	5	6	7	8	9	10	11
Fianna Fáil	John Brassil	12.96%	1,912										
Sinn Féin	Robert Beasley	12.61%	1,861										
Fine Gael	Aoife Thornton	10.29%	1,518	1,619	1,639	1,822	1,836	1,837	1,904				
Sinn Féin	Dianne Nolan	8.61%	1,271	1,291	1,348	1,385	1,389	1,397	1,480	1,490	1,546	1,680	1,841
Fine Gael	Liam Purtill	7.06%	1,042	1,056	1,095	1,113	1,115	1,115	1,137	1,144	1,331	1,414	1,574
Fianna Fáil	Jimmy Moloney	6.82%	1,006	1,023	1,045	1,061	1,084	1,085	1,191	1,198	1,281	1,388	1,529
Independent	Dan Kiely	6.34%	935	958	989	1,043	1,053	1,054	1,139	1,142	1,189	1,414	1,524
Fine Gael	Mike Kennelly	5.74%	847	853	877	893	895	895	987	1,000	1,239	1,341	1,526
Fine Gael	Tim Buckley	5.65%	833	855	866	876	880	881	921	926			
Independent	Michael O'Gorman	5.44%	802	848	940	986	988	991	1,076	1,081	1,130		
Labour	Pat Leahy	5.14%	759	771	794	912	916	917	965	971	1,135	1,233	
Independent	Tom Walsh	4.47%	659	675	711	718	720	720					
Labour	Katie Lucid McCabe	3.84%	566	578	592								
People Before Profit	Brian Finucane	2.64%	390	426									
Independent	Kate Carmody	1.93%	285										
Electorate: 24,685 (59.8%) Valid: 14,756 Spoilt: 173 Quota: 1,845 Turnout: 14,929 (60.5%)

=== Tralee ===
Tralee: 9 seats
Party	Candidate	FPv%	Count								
Party	Candidate	FPv%	1	2	3	4	5	6	7	8	9
Sinn Féin	Toiréasa Ferris	16.8%	2,679								
Sinn Féin	Pa Daly	13.3%	2,122								
Fianna Fáil	Norma Foley	9.6%	1,541	1,680							
Labour	Terry O'Brien	8.0%	1,285	1,402	1,469	1,574	1,584	1,649			
Fine Gael	Jim Finucane	7.8%	1,242	1,310	1,352	1,387	1,390	1,460	1,671		
Fine Gael	Pat McCarthy	7.3%	1,160	1,247	1,262	1,283	1,294	1,331	1,436	1,468	1,564
Fianna Fáil	Tom McEllistrim	6.8%	1,087	1,184	1,215	1,231	1,246	1,284	1,319	1,322	1,569
Labour	Graham Spring	5.6%	899	970	997	1,046	1,051	1,080	1,238	1,255	1,431
Fianna Fáil	Ted Fitzgerald	5.2%	829	886	927	946	957	996	1,047	1,056	
Independent	Sam Locke	5.1%	815	933	1,051	1,081	1,089	1,253	1,316	1,321	1,439
Independent	Johnnie Wall	4.8%	763	871	934	973	978	1,063	1,152	1,158	1,304
Fine Gael	Grace O'Donnell	4.1%	657	701	725	795	802	836			
Independent	Tommy Collins	3.2%	511	631	697	725	731				
Labour	Gillian Wharton-Slattery	2.5%	396	450	479						
Electorate: 30,300 Valid: 15,986 Spoilt: 224 Quota: 1,599 Turnout: 16,210 (53.5%)

== Changes ==
=== Co-options ===
Party	Outgoing	LEA	Reason	Date	Co-optee
Fianna Fáil	John Brassil	Listowel	Elected to the 32nd Dáil at the 2016 general election.	14 March 2016	John Lucid
Independent	Danny Healy-Rae	Killarney	Elected to the 32nd Dáil at the 2016 general election.	14 March 2016	Maura Healy-Rae
Sinn Féin	Dianne Nolan	Listowel	Resigned seat to take up a new job.	23 October 2017	Tom Barry

=== Changes in affiliation ===
Name	LEA	Elected as	New affiliation	Date
Michael Cahill	Kerry South and West	Independent	Fianna Fáil	16 July 2016
