= Headford Ambush =

1921 IRA ambush

- Part of the Irish War of Independence
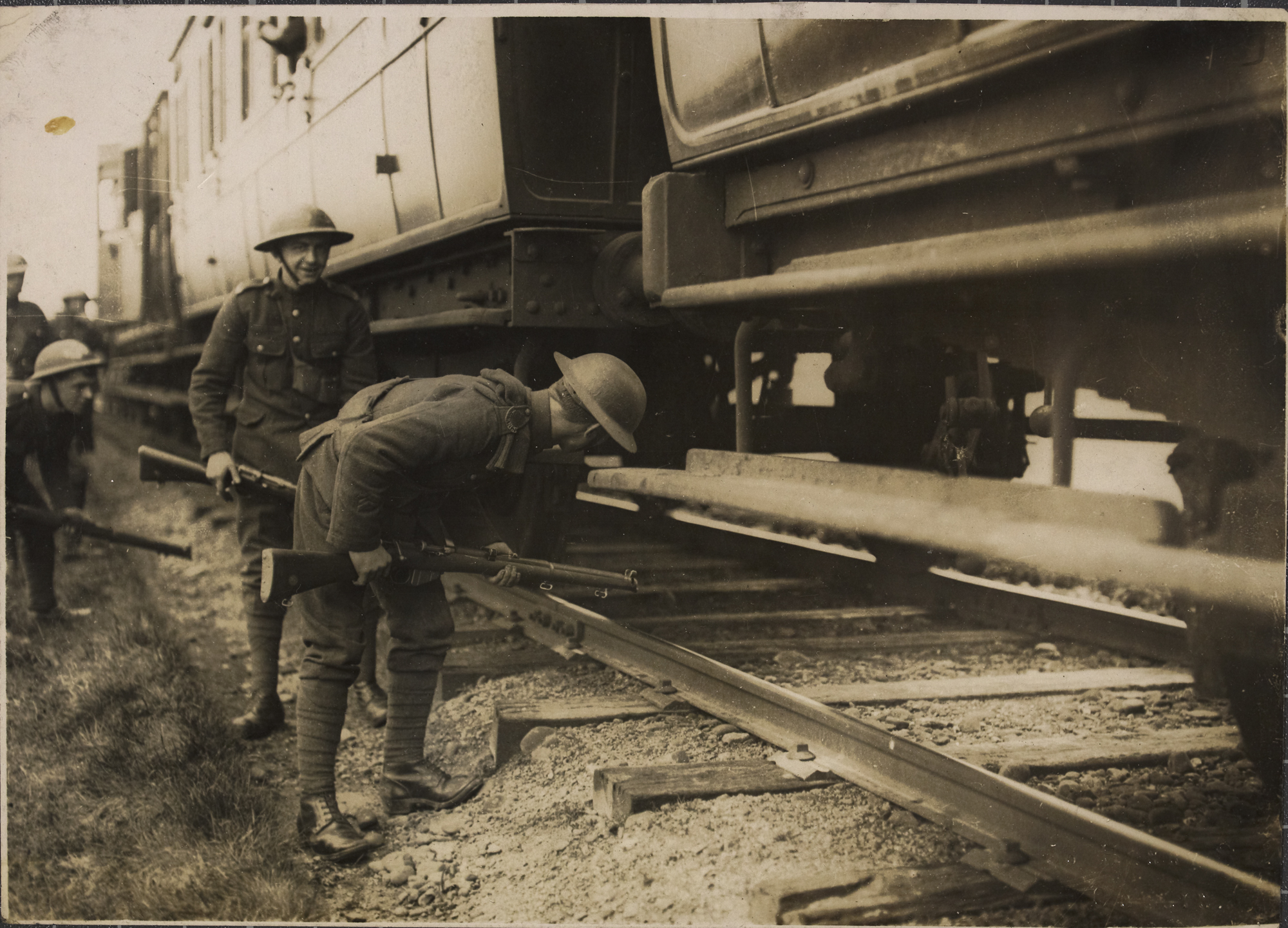
- British soldiers searching a train in County Kerry, 1921
| Date | 21 March 1921 |
| Location | Headford Junction railway station (near Killarney), County Kerry, Ireland 52.041°N 9.344°W |
| Result | Indecisive |

Belligerents
| Irish Republican Army | United Kingdom |

Commanders and leaders
| Tom McEllistrim; Danny Allman † | C. F. Adams † |

Strength
| 32 volunteers | 30 soldiers in first train, more arrive in a second train |

Casualties and losses
| 2 killed | 9 killed (British sources); 25 killed (IRA sources) |
- 3 civilians killed, 2 wounded in ambush 1 alleged informer killed by the IRA in the aftermath
- Location within island of Ireland

The Headford Ambush was carried out by the Irish Republican Army (IRA) on 21 March 1921, during the Irish War of Independence. The IRA's 2nd Kerry Brigade ambushed a train carrying British troops of the Royal Fusiliers at Headford Junction railway station near Killarney, County Kerry. This sparked a battle lasting almost an hour, in which at least 13 people were killed – nine British soldiers, two IRA volunteers and three civilians. The IRA withdrew after another train carrying British troops arrived.

== Background ==
The Irish War of Independence, a guerrilla conflict by the Irish Republican Army (IRA) against British rule in Ireland, had been ongoing since 1919. Several IRA brigades were established in County Kerry, which targeting British forces stationed in the county (consisting of the Royal Irish Constabulary (RIC) and the British Army). The IRA established a police presence in the county and intimidated individuals suspected of having intentions to join either the Army or the RIC. In July 1920, the Black and Tans were deployed to the county, and "began to engage in wholesale intimidation and violence against civilians without any provocation." Between 1 and 9 November 1920, the Tans laid siege to Tralee, refusing to let any supplies come into the town.

By early 1921, British forces "believed that they had the upper hand in the county", with a RIC inspector in the county maintaining "that the I.R.A. had lost much of their fighting capabilities, and that they would never 'regain the hold they had on the popular imagination' and the police were now capable of travelling wherever they wanted in the County." This was in their view due to the aggressive policy of reprisals they had undertaken in response to IRA attacks in County Kerry. However, as noted by historian Thomas Earls Fitzgerald, IRA activity consistently increased in spring of that year, being bolstered by the arrival of Andrew Cooney from Dublin in February 1921, who formed a flying column on 2 March and made plans to launch attacks against British forces. Three days later, IRA volunteers from the No. 2 Kerry Brigade launched a successful ambush on a British Army convoy, killing several soldiers including Brigadier-General Hanway Robert Cumming.

Upon hearing of news of the ambush, Chief of Staff of the Irish Republican Army Richard Mulcahy, who was impressed with the IRA's performance in County Kerry, wrote to the officer commanding of the No. 2 Kerry Brigade Humphry Murphy, writing that "I hope that now that Kerry No.2 is definitely beginning to throw itself properly into the war, that no opportunity, however, small will be lost to show that Kerry is not going to be behind any other Brigade in a matter of initiative and in the matter of ability to strike a blow."

== Ambush ==
On 21 March, an IRA party of the 2nd Kerry Brigade commanded by Tom McEllistrim and Dan Allman were billeted about four miles from the Headford railway junction when they heard that British troops were returning by train from Kenmare to Tralee. As the train did not go directly, the British would have to change at Headford, making them vulnerable to ambush. Allman, commanding 30 volunteers, reached the junction only 12 minutes before the train, which was carrying 30 soldiers of the 1st Battalion of the Royal Fusiliers. The railway staff just had time to flee before the train pulled into the platform, where its passengers had to change trains for Tralee. Alongside the soldiers, the train was packed with cattle and pig farmers, on their way back from the market in Kenmare. Most of the civilians had already got off when the British soldiers began to disembark. Allman himself tried to disarm a Fusilier but shot him when he resisted. Other accounts say the soldier was shot dead as he went to use the lavatory. This was the signal for the IRA to open fire on the British troops.

One of the first British casualties was Lieutenant CE Adams DCM, who was shot dead when he appeared at the carriage door, as were several other soldiers who were standing in front of the engine. The surviving British troops opened fire from the train, while those who had got off scrambled underneath it for cover. Dan Allman moved to the end of the platform and knelt down to fire at the soldiers under the train but was shot in the heart. In the ensuing close-quarter firefight, conducted at a range of just 20 yards, three civilians and two IRA volunteers (Allman and Volunteer Jimmy Baily who was killed while throwing a grenade under the train) were killed. Two-thirds of the British force is estimated to have been killed or wounded. Most of those killed were hit in the initial firing. British casualties were limited because the IRA gunmen had no direct field of fire into the troops who were hidden under the train.

McEllistrim called on the survivors to surrender and when they refused, the IRA began to move in to finish off those who kept shooting, by throwing hand grenades under the train. Just as they were doing so, another train pulled into the junction, carrying another party of British troops. The IRA column had used most of its ammunition and was forced to retreat, escaping toward the hills in the south.

== Aftermath ==
The British Army reported that seven soldiers were killed outright and that two more were fatally wounded. There were a further twelve non-fatal injuries among the troops. The IRA however thought there were far more British casualties. One of the attackers recalled, "twelve coffins left Killarney later and that wasn't all". Tom McEllistrim reported to his superiors that as many as 25 British soldiers had been killed. Allman and another IRA guerrilla, Lt Jimmy Baily, were killed in the ambush. One civilian was killed outright and two mortally wounded, with two others (a father and daughter) seriously wounded. In the immediate aftermath of the ambush, McEllistrim summarily executed a suspected spy whom his men had captured.

== See also ==
- Upton train ambush
