= Kerry Independent Alliance =

Political party in Country Kerry, Ireland

- Leader: John O'Donoghue
- Founder: Michael Gleeson
- Founded: 1992
- Split from: Labour Party
- Headquarters: High Street, Killarney, County Kerry
- Ideology: Localism
- Local government: 1 / 949

The Kerry Independent Alliance is a minor political party in the Republic of Ireland. It was established as the South Kerry Independent Alliance (SKIA) by former Labour Party members in the 1990s based in the Kerry South constituency. Since 1999, it has only contested local elections in the Killarney area in County Kerry, and its only candidate has been Michael Gleeson, who was a Killarney town councillor from 1991 to 2014, and a Kerry County Councillor from 1999 to 2021.

Gleeson was de-selected by the Labour Party as a candidate to contest the 1992 general election in favour of Breeda Moynihan-Cronin, which led to him leaving the party and later forming the SKIA with his supporters. The SKIA discussed a merger with the Labour Party in 2006, with Gleeson as the proposed Labour Party candidate at the 2007 general election, after Moynihan-Cronin announced her intention to retire from Dáil Éireann. However, the talks failed, Moynihan-Cronin stood for re-election, and subsequently lost her seat.

Michael Gleeson unsuccessfully contested the 2011 general election, again in the Kerry South Constituency.

At the 2016 general election Kerry South was merged with most of Kerry North–West Limerick to create a new Kerry constituency, as a result the party changed its name to the Kerry Independent Alliance. In January 2016, the party decided not to contest the February election; Radio Kerry said this was due to Gleeson's work commitments, while The Irish Times said he expected a second election later in the year when brighter evenings would make canvassing easier.

In May 2021, Michael Gleeson retired from politics and was replaced on Kerry County Council by his nephew John O'Donoghue. O'Donoghue was re-elected in the 2024 Kerry County Council election.

== Election results ==
=== Dáil Éireann ===
Election	Leader	FPv	%	Seats	±
1997	Michael Gleeson	1,388 (#9)	3.9%	0 / 3	new
2011	Michael Gleeson	4,939 (#6)	11.1%	0 / 3	Steady

=== Council elections ===
Election	Leader	FPv	%	Seats	±
1999	Michael Gleeson	1,478 (#5)	2.3%	1 / 27	new
2004	Michael Gleeson	1,618 (#5)	2.2%	1 / 27	Steady
2009	Michael Gleeson	2,536 (#5)	3.3%	1 / 27	Steady
2014	Michael Gleeson	2,039 (#5)	3.1%	1 / 33	Steady
2019	Michael Gleeson	1,983 (#5)	2.9%	1 / 33	Steady
2024	John O'Donoghue	1,574 (#5)	2.1%	1 / 33	Steady
