= University Hospital Kerry =

- Health Service Executive
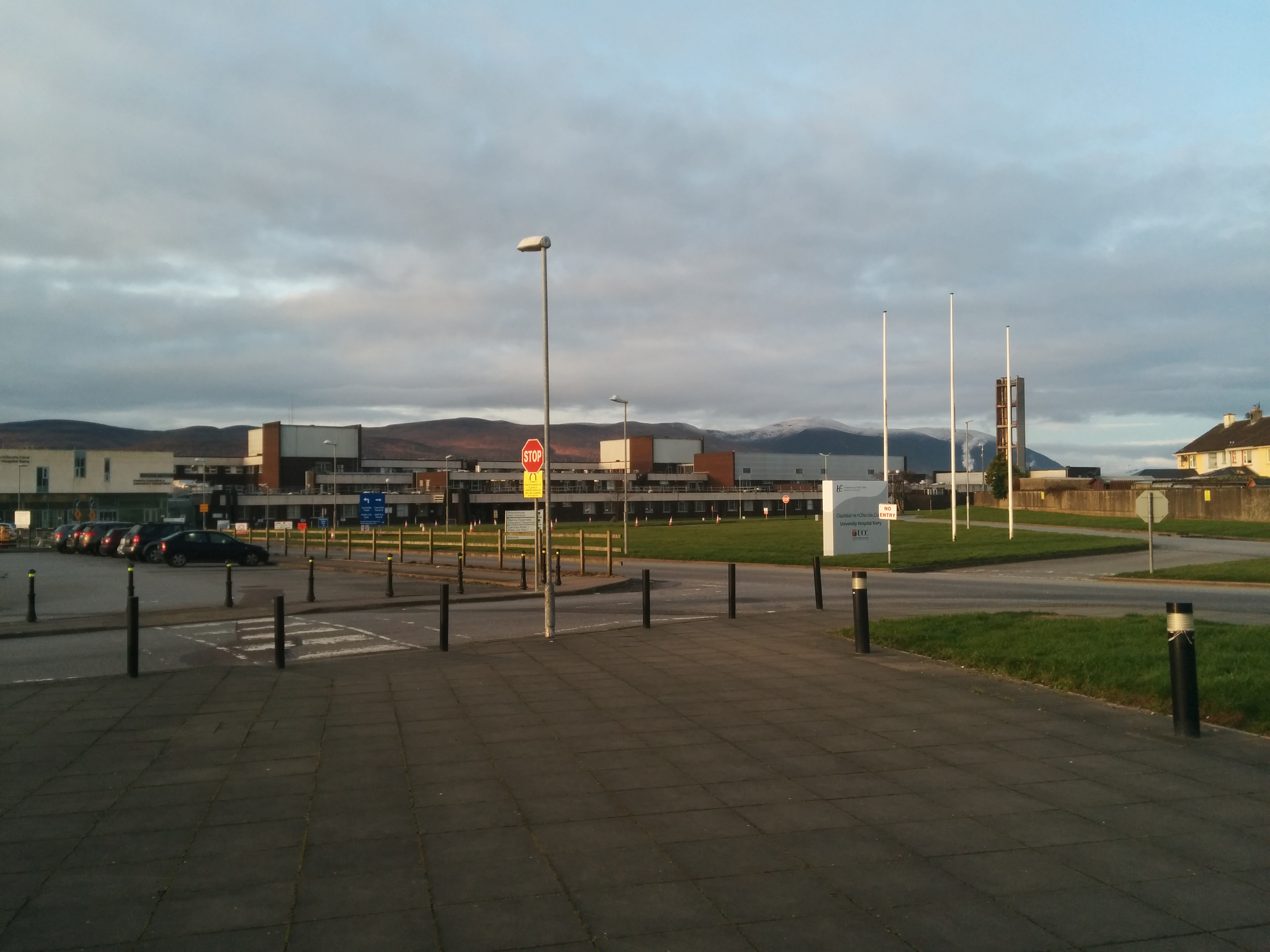
- University Hospital Kerry

- Shown in Ireland

Geography
- Location: Rathass, Tralee, County Kerry, Ireland
- Coordinates: 52.2655°N 9.6874°W

Organisation
- Type: General
- Affiliated university: University College Cork

Services
- Emergency department: Yes Accident & Emergency
- Beds: 377

Helipads
- Helipad: Yes

History
- Founded: 1984

Links
- Website: www.hse.ie/eng/services/list/5/kerryhealthservices/uhk/
- Lists: Hospitals in the Republic of Ireland

University Hospital Kerry (Irish: Ospidéal Ollscoile Chiarraí) is a public hospital in Quill Street, Tralee, County Kerry, Ireland. It is managed by South/Southwest Hospital Group.

== History ==
The hospital was commissioned to replace the aging St Catherine's Hospital on the north side of Quill Street in Tralee. The new hospital, which was built on a site to the south of the old hospital, opened as the Tralee General Hospital in 1984. After evolving to become Kerry General Hospital, it was renamed University Hospital Kerry in February 2016.

== Services ==
The hospital provides acute services and has 377 beds and delivers nearly 1,500 babies a year. It is affiliated with University College Cork.
