= County Hall, Tralee =

Municipal building in County Kerry, Ireland

County Hall
- Áras an Chontae, Trá Lí
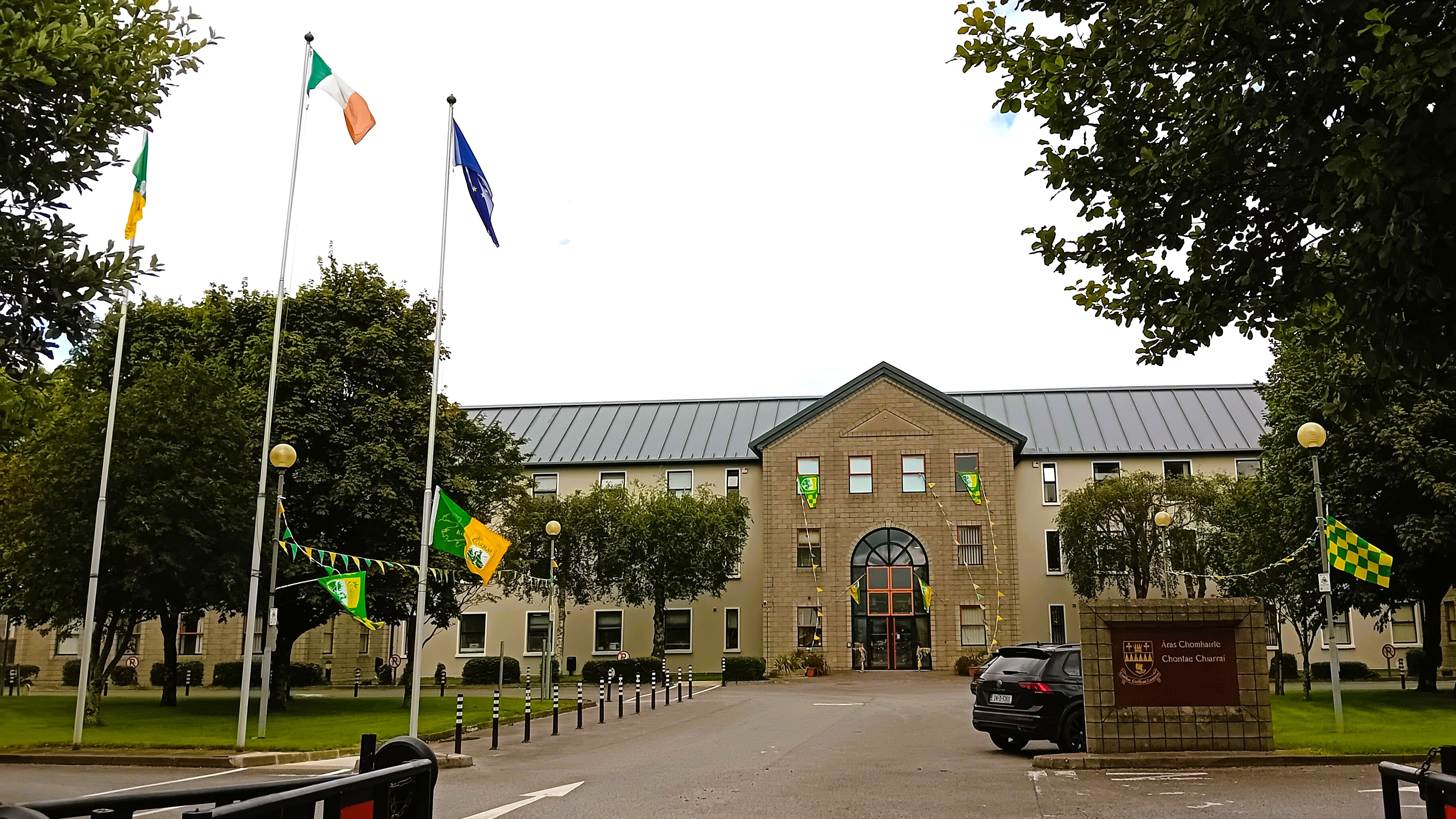
- The building's main entrance

- Location within Ireland

General information
- Architectural style: Neoclassical style
- Location: Tralee, County Kerry, Ireland
- Coordinates: 52.2661°N 9.6789°W
- Completed: 1842

Design and construction
- Architect: George Wilkinson

County Hall (Irish: Áras an Chontae, Trá Lí) is a municipal building in the Rathass district of Tralee, County Kerry, Ireland.

== History ==
The main building, which was designed by George Wilkinson for use as the Tralee Union Workhouse, was completed in September 1842. The workhouse infirmary evolved to become St Catherine's Hospital in the 1930s but, after the transfer of the patients to Tralee General Hospital, the St Catherine's Hospital closed in 1984. The site was acquired by Kerry County Council, who had previously been based in the Ashe Memorial Hall, and the main hospital building was converted for use as the county council headquarters. It officially opened in its new role in January 1989.

An additional building on the south east corner of the site, which was completed in 2000, has accommodated the Housing Department staff since 2015.
