= 2004 Kerry County Council election =

2004 Irish local government election

- 11 June 2004

All 27 seats on Kerry County Council
	First party	Second party	Third party
Party	Fianna Fáil	Fine Gael	Labour
Seats won	11	8	2
Seat change	▼1	▲2	▼1
	Fourth party	Fifth party	Sixth party
Party	Sinn Féin	SKIA	Independent
Seats won	2	1	3
Seat change	▲1	Steady	▼1
- Aea of Kerry County Council

An election to Kerry County Council took place on 11 June 2004 as part of that year's Irish local elections. 27 councillors were elected from five local electoral areas by PR-STV voting for a five-year term of office.

== Results by party ==
Party	Seats	±	First Pref. votes	FPv%	±%
Fianna Fáil	11	▼1	27,689	37.47	▼2.33
Fine Gael	8	▲2	18,346	24.82	▲1.33
Labour	2	▼1	8,502	11.50	▼2.83
Sinn Féin	2	▲1	5,809	7.86	▲1.87
SKIA	1	Steady	1,618	2.19	▼0.13
Green	0	Steady	745	1.01	▲0.62
Progressive Democrats	0	Steady	462	0.63	New
Independent	3	▼1	10,735	14.53	▲0.84
Totals	27	Steady	73,906	100.00	

== Results by local electoral area ==
=== Dingle ===
Dingle - 3 seats
Party	Candidate	FPv%	Count			
Party	Candidate	FPv%	1	2	3	4
Fianna Fáil	Michael O'Shea*	23.04	1,898	2,087		
Fianna Fáil	Breandan MacGearailt*	19.58	1,613	1,695	1,834	1,872
Fine Gael	Seamus (Cosai) Fitzgerald*	19.00	1,565	1,673	2,163	
Independent	Brigid O'Connor	14.52	1,196	1,433	1,744	1,809
Fine Gael	Brendan Griffin	12.67	1,044	1,239		
Labour	Owen O'Shea	7.00	577			
Sinn Féin	Pat O'Shea	4.19	345			
Electorate: 11,918 Valid: 8,238 (69.12%) Spoilt: 75 Quota: 2,060 Turnout: 8,313 (69.75%)

=== Killarney ===
Killarney - 6 seats
Party	Candidate	FPv%	Count							
Party	Candidate	FPv%	1	2	3	4	5	6	7	8
Fianna Fáil	Tom Fleming*	17.52	3,038							
Independent	Brendan Cronin*	11.69	2,027	2,094	2,127	2,179	2,323	2,414	2,582	
Fianna Fáil	Colin Miller	10.62	1,842	1,913	1,942	1,975	2,041	2,144	2,745	
Independent	Danny Healy-Rae*	10.44	1,811	1,902	1,948	2,033	2,097	2,192	2,337	2,393
SKIA	Michael Gleeson*	9.33	1,618	1,652	1,701	1,798	2,000	2,168	2,445	2,577
Fianna Fáil	Brian O'Leary*	8.08	1,402	1,527	1,540	1,573	1,625	1,740		
Fine Gael	Tom Sheahan	7.78	1,349	1,481	1,482	1,659	1,998	2,069	2,186	2,226
Labour	Seán O'Grady	6.07	1,052	1,071	1,113	1,384	1,449	1,767	1,943	1,982
Independent	Donal Grady	5.78	1,003	1,022	1,047	1,090	1,146			
Fine Gael	Sheila Casey	5.43	942	964	1,022	1,059				
Labour	Andrew McCarthy*	4.88	846	876	904					
Independent	Tom Randles	1.33	231	238						
Green	Bea O'Neill	1.06	184	187						
Electorate: 24,541 Valid: 17,345 (70.68%) Spoilt: 197 Quota: 2,478 Turnout: 17,542 (71.48%)

=== Killorglin ===
Killorglin - 5 seats
Party	Candidate	FPv%	Count							
Party	Candidate	FPv%	1	2	3	4	5	6	7	8
Independent	Michael Healy-Rae*	15.11	1,973	1,987	2,051	2,115	2,154	2,236		
Fine Gael	Johnny (Porridge) O'Connor	14.10	1,841	1,860	1,873	1,897	2,075	2,243		
Fianna Fáil	Paul O'Donoghue*	14.01	1,829	1,833	1,841	1,869	1,917	1,975	2,093	2,097
Fine Gael	P.J. Donovan*	13.25	1,730	1,743	1,750	1,789	1,795	1,933	1,945	1,960
Fianna Fáil	Michael Cahill*	12.47	1,628	1,646	1,649	1,661	1,902	2,010	2,142	2,174
Fine Gael	Michael Connor-Scarteen*	9.62	1,256	1,264	1,351	1,375	1,382	1,455	2,041	2,057
Fianna Fáil	Dan McCarthy	6.94	906	907	943	983	994	1,016		
Labour	Donal Barry	4.83	631	641	664	719	759			
Fianna Fáil	Liam Crowley	4.38	572	581	583	593				
Sinn Féin	Michael O'Leary	2.44	318	320	325					
Independent	Denis McCarthy	2.02	264	267						
Independent	Tom Lyons	0.82	107							
Electorate: 19,035 Valid: 13,055 (68.58%) Spoilt: 172 Quota: 2,176 Turnout: 13,227 (69.49%)

=== Listowel ===
Listowel - 6 seats
Party	Candidate	FPv%	Count									
Party	Candidate	FPv%	1	2	3	4	5	6	7	8	9	10
Fianna Fáil	Ned O'Sullivan*	12.00	1,922	2,002	2,029	2,153	2,193	2,465				
Fianna Fáil	John Brassil*	10.96	1,755	1,782	1,852	1,872	2,060	2,137	2,170	2,512		
Fine Gael	Tim Buckley*	10.16	1,627	1,683	1,691	1,874	1,888	2,035	2,055	2,405		
Fine Gael	Liam Purtill*	9.35	1,498	1,557	1,567	1,652	1,670	1,749	1,760	1,954	1,984	2,088
Labour	Pat Leahy*	8.98	1,438	1,488	1,714	1,770	1,824	2,099	2,142	2,273	2,313	
Fianna Fáil	Dan Kiely*	8.75	1,402	1,461	1,500	1,545	1,591	1,724	1,778	1,852	1,908	1,916
Sinn Féin	Robert Beasley	8.49	1,360	1,454	1,466	1,493	1,927	1,990	1,999	2,070	2,077	2,081
Fine Gael	Bernie Behan	6.89	1,103	1,117	1,277	1,337	1,410	1,450	1,456			
Fianna Fáil	William Sheehan	6.37	1,020	1,049	1,077	1,171	1,189					
Sinn Féin	Risteard O Fuarain	5.72	916	926	989	1,007						
Fine Gael	Denis Stack	4.46	715	734	752							
Labour	Michael O'Keeffe	4.39	703	716								
Progressive Democrats	Gerard Burke	2.88	462									
Independent	Padraig O'Sullivan	0.61	98									
Electorate: 24,738 Valid: 16,019 (64.75%) Spoilt: 254 Quota: 2,289 Turnout: 16,273 (65.78%)

=== Tralee ===
Tralee - 7 seats
Party	Candidate	FPv%	Count								
Party	Candidate	FPv%	1	2	3	4	5	6	7	8	9
Labour	Terry O'Brien*	12.47	2,401	2,453							
Fianna Fáil	Anne McEllistrim*	12.39	2,385	2,408							
Sinn Féin	Toireasa Ferris*	12.17	2,343	2,619							
Fine Gael	Bobby O'Connell*	8.63	1,662	1,663	1,663	1,673	1,783	1,798	2,099	2,115	2,211
Fianna Fáil	Norma Foley*	7.64	1,471	1,487	1,495	1,540	1,588	1,764	1,942	2,051	2,220
Fianna Fáil	Ted Fitzgerald*	7.23	1,391	1,407	1,414	1,436	1,479	1,622	1,752	1,857	2,034
Fine Gael	Pat McCarthy	7.19	1,384	1,394	1,403	1,453	1,646	1,687	1,755	1,835	2,013
Independent	Billy Leen*	6.49	1,249	1,272	1,303	1,369	1,402	1,443	1,495	1,680	1,835
Fianna Fáil	Charlie Farrelly	4.54	873	875	877	889	897	925			
Labour	Donal Tobin	4.44	854	865	877	988	1,063	1,187	1,214	1,390	
Independent	Tommy Foley	4.03	776	809	834	888	915	989	1,000		
Fianna Fáil	Johnnie Wall	3.85	742	761	772	807	829				
Fine Gael	John Shanahan	3.27	630	630	631	660					
Green	David Grey	2.91	561	570	582						
Sinn Féin	Maisie Houlihan	2.74	527								
Electorate: 32,127 Valid: 19,249 (59.92%) Spoilt: 335 Quota: 2,407 Turnout: 19,584 (60.96%)
