= Breeda Moynihan-Cronin =

Irish former politician (born 1953

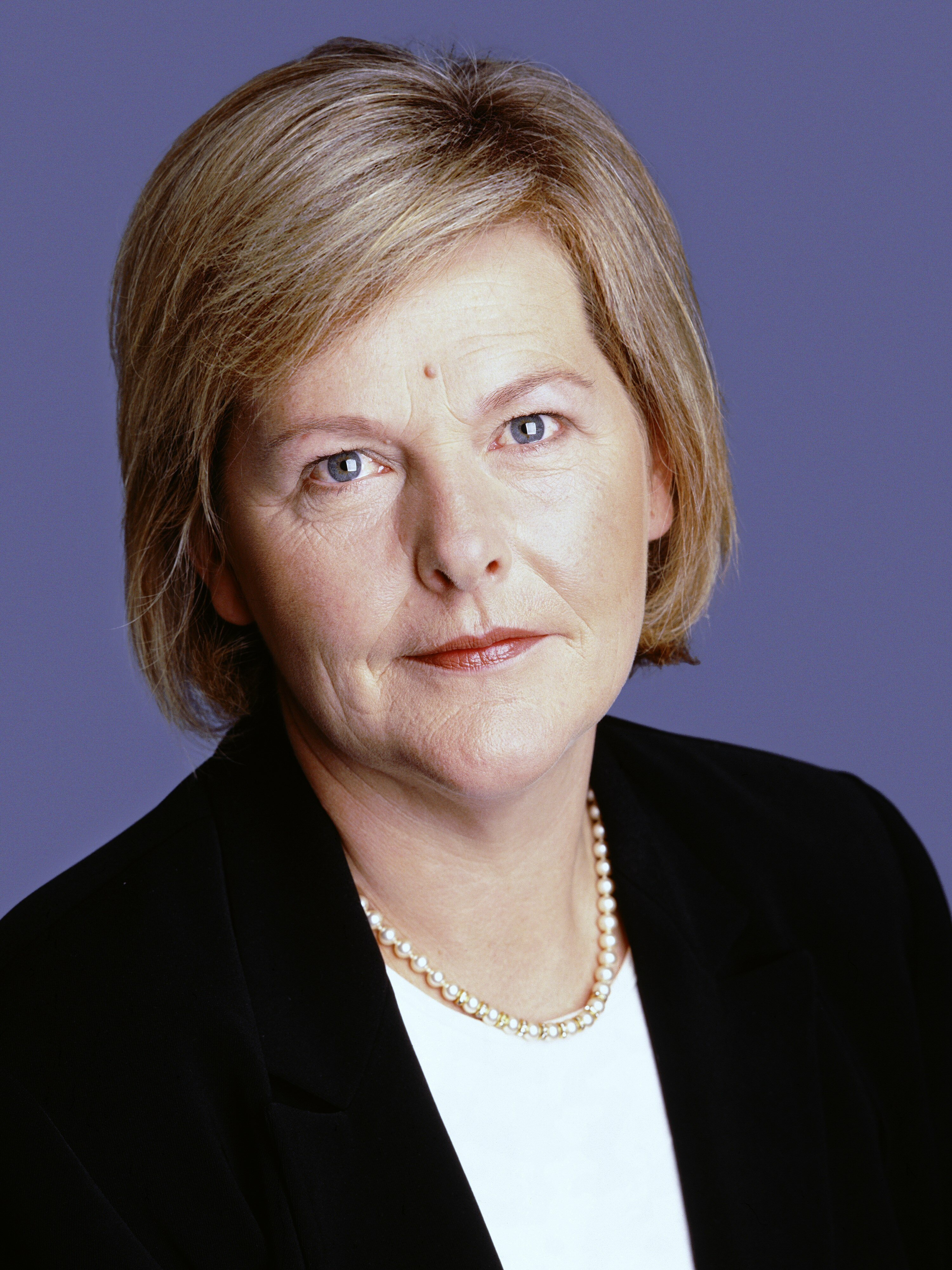
- Moynihan-Cronin, c. 2002

Teachta Dála
- In office November 1992 – May 2007
- Constituency: Kerry South

Personal details
- Born: 31 March 1953 (age 73) Cork, Ireland
- Party: Labour Party
- Parent: Michael Moynihan (father)
- Education: Skerry's College

Breeda Moynihan-Cronin (née Moynihan; born 31 March 1953) is an Irish former Labour Party politician who served as a Teachta Dála (TD) for the Kerry South constituency from 1992 to 2007.

She was born in Cork in 1953, but is a native of Killarney, County Kerry. She was educated at St. Brigid's Secondary School, Killarney; Dominican College Sion Hill, Dublin; and Skerry's College, Cork. Her father, Michael Moynihan, was a TD for Kerry South from 1981 to 1987 and from 1989 to 1992. She worked as a bank official before becoming involved in politics in 1991 when she was elected to Kerry County Council. She was first elected to Dáil Éireann at the 1992 general election as a Labour Party TD for Kerry South, succeeding her father. She was re-elected at every election until 2007.

She held a number of Front Bench positions in the Labour Party, including, Spokesperson on Justice, Equality and Law Reform (1997–1998), Social, Community and Family Affairs (1998–1999 and again 2002–2003), Tourism and Recreation (1999–2002), and Equality and Law Reform (2003–2007). Moynihan–Cronin is a former chairperson of the Labour Party.

On 11 October 2005, she announced that she would not stand for re-election at the forthcoming general election due to ill-health. Her decision to retire presented considerable difficulties for the Labour Party to retain her seat, as the party had performed poorly at the 2004 Kerry County Council election, failing to elect any councillors within the county. However, on 28 October 2006, she announced that she would stand in the forthcoming general election, having overcome her health difficulties. However, she failed to retain her seat.

In June 2011, she returned to politics when she was co-opted onto Kerry County Council to represent the Killarney area, filling the seat left vacant when Marie Moloney was elected to the 24th Seanad. In 2013, she stood down from the council and was replaced by Sean Counihan.

Party political offices
Preceded by ?	Chair of the Labour Party; 2003–2007	Succeeded by Brian O'Shea

Dáil	Election	Deputy (Party)	Deputy (Party)	Deputy (Party)
9th	1937	John Flynn (FF)	Frederick Crowley (FF)	Fionán Lynch (FG)
10th	1938	John Flynn (FF)	Frederick Crowley (FF)	Fionán Lynch (FG)
11th	1943	John Healy (FF)	Frederick Crowley (FF)	Fionán Lynch (FG)
12th	1944	John Healy (FF)	Frederick Crowley (FF)	Fionán Lynch (FG)
12th	1944 by-election	John Healy (FF)	Frederick Crowley (FF)	Donal O'Donoghue (FF)
12th	1945 by-election	John Healy (FF)	Honor Crowley (FF)	Donal O'Donoghue (FF)
13th	1948	John Flynn (Ind.)	Honor Crowley (FF)	Patrick Palmer (FG)
14th	1951	John Flynn (Ind.)	Honor Crowley (FF)	Patrick Palmer (FG)
15th	1954	John Flynn (FF)	Honor Crowley (FF)	Patrick Palmer (FG)
16th	1957	John Joe Rice (SF)	Honor Crowley (FF)	Patrick Palmer (FG)
17th	1961	Timothy O'Connor (FF)	Honor Crowley (FF)	Patrick Connor (FG)
18th	1965	Timothy O'Connor (FF)	Honor Crowley (FF)	Patrick Connor (FG)
18th	1966 by-election	Timothy O'Connor (FF)	John O'Leary (FF)	Patrick Connor (FG)
19th	1969	Timothy O'Connor (FF)	John O'Leary (FF)	Michael Begley (FG)
20th	1973	Timothy O'Connor (FF)	John O'Leary (FF)	Michael Begley (FG)
21st	1977	Timothy O'Connor (FF)	John O'Leary (FF)	Michael Begley (FG)
22nd	1981	Michael Moynihan (Lab)	John O'Leary (FF)	Michael Begley (FG)
23rd	1982 (Feb)	Michael Moynihan (Lab)	John O'Leary (FF)	Michael Begley (FG)
24th	1982 (Nov)	Michael Moynihan (Lab)	John O'Leary (FF)	Michael Begley (FG)
25th	1987	John O'Donoghue (Note: O'Donoghue served as Ceann Comhairle in the 30th Dáil from 2007 to 2009.) (FF)	John O'Leary (FF)	Michael Begley (FG)
26th	1989	John O'Donoghue (FF)	John O'Leary (FF)	Michael Moynihan (Lab)
27th	1992	John O'Donoghue (FF)	John O'Leary (FF)	Breeda Moynihan-Cronin (Lab)
28th	1997	John O'Donoghue (FF)	Jackie Healy-Rae (Ind.)	Breeda Moynihan-Cronin (Lab)
29th	2002	John O'Donoghue (FF)	Jackie Healy-Rae (Ind.)	Breeda Moynihan-Cronin (Lab)
30th	2007	John O'Donoghue (FF)	Jackie Healy-Rae (Ind.)	Tom Sheahan (FG)
31st	2011	Tom Fleming (Ind.)	Michael Healy-Rae (Ind.)	Brendan Griffin (FG)
32nd	2016	Constituency abolished. See Kerry		
