= Marie Moloney =

Irish politician (born 1958)

Kerry County Councillor
- Incumbent
- Assumed office May 2019
- In office June 2009 – April 2011
- Constituency: Killarney

Senator
- In office 25 May 2011 – 8 June 2016
- Constituency: Labour Panel

Personal details
- Born: 26 August 1958 (age 67) County Kerry, Ireland
- Party: Labour Party

Marie Moloney (born 26 August 1958) is an Irish Labour Party politician and former member of Seanad Éireann.

From Coolick, Kilcummin, near Killarney, Moloney was educated at the local national school and at Killarney Technical College. From 1992 to 2007 she was constituency secretary of Breeda Moynihan-Cronin, who was then a Labour Party TD for the Kerry South constituency. She was elected to Kerry County Council at the 2009 local elections for the Killarney local electoral area, and was elected deputy mayor of County Kerry in June 2010. She unsuccessfully contested the Kerry South constituency at the 2011 general election. In April 2011 she was elected to Seanad Éireann on the Labour Panel. Moloney was once again elected to Kerry County Council at the 2019 and 2024 council elections for the Killarney local electoral area.

She is an official with the trade union SIPTU. She was the Labour Party Seanad spokesperson on Social Protection. During the debate on the Protection of Life During Pregnancy Bill 2013 in July 2013, she made an emotional appeal to senators to desist from using emotive language during the debate.
