= Lackabaun =

Townland in County Kerry, Ireland

Coordinates: 52°15′37″N 9°29′13″W

Lackabaun (Irish: An Leaca Bhán, meaning 'the white hillside') is a townland 2 miles (3.2 km) north of Castleisland in the parish of Castleisland, County Kerry, in the southwest of Ireland. It covers 608 acres (2.46 km^{2}; 0.95 sq mi) acres of hilly upland. There is a national school.
