= Kerry County Council =

Local authority of County Kerry in Ireland

Kerry County Council Comhairle Contae Chiarraí
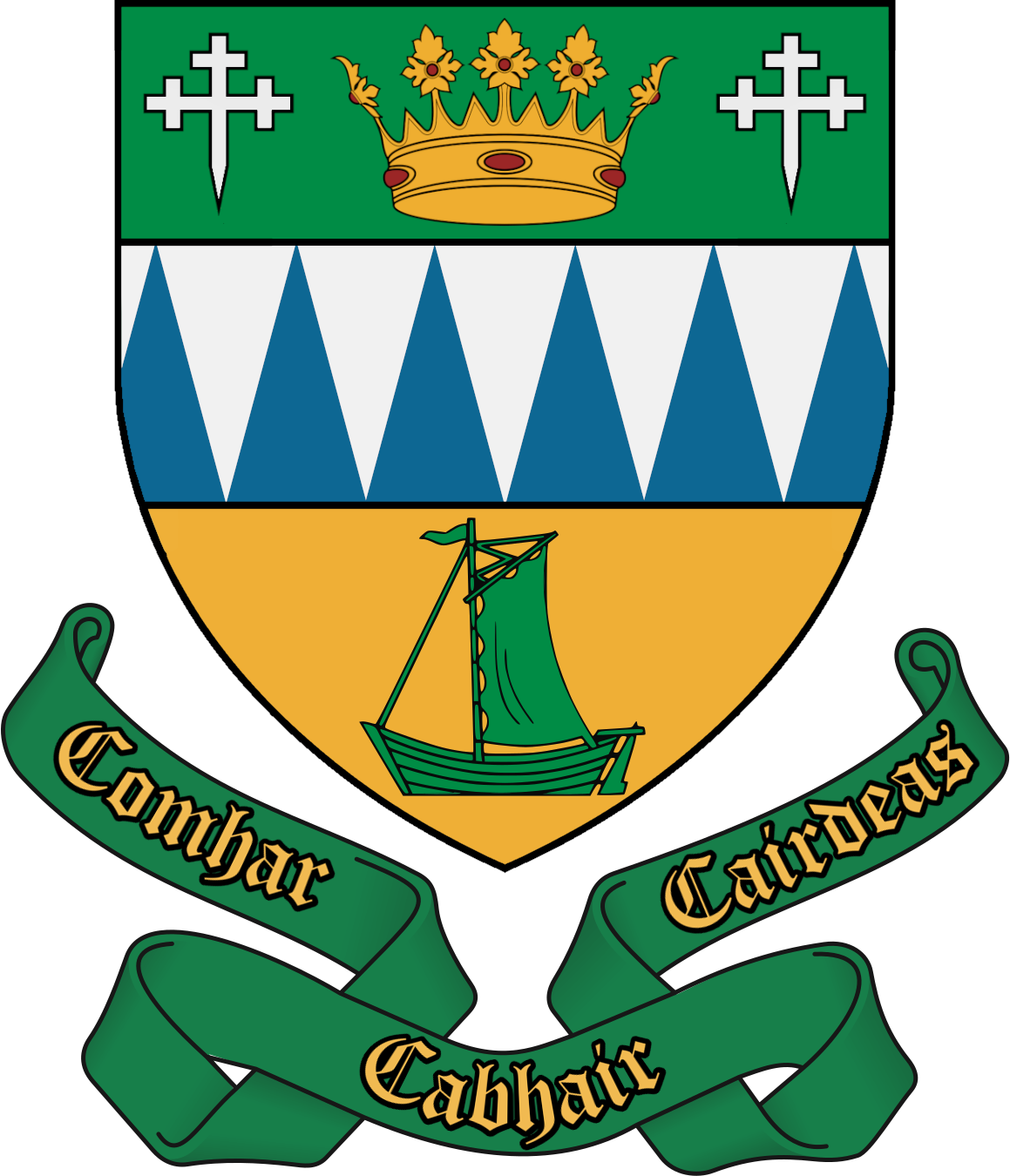

Type
- Type: County council of County Kerry

History
- Founded: 1 April 1899

Leadership
- Cathaoirleach: Mikey Sheehy, FF

Structure
- Seats: 33
- Political groups: Fianna Fáil (9) Fine Gael (6) Sinn Féin (4) Labour (2) Kerry Ind. Alliance (1) Independent (11)

Elections
- Last election: 7 June 2024

Motto
- Comhar, Cabhair, Cairdeas (Irish) "Co-operation, Help, Friendship"

Meeting place
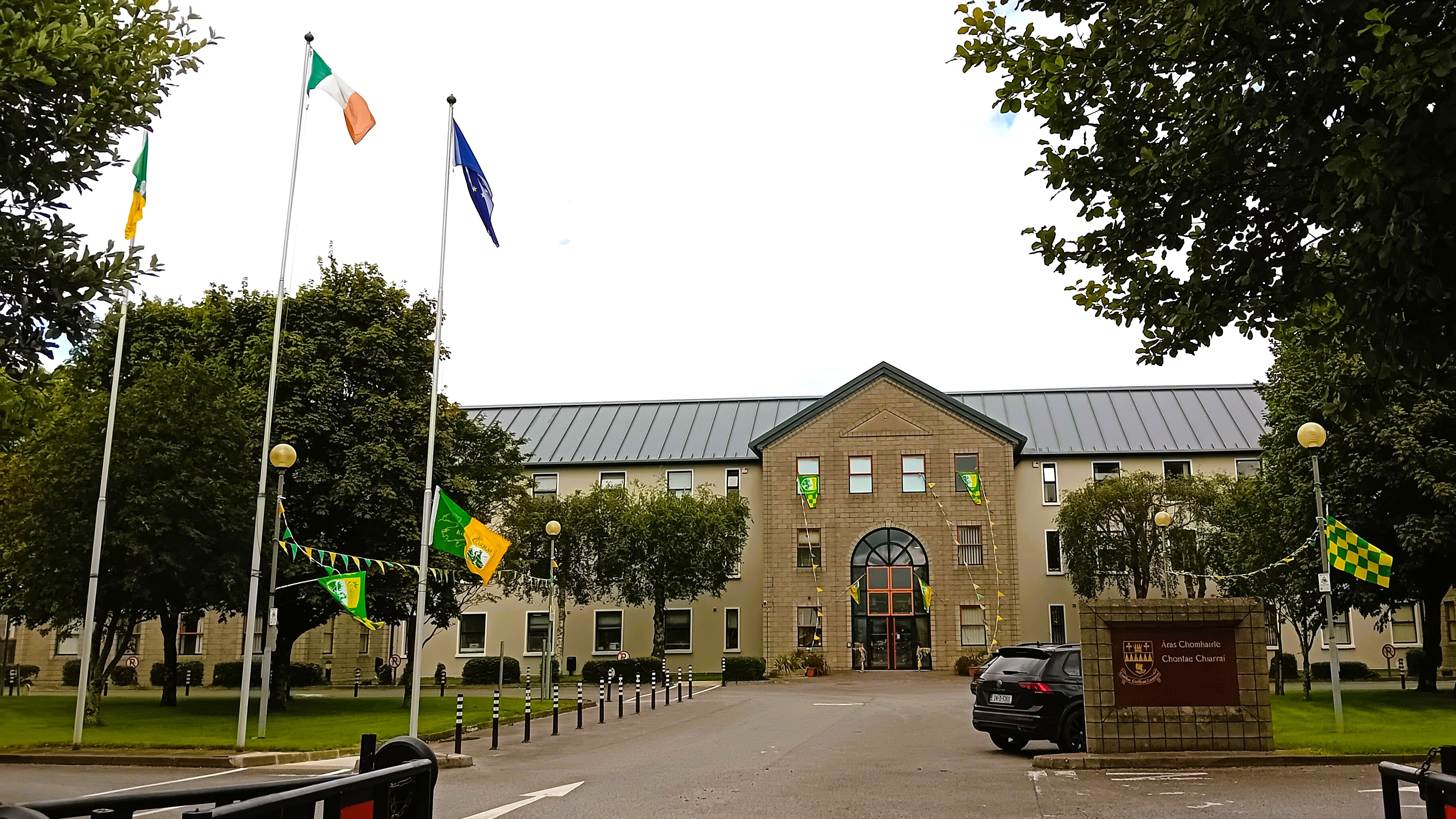
- Áras an Chontae, Rathass, Tralee

Website
- Official website

Kerry County Council (Irish: Comhairle Contae Chiarraí) is the local authority of County Kerry, Ireland. As a county council, it is governed by the Local Government Act 2001. The council is responsible for housing and community, roads and transportation, urban planning and development, amenity and culture, and environment. The council has 33 elected members. Elections are held every five years and are by single transferable vote. The head of the council has the title of Cathaoirleach (chairperson). The council's administration is managed by a chief executive. The council is based at Áras an Chontae (County Buildings) in Tralee.

== History ==
=== 1899 to 1922 ===
Prior to 1899, the primary function of the county was as a judicial area, overseen by the High Sheriff of Kerry. The county had a grand jury, usually comprising the main landowners, appointed by the county's judges. Grand juries gradually took on various administrative functions, such as the maintenance of roads, bridges and asylums. Elected county councils were established in 1899 under the Local Government (Ireland) Act 1898, legislation passed by the Parliament of the United Kingdom, of which Ireland formed a part at that time. The new county council took over the administrative functions of the grand jury. The introduction of county councils to Ireland followed their establishment in England and Wales in 1889 and Scotland in 1890.

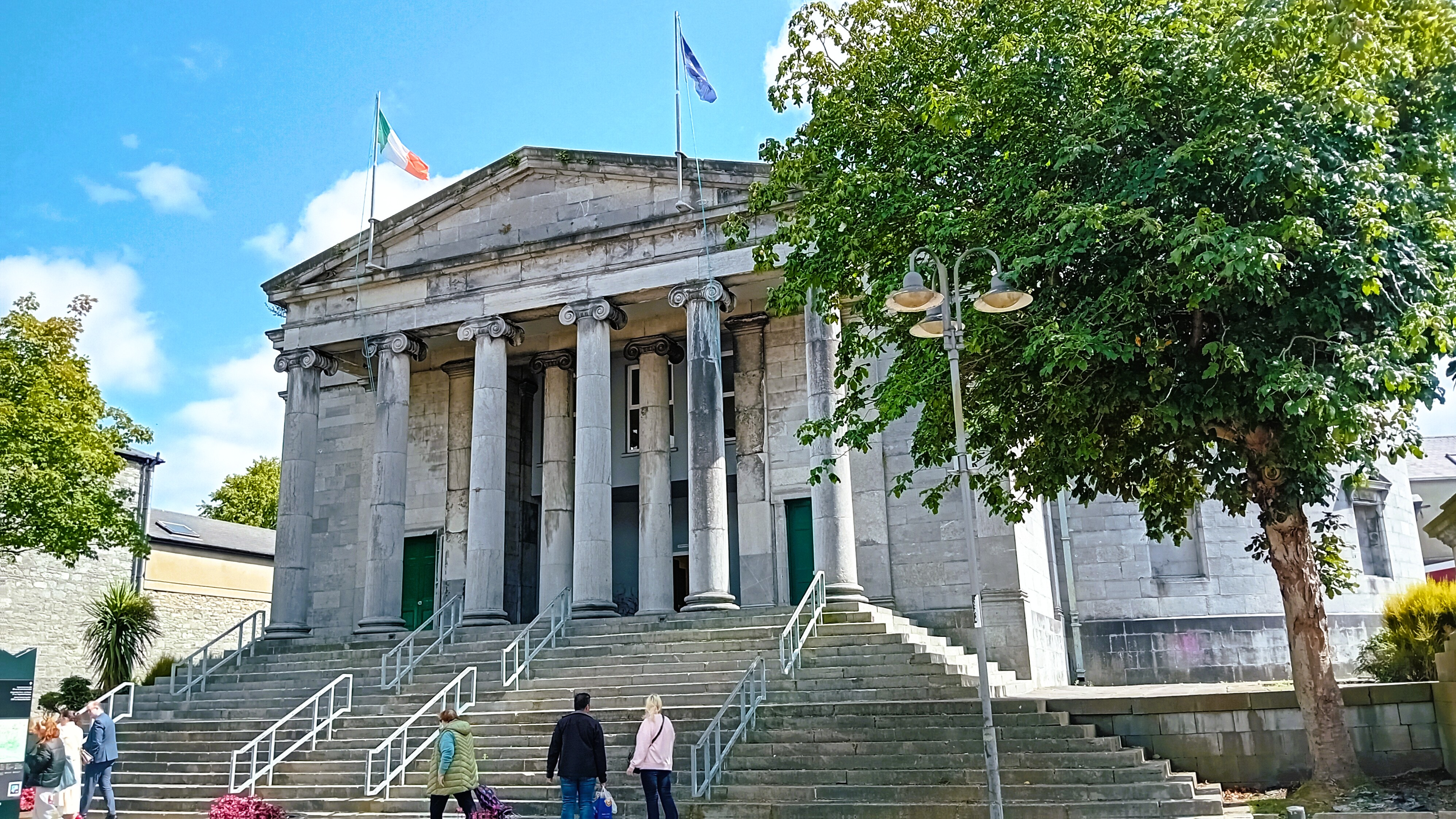
Tralee Courthouse: Council's meeting place 1899–1910

The first election was held on 6 April 1899, and the council first met on 22 April at Tralee Courthouse (built 1830–1835) where the grand jury had also held its meetings. St John Henry Donovan, a nationalist from Tralee, was appointed the first chairman of the council. The first council had 30 members. Of these, 22 were directly elected for single-member county electoral divisions. The remainder of the council consisted of the chairmen of the six rural district councils, who were ex officio members, and an additional two members who were chosen by co-option. Elections of the entire council were held every three years.

The area governed by the council

The method of election was changed to proportional representation under the Local Government (Ireland) Act 1919, with the first elections under the new system held on 2 June 1920. The election took place during the Irish War of Independence, and control of the council was won by Sinn Féin.

=== Post-independence ===
Following the independence of the Irish Free State in 1922, responsibility for local government was taken by the new government.

During the Irish Civil War, the government used its powers to dissolve the council in May 1923, with a commissioner appointed to conduct the business of the council. A new council was elected in May 1926. In September 1930 the council was again dissolved and a commissioner appointed. Following the election of a Fianna Fáil government, the Councillors displaced in 1930 were restored to office in May 1932.

In 1942 the number of Councillors was reduced from 30 to 26. At the same time, the county management system was introduced. The council was again dissolved in May 1945, with elections resuming in October 1948. In 1953 the term of office for councillors was increased from 3 to 5 years, and in 1985 the number of Councillors was increased to 27.

The council is responsible for housing and community, roads and transportation, urban planning and development, amenity and culture, and environment.

== Regional Assembly ==
Kerry County Council has two representatives on the Southern Regional Assembly who are part of the South-West Strategic Planning Area Committee.

== Premises ==
The county council is based at Áras an Chontae (County Buildings) in the Rathass area of Tralee. The building was originally completed in 1842 as the Tralee Union Workhouse. It subsequently served as St Catherine's Hospital between the 1930s and 1984. After the hospital closed, the building was refurbished and converted to become the county council's headquarters, opening as such in 1989.

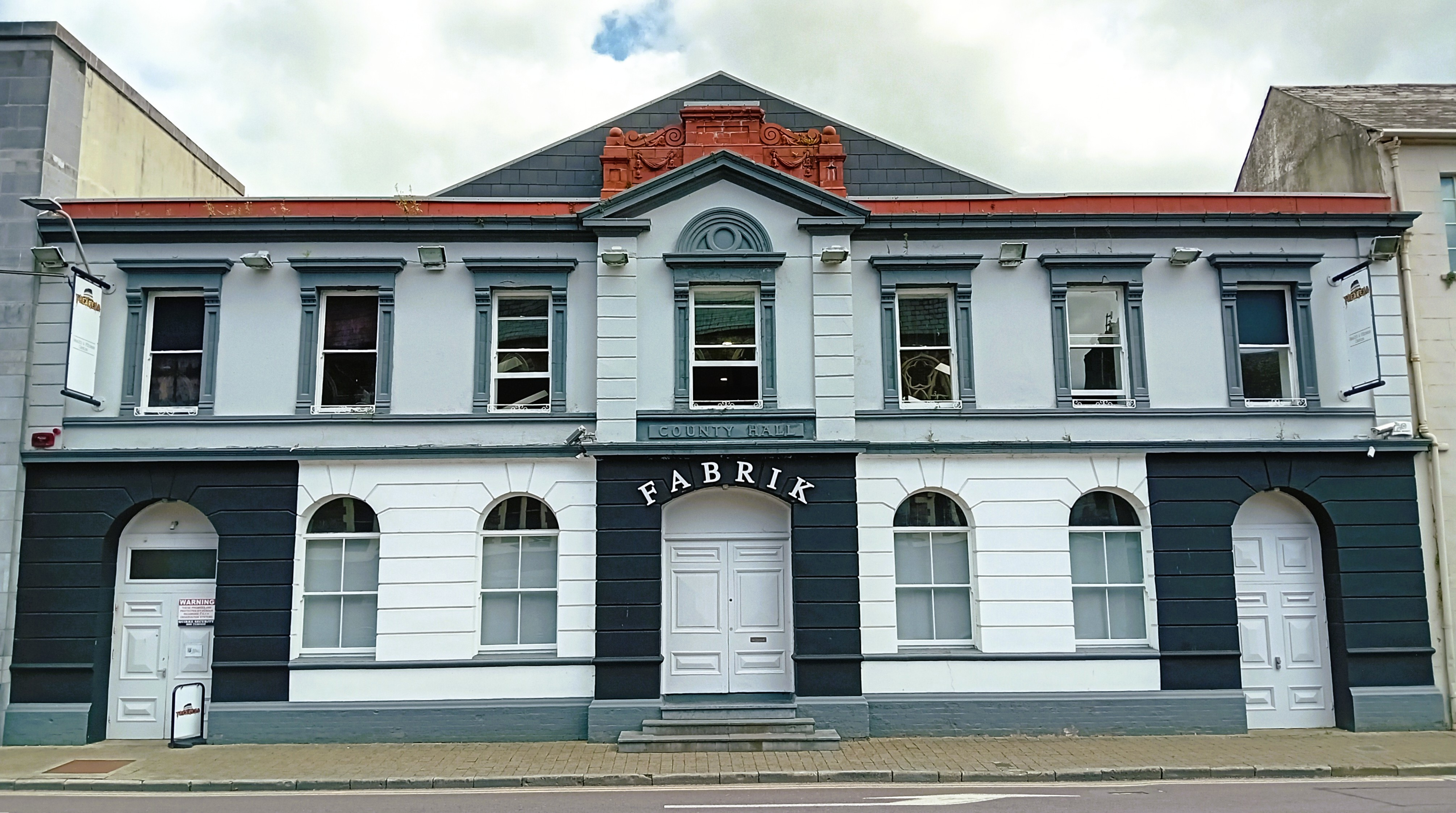
Old County Hall, Godfrey Place: Council's headquarters 1910–1920

From 1899 until 1910 the council met at Tralee Courthouse. In January 1910 the council moved its headquarters to a purpose-built County Hall on Godfrey Place in Tralee, which it shared with Tralee Urban District Council. The building was set on fire by British Black and Tans during the Siege of Tralee of November 1920.

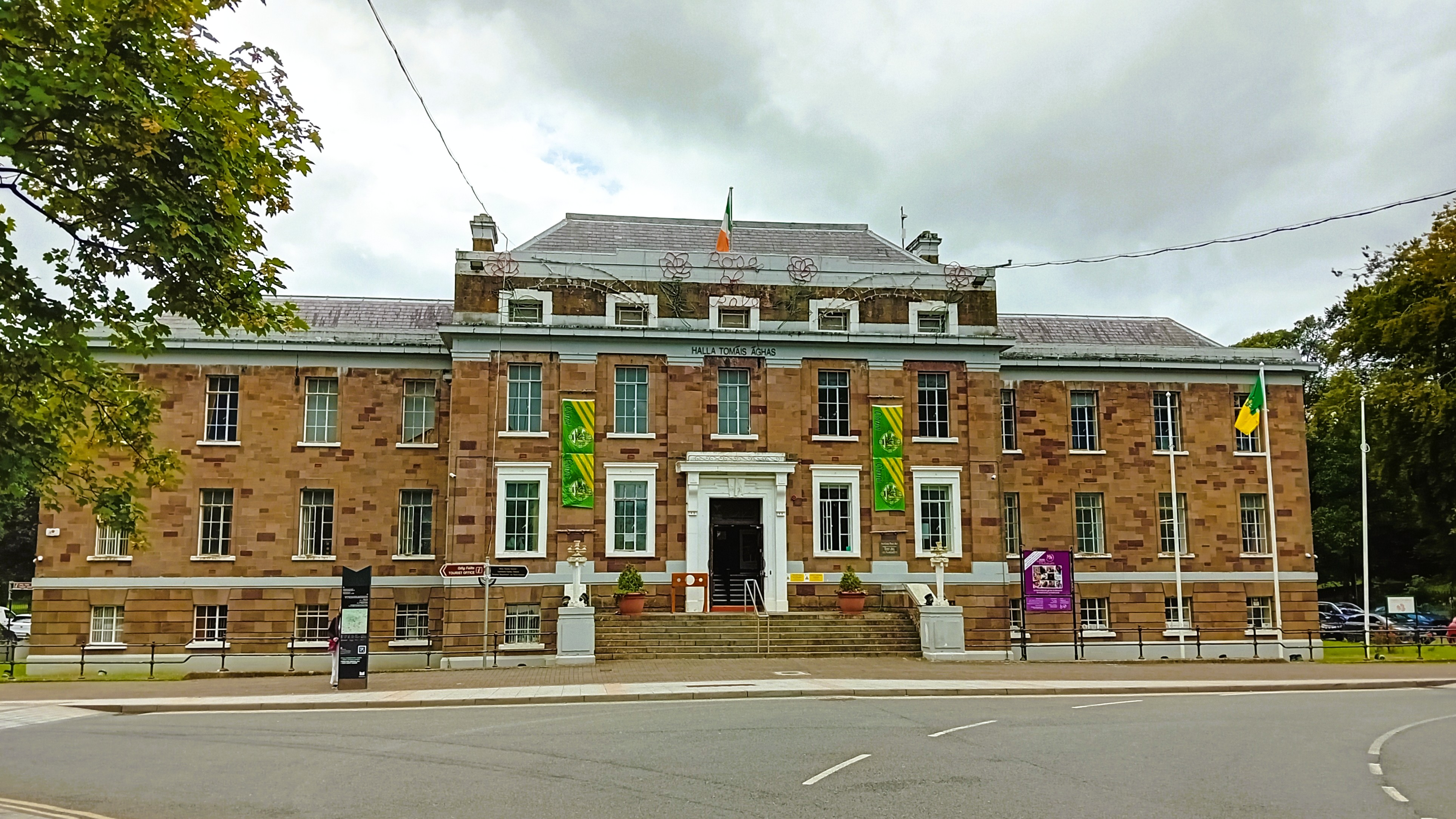
Ashe Memorial Hall, now the Kerry County Museum: Council's headquarters 1928–1989

After the fire, the two councils decided not to return to County Hall, which was instead subsequently repaired to become an entertainment venue. The two councils instead built a new joint headquarters on Denny Street in the centre of Tralee, which was completed in 1928 and named the Ashe Memorial Hall, being dedicated to the memory of the republican Thomas Ashe (1885–1917), who was from County Kerry. The council remained based at the Ashe Memorial Hall until it moved to Áras an Chontae in January 1989.

== Elections ==
Members of Kerry County Council are elected for a five-year term of office on the electoral system of proportional representation by means of the single transferable vote (PR-STV) from multi-member local electoral areas (LEAs).

Year	FF	FG	SF	Lab	KIA	Ind.	Total
2024	9	6	4	2	1	11	33
2019	10	7	4	2	1	9	33
2014	9	9	5	2	1	7	33
2009	7	10	2	4	1	3	27
2004	11	8	2	2	1	3	27
1999	12	6	1	3	1	4	27
1991	13	7	0	4	—N/a	3	27
1985	13	7	0	3	—N/a	4	27
1979	14	7	1	2	—N/a	2	26

== Local electoral areas and municipal districts ==
County Kerry is divided into LEAs and municipal districts, defined by electoral divisions.

Municipal District	LEA	Definition	Seats
Corca Dhuibhne–Castleisland	Corca Dhuibhne	An Baile Dubh (in the former Rural District of Dingle), An Clochán, An Daingean, An Mhin Aird, An Sráidbhaile, Ballinvoher, Ballynacourty, Boolteens, Castlegregory, Cé Bhréanainn, Ceann Trá, Cill Chuáin, Cill Maoilchéadair, Cinn Aird, Deelis, Dún Chaoin, Dún Urlann, Inch, Kilgarrylander, Kilgobban, Kiltallagh, Knockglass, Lack, Márthain, Milltown and Na Gleannta.	3
Corca Dhuibhne–Castleisland	Castleisland	Arabela, Ballyegan (in the former Rural District of Tralee), Brosna, Carker, Castleisland, Coom, Cordal, Crinny, Currans, Derreen, Gneeves, Kilfelim, Killeentierna, Kilmurry, Kilnanare, Kilshenane, Knocknagashel, Lackabaun, Millbrook, Molahiffe, Mount Eagle, Nohaval, OBrennan and Scartaglin.	4
Kenmare		An Baile Breac, An tImleach, Ardea, Baile an Sceilg, Banawn, Caher, Cappagh, Caragh, Castlecove, Castlequin, Cathair Dónall, Ceannúigh, Churchtown, Cloon, Curraghbeg, Curraghmore, Dawros, Doire Fhíonáin, Doire Ianna, Dromin, Dromore, Dunloe, Glanbehy, Glanlee, Glanlough, Glanmore, Greenane, Kenmare, Kilgarvan, Kilgobnet, Killinane, Killorglin, Lickeen, Loch Luíoch, Loughbrin, Máistir Gaoithe, Maum, Na Beathacha, Portmagee, Reen, Sneem, Tahilla, Toghroinn Fhíonáin, Trian Iarthach and Valencia.	6
Killarney		Aghadoe, Aglish, Ballyhar, Brewsterfield, Clydagh, Coolies, Doocarrig, Flesk, Headfort, Kilbonane, Kilcummin, Killarney Rural, Killarney Urban, Knocknahoe, Lahard, Muckross, Rathmore and Rockfield.	7
Listowel		Abbeydorney, Ardagh, Astee, Ballincloher, Ballyconry, Ballyduff (in the former Rural District of Listowel), Ballyegan (in the former Rural District of Listowel), Ballyheige, Ballyhorgan, Ballynorig, Beal, Carrig, Causeway, Cloontubbrid, Drommartin, Duagh, Ennismore, Gullane, Gunsborough, Kerryhead, Kilfeighny, Kilflyn, Killahan, Killehenny, Killury, Kilmeany, Kiltomy, Leitrim, Lislaughtin, Lisselton, Listowel Rural, Listowel Urban, Lixnaw, Moynsha, Newtownsandes, Rathea, Shronowen, Tarbert, Tarmon, Trienearagh and Urlee.	6
Tralee		Ardfert, Ballynahaglish, Ballyseedy, Banna, Baurtregaum, Blennerville, Clogherbrien, Doon, Ratass, Tralee Rural, Tralee Urban and Tubrid.	7

== Councillors ==
The following were elected at the 2024 Kerry County Council election.

=== 2024 seats summary ===
Party	Seats
Fianna Fáil	9
Fine Gael	6
Sinn Féin	4
Labour	2
Kerry Ind. Alliance	1
Independent	11

=== Councillors by electoral area ===
This list reflects the order in which councillors were elected on 7 June 2024.

Council members from 2024 election
Local electoral area	Name	Party
Castleisland	Jackie Healy-Rae	Independent
Castleisland	Charlie Farrelly	Independent
Castleisland	Fionnán Fitzgerald	Fianna Fáil
Castleisland	Bobby O'Connell	Fine Gael
An Daingean	Tommy Griffin	Fine Gael
An Daingean	Robert Brosnan	Sinn Féin
An Daingean	Breandán Fitzgerald	Fianna Fáil
Kenmare	Johnny Healy-Rae	Independent
Kenmare	Michael Cahill (Note: Replaced during term, see table below for details.)	Fianna Fáil
Kenmare	Norma Moriarty	Fianna Fáil
Kenmare	Teddy O'Sullivan Casey	Fine Gael
Kenmare	Podge Foley	Independent
Kenmare	Dan McCarthy	Independent
Killarney	Maura Healy-Rae	Independent
Killarney	Martin Grady	Independent
Killarney	John O'Donoghue	Kerry Ind. Alliance
Killarney	Brendan Cronin	Independent
Killarney	Niall Kelleher	Fianna Fáil
Killarney	Niall O'Callaghan	Independent
Killarney	Marie Moloney	Labour
Listowel	Mike Kennelly	Fine Gael
Listowel	Liam Nolan	Independent
Listowel	Michael Foley	Fine Gael
Listowel	Michael Leane	Fianna Fáil
Listowel	Tom Barry	Sinn Féin
Listowel	Jimmy Moloney	Fianna Fáil
Tralee	Mikey Sheehy	Fianna Fáil
Tralee	Terry O'Brien	Labour
Tralee	Deirdre Ferris	Sinn Féin
Tralee	Sam Locke	Independent
Tralee	Paul Daly	Sinn Féin
Tralee	Anne O'Sullivan	Fianna Fáil
Tralee	Angie Baily	Fine Gael

==== Co-options ====
Party	Outgoing	LEA	Reason	Date	Co-optee
Fianna Fáil	Michael Cahill	Kenmare	Elected to 34th Dáil at the 2024 general election	20 December 2024	Tommy Cahill
Fine Gael	Mike Kennelly	Listowel	Elected to the 27th Seanad at the 2025 Seanad election	January 2025	Aoife Kennelly
