= Mike Kennelly =

Irish politician

Senator Mike Kennelly
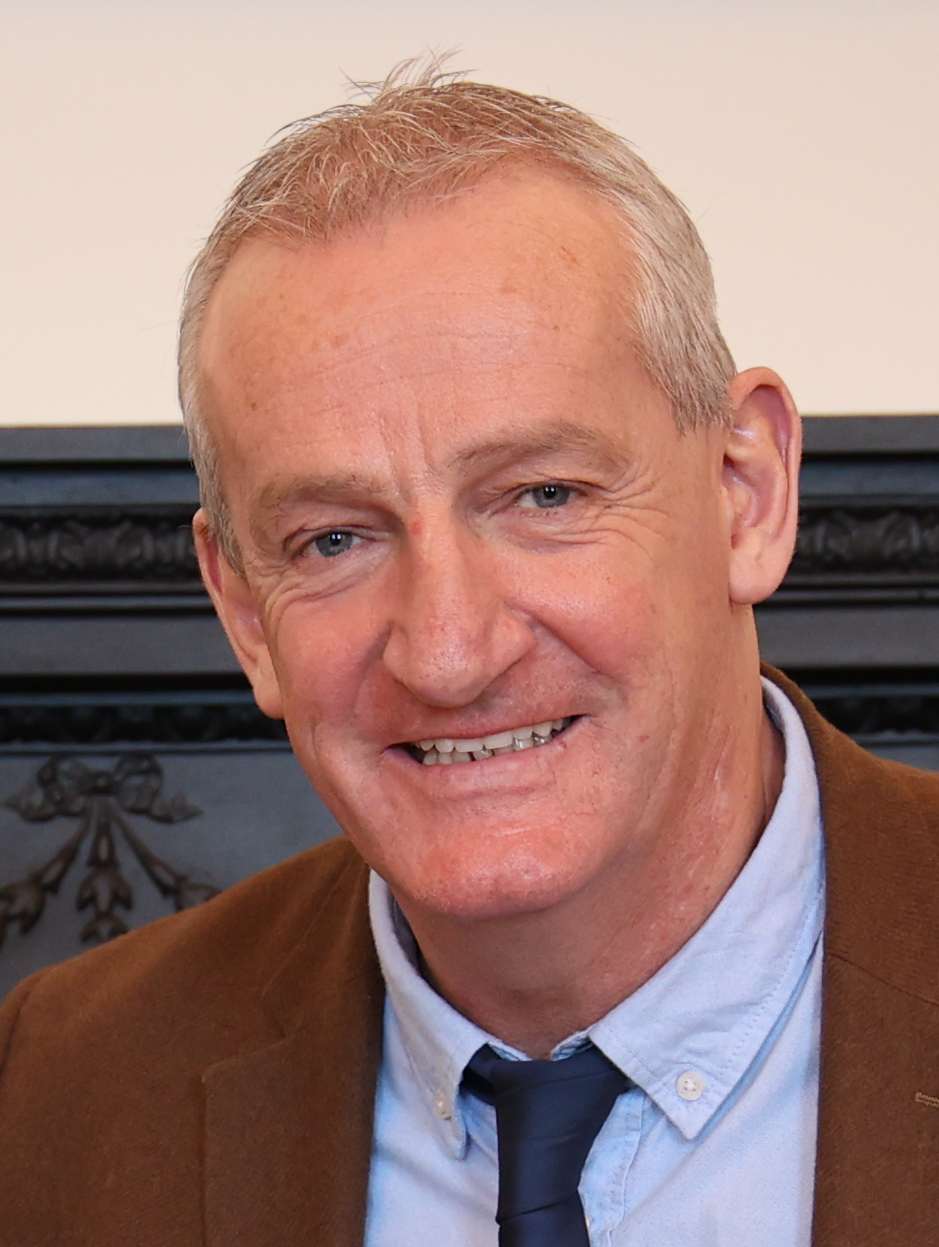
- Kennelly in 2025

Senator
- Incumbent
- Assumed office January 2025
- Constituency: Labour Panel

Personal details
- Born: County Kerry, Ireland
- Party: Fine Gael

Mike Kennelly is an Irish Fine Gael politician who has been a senator for the Labour Panel since January 2025.

He was a member of Kerry County Council for the Listowel area from May 2014 to January 2025. He was an unsuccessful candidate for the Kerry constituency at the 2020 general election.

He is the younger brother of Gaelic footballer Tim Kennelly.
