= Siege of Tralee =

Curfew imposed by the Black and Tans on Tralee, County Kerry in 1920

- Part of the Irish War of Independence
Date	1 – 9 November 1920
Location	Tralee, County Kerry
Result	Irish withdrawal: Siege lifted

Belligerents
Irish Republican Army	United Kingdom

Commanders and leaders
Patrick Cahill	(United Kingdom of Great Britain and Ireland) Constable Patrick Waters †

Units involved
Kerry No. 1 Brigade (IRA): Tralee Battalion	Royal Irish Constabulary: Black and Tans

The siege of Tralee was an event that took place between 1 and 9 November 1920 in Tralee, County Kerry, Ireland.

== History ==
Patrick Cahill, the Officer Commanding Kerry No. 1 Brigade, Irish Republican Army instructed the Tralee Battalion to carry out reprisal attacks for the death (on hunger strike) of Sinn Féin Lord Mayor of Cork Terence MacSwiney. On the night of 31 October 1920, Royal Irish Constabulary (RIC) Constable Patrick Waters and RIC Constable Ernest Bright had been kidnapped, shot and killed by IRA volunteers in Tralee. In response to the seizure of two of their colleagues and in an attempt to recover the bodies, British Black and Tans imposed a curfew on the town, shot local people who appeared on the streets, insisted that the local businesses close and stopped all food and drink from entering the town. Tralee Town Hall and several shops were burned down and two civilians were shot dead (John Conway and Tommy Wall).

Hamar Greenwood, the Chief Secretary for Ireland, ordered that the siege be lifted on 9 November 1920.
