= Dan Kiely =

Irish politician (born 1940)

Senator
- In office 25 April 1987 – 12 September 2002
- In office 8 October 1981 – 13 May 1982
- Constituency: Labour Panel

Personal details
- Born: 10 May 1940 (age 86) County Kerry, Ireland
- Party: Fianna Fáil

Daniel Kiely (born 10 May 1940) is an auctioneer and former Irish Fianna Fáil politician and senator. He served on Kerry County Council from the 1980s through to the 2000s.

Born in Tarbert, County Kerry, Kiely was elected in 1981 to the 15th Seanad, on the Labour Panel. At the February 1982 general election, he stood unsuccessfully for Dáil Éireann in the Kerry North constituency. This was the first of three successive defeats in Dáil elections: he also contested both the November 1982 and 1981 general elections without winning a seat.

Kiely did not contest the 1982 Seanad election, and failed to regain his seat when he stood again at the 1983 election. He was re-elected at the 1987 election to the 18th Seanad. He held the seat until he was defeated at the 2002 election.

He was also a member of Kerry County Council for the Listowel electoral area, but was defeated at the 2004 local elections. He was co-opted to the council in 2007 to replace Ned O'Sullivan who was elected to Seanad Éireann. Kiely was not re-elected to Kerry County Council at the 2009 local elections.

At the 2014 Kerry County Council election Kiely took a case to the Supreme Court for errors made in the election count. The court ordered a full recount for the first time in the history of the Irish State. However, after the recount, Kiely was still four votes behind and was not elected. He subsequently retired from politics.
