= Michael Cahill (Irish politician) =

Irish politician

Michael Cahill TD
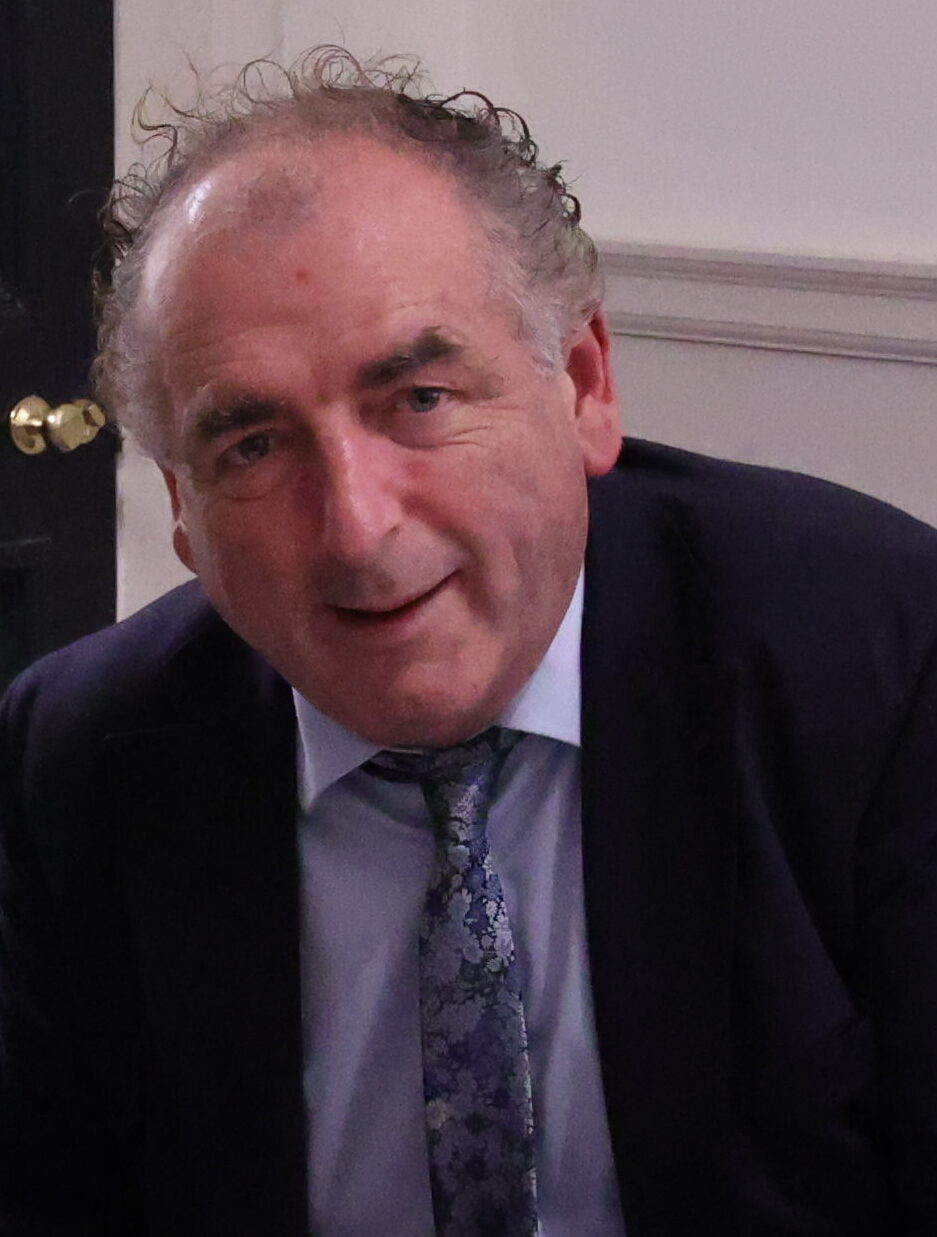
- Cahill in 2024

Teachta Dála
- Incumbent
- Assumed office November 2024
- Constituency: Kerry

Personal details
- Born: 1965/1966 (age 59–60) County Kerry, Ireland
- Party: Fianna Fáil (before 2011, since 2016)
- Other political affiliations: Independent (2011–2016)
- Spouse: Brenda Cahill
- Children: 4

Michael Cahill (born 1965/1966) is an Irish Fianna Fáil politician who has been a Teachta Dála (TD) for the Kerry constituency since the 2024 general election.

== Biography ==
Cahill is from Rossbeigh on the Atlantic Ocean coast.

He was a long serving councillor on Kerry County Council. He was a member of the council from 1991 to 2024 for the Killorglin and Kenmare areas. His father, Tom Cahill, was also a Fianna Fáil councillor.

He left Fianna Fáil in January 2011 and canvassed for Tom Fleming, who also left the party. Fleming was elected as an independent TD, with Cahill acting as his parliamentary secretary for a while. Cahill re-joined Fianna Fáil in 2016. In the 2024 Kerry County Council election he was re-elected to Kerry County Council. Later that year he was also elected to Dáil Éireann in the general election on the final count without reaching the quota. His son, Tommy, a primary school teacher, was co-opted to the vacated council seat in December 2024, becoming the third generation of the family to serve on the council.

In January 2026, Cahill was convicted of dangerous driving for driving at speeds in excess of 190 km/h (120 mph) on the M8 motorway. He was fined €500 and disqualified from driving for two years. Following his conviction, Cahill resigned his position as a member of the Joint Oireachtas Committee on Justice, Home Affairs and Migration. It later emerged that in 1993 he had been found liable by a court for causing a crash that left a young girl with "difficulty learning to walk".

Dáil	Election	Deputy (Party)	Deputy (Party)	Deputy (Party)	Deputy (Party)	Deputy (Party)	Deputy (Party)	Deputy (Party)
4th	1923	Tom McEllistrim (Rep)	Austin Stack (Rep)	Patrick Cahill (Rep)	Thomas O'Donoghue (Rep)	James Crowley (CnaG)	Fionán Lynch (CnaG)	John O'Sullivan (CnaG)
5th	1927 (Jun)	Tom McEllistrim (FF)	Austin Stack (SF)	William O'Leary (FF)	Thomas O'Reilly (FF)	James Crowley (CnaG)	Fionán Lynch (CnaG)	John O'Sullivan (CnaG)
6th	1927 (Sep)	Tom McEllistrim (FF)	Frederick Crowley (FF)	William O'Leary (FF)	Thomas O'Reilly (FF)	James Crowley (CnaG)	Fionán Lynch (CnaG)	John O'Sullivan (CnaG)
7th	1932	Tom McEllistrim (FF)	Frederick Crowley (FF)	John Flynn (FF)	Thomas O'Reilly (FF)	Eamon Kissane (FF)	Fionán Lynch (CnaG)	John O'Sullivan (CnaG)
8th	1933	Tom McEllistrim (FF)	Frederick Crowley (FF)	John Flynn (FF)	Denis Daly (FF)	Eamon Kissane (FF)	Fionán Lynch (CnaG)	John O'Sullivan (CnaG)
9th	1937	Constituency abolished. See Kerry North and Kerry South						

Dáil	Election	Deputy (Party)	Deputy (Party)	Deputy (Party)	Deputy (Party)	Deputy (Party)
32nd	2016	Martin Ferris (SF)	Michael Healy-Rae (Ind.)	Danny Healy-Rae (Ind.)	John Brassil (FF)	Brendan Griffin (FG)
33rd	2020	Pa Daly (SF)	Michael Healy-Rae (Ind.)	Danny Healy-Rae (Ind.)	Norma Foley (FF)	Brendan Griffin (FG)
34th	2024	Pa Daly (SF)	Michael Healy-Rae (Ind.)	Danny Healy-Rae (Ind.)	Norma Foley (FF)	Michael Cahill (FF)
