= Thomas O'Reilly =

Thomas O'Reilly may refer to:

- Tom O'Reilly (Fermanagh politician) (fl.1990s–2000s), Irish politician in Fermanagh and South Tyrone
- Tom O'Reilly (Cavan politician) (1915–1995), Gaelic football player from Cavan and independent TD 1944–1948
- Thomas O'Reilly (Kerry politician) (died 1944), member of the Dáil, 1927–1933
- Thomas O'Reilly (Newfoundland politician) (c. 1839–1897), politician and magistrate in Newfoundland
- Thomas O'Reilly (clergyman) (1819–1881), Isle of Man born Anglican minister, active in Australia from the 1840s
- Tom O'Reilly (rugby league) (born 1974), Papua New Guinea rugby league international
- Thomas Charles O'Reilly (1873–1938), American bishop
