= East Kerry =

East Kerry may refer to:

- East Kerry GAA, board of the Gaelic Athletic Association
- East Kerry (UK Parliament constituency)
