= Eugene O'Sullivan =

Eugene O'Sullivan may refer to:

- Eugene D. O'Sullivan (1883–1968), American Democratic Party politician from Nebraska
- Eugene O'Sullivan (Irish politician) (1879–1942), Irish nationalist politician and farmer
- Eugene O'Sullivan (1892–1971), English music hall performer, stage and screen actor, and director, better known as Gene Gerrard.
