= John M. O'Sullivan =

Irish politician (1881–1948)

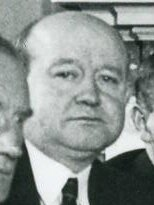
- O'Sullivan in 1928

Minister for Education
- In office 28 January 1926 – 9 March 1932
- Preceded by: Eoin MacNeill
- Succeeded by: Thomas Derrig

Parliamentary Secretary
- 1924–1926: Finance

Teachta Dála
- In office July 1937 – June 1943
- Constituency: Kerry North
- In office August 1923 – July 1937
- Constituency: Kerry

Personal details
- Born: 18 February 1881 Killarney, County Kerry, Ireland
- Died: 9 February 1948 (aged 66) Dublin, Ireland
- Party: Fine Gael; Cumann na nGaedheal
- Spouse: Agnes Crotty
- Children: 4
- Education: University College Dublin; University of Bonn; Heidelberg University

John Marcus O'Sullivan (18 February 1881 – 9 February 1948) was an Irish Fine Gael politician who served as Minister for Education from 1926 to 1932 and Parliamentary Secretary to the Minister for Finance from 1924 to 1926. He served as a Teachta Dála (TD) from 1923 to 1943.

O'Sullivan was born in Killarney, County Kerry, in 1881, the second son of M. O'Sullivan, a merchant. He was educated at St Brendan's College, Killarney, Clongowes Wood College, and later at University College Dublin (UCD), University of Bonn and Heidelberg University, where he was awarded a PhD. He was appointed to the Chair of Modern History at UCD in 1910. One of his most students was Robert Dudley Edwards who was appointed as Professor of Modern Irish History in 1944, and who is widely regarded as the father of archives in Ireland. Dudley Edwards kept a picture of O'Sullivan on the wall of his home for several years.

He was first elected to Dáil Éireann in 1923 as a Cumann na nGaedheal TD for the Kerry North constituency. He served as Parliamentary Secretary to the Minister for Finance from 1924 to 1926. He was appointed to the Cabinet in 1926, serving under W. T. Cosgrave as Minister for Education. In 1926, a report from the Second National Programme Conference was presented to him as the Minister for Education. He accepted all proposals stated in the report to be recommended as a national curriculum. His major ministerial achievement was the Vocational Education Act 1930. He served on the Irish delegation to the League of Nations, in 1924 and from 1928 to 1930. He was re-elected at every election until 1943 when he lost his Dáil seat. He subsequently retired from politics.

He was married to Agnes Crotty, and they had 4 children, two sons and two daughters. O'Sullivan died on 9 February 1948, at his home in Rathgar, Dublin.

Political offices
New office	Parliamentary Secretary to the Minister for Finance; 1924–1926	Succeeded by Eamonn Duggan
Preceded by Eoin MacNeill	Minister for Education; 1926–1932	Succeeded by Thomas Derrig

Dáil	Election	Deputy (Party)	Deputy (Party)	Deputy (Party)	Deputy (Party)	Deputy (Party)	Deputy (Party)	Deputy (Party)
4th	1923	Tom McEllistrim (Rep)	Austin Stack (Rep)	Patrick Cahill (Rep)	Thomas O'Donoghue (Rep)	James Crowley (CnaG)	Fionán Lynch (CnaG)	John O'Sullivan (CnaG)
5th	1927 (Jun)	Tom McEllistrim (FF)	Austin Stack (SF)	William O'Leary (FF)	Thomas O'Reilly (FF)	James Crowley (CnaG)	Fionán Lynch (CnaG)	John O'Sullivan (CnaG)
6th	1927 (Sep)	Tom McEllistrim (FF)	Frederick Crowley (FF)	William O'Leary (FF)	Thomas O'Reilly (FF)	James Crowley (CnaG)	Fionán Lynch (CnaG)	John O'Sullivan (CnaG)
7th	1932	Tom McEllistrim (FF)	Frederick Crowley (FF)	John Flynn (FF)	Thomas O'Reilly (FF)	Eamon Kissane (FF)	Fionán Lynch (CnaG)	John O'Sullivan (CnaG)
8th	1933	Tom McEllistrim (FF)	Frederick Crowley (FF)	John Flynn (FF)	Denis Daly (FF)	Eamon Kissane (FF)	Fionán Lynch (CnaG)	John O'Sullivan (CnaG)
9th	1937	Constituency abolished. See Kerry North and Kerry South						

Dáil	Election	Deputy (Party)	Deputy (Party)	Deputy (Party)	Deputy (Party)	Deputy (Party)
32nd	2016	Martin Ferris (SF)	Michael Healy-Rae (Ind.)	Danny Healy-Rae (Ind.)	John Brassil (FF)	Brendan Griffin (FG)
33rd	2020	Pa Daly (SF)	Michael Healy-Rae (Ind.)	Danny Healy-Rae (Ind.)	Norma Foley (FF)	Brendan Griffin (FG)
34th	2024	Pa Daly (SF)	Michael Healy-Rae (Ind.)	Danny Healy-Rae (Ind.)	Norma Foley (FF)	Michael Cahill (FF)

Dáil	Election	Deputy (Party)	Deputy (Party)	Deputy (Party)	Deputy (Party)
9th	1937	Stephen Fuller (FF)	Tom McEllistrim, Snr (FF)	John O'Sullivan (FG)	Eamon Kissane (FF)
10th	1938	Stephen Fuller (FF)	Tom McEllistrim, Snr (FF)	John O'Sullivan (FG)	Eamon Kissane (FF)
11th	1943	Dan Spring (Lab)	Tom McEllistrim, Snr (FF)	Patrick Finucane (CnaT)	Eamon Kissane (FF)
12th	1944	Dan Spring (NLP)	Tom McEllistrim, Snr (FF)	Patrick Finucane (CnaT)	Eamon Kissane (FF)
13th	1948	Dan Spring (NLP)	Tom McEllistrim, Snr (FF)	Patrick Finucane (CnaT)	Eamon Kissane (FF)
14th	1951	Dan Spring (Lab)	Tom McEllistrim, Snr (FF)	Patrick Finucane (Ind.)	John Lynch (FG)
15th	1954	Dan Spring (Lab)	Tom McEllistrim, Snr (FF)	Patrick Finucane (CnaT)	Johnny Connor (CnaP)
15th	1956 by-election	Dan Spring (Lab)	Tom McEllistrim, Snr (FF)	Patrick Finucane (CnaT)	Kathleen O'Connor (CnaP)
16th	1957	Dan Spring (Lab)	Tom McEllistrim, Snr (FF)	Patrick Finucane (Ind.)	Daniel Moloney (FF)
17th	1961	Dan Spring (Lab)	Tom McEllistrim, Snr (FF)	Patrick Finucane (Ind.)	3 seats from 1961
18th	1965	Dan Spring (Lab)	Tom McEllistrim, Snr (FF)	Patrick Finucane (Ind.)	3 seats from 1961
19th	1969	Dan Spring (Lab)	Gerard Lynch (FG)	Tom McEllistrim, Jnr (FF)	3 seats from 1961
20th	1973	Dan Spring (Lab)	Gerard Lynch (FG)	Tom McEllistrim, Jnr (FF)	3 seats from 1961
21st	1977	Dan Spring (Lab)	Kit Ahern (FF)	Tom McEllistrim, Jnr (FF)	3 seats from 1961
22nd	1981	Dick Spring (Lab)	Denis Foley (FF)	Tom McEllistrim, Jnr (FF)	3 seats from 1961
23rd	1982 (Feb)	Dick Spring (Lab)	Denis Foley (FF)	Tom McEllistrim, Jnr (FF)	3 seats from 1961
24th	1982 (Nov)	Dick Spring (Lab)	Denis Foley (FF)	Tom McEllistrim, Jnr (FF)	3 seats from 1961
25th	1987	Dick Spring (Lab)	Denis Foley (FF)	Jimmy Deenihan (FG)	3 seats from 1961
26th	1989	Dick Spring (Lab)	Tom McEllistrim, Jnr (FF)	Jimmy Deenihan (FG)	3 seats from 1961
27th	1992	Dick Spring (Lab)	Denis Foley (FF)	Jimmy Deenihan (FG)	3 seats from 1961
28th	1997	Dick Spring (Lab)	Denis Foley (FF)	Jimmy Deenihan (FG)	3 seats from 1961
29th	2002	Martin Ferris (SF)	Tom McEllistrim (FF)	Jimmy Deenihan (FG)	3 seats from 1961
30th	2007	Martin Ferris (SF)	Tom McEllistrim (FF)	Jimmy Deenihan (FG)	3 seats from 1961
31st	2011	Constituency abolished. See Kerry North–West Limerick			
