= Patrick Cahill (Sinn Féin politician) =

Irish politician and newspaper editor (1884–1946)

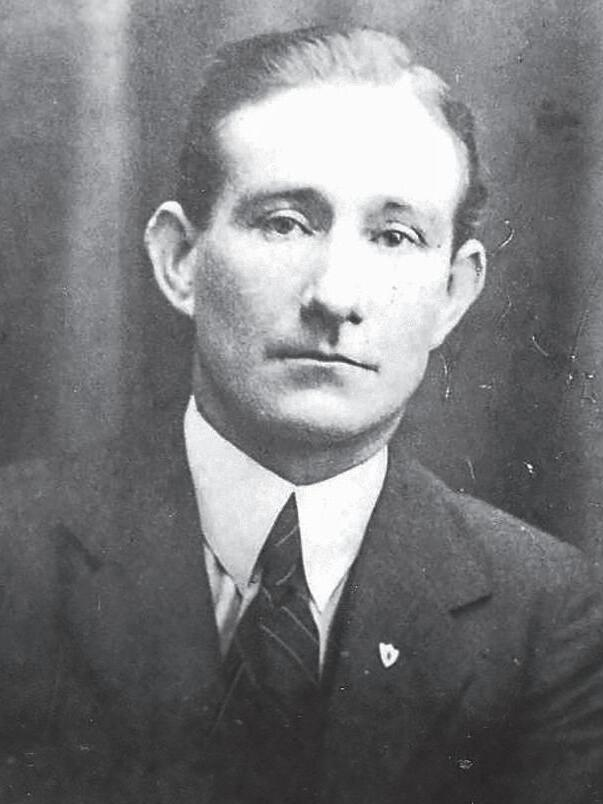
- Cahill, c. 1920s

Teachta Dála
- In office August 1923 – June 1927
- Constituency: Kerry
- In office May 1921 – August 1923
- Constituency: Kerry–Limerick West

Personal details
- Born: 11 September 1884 Tralee, County Kerry, Ireland
- Died: 12 November 1946 (aged 62) County Kerry, Ireland
- Party: Sinn Féin
- Education: Blackrock College

Patrick Joseph Cahill (11 September 1884 – 12 November 1946) was an Irish Sinn Féin politician and newspaper editor.

== Early life ==
He was born in Caherina, Tralee, County Kerry, to Timothy Cahill of Glenbeigh, and Mary Cahill (née Tangney) of Killorglin. He was educated at CBS Tralee and Blackrock College, Dublin, where he began a lifelong friendship with Éamon de Valera.

He played with the Kerry team which defeated Dublin in the 1904 All-Ireland Final, and in the Kerry team which lost to Kildare in the 1905 Final.

== Irish Volunteers ==
In 1914 he joined the Tralee company of the Irish Volunteers. He was involved in the attempt to land arms from the Aud in April 1916, he was arrested after the Easter Rising and interned at various prisons until the general release of December 1916. He was rearrested in September 1917, and not released until February 1919.

He was leader of the Kerry 1st Brigade of the Irish Republican Army. His units operated in and around Tralee during the Irish War of Independence.

== Politics ==
Due mainly to his status in the Volunteers, he was chosen to run unopposed as a Sinn Féin Teachta Dála (TD) to the Second Dáil at the 1921 elections for the Kerry–Limerick West constituency.

He opposed the Anglo-Irish Treaty and voted against it. He was re-elected unopposed as an anti-Treaty Sinn Féin TD to the 3rd Dáil at the 1922 general election though he did not take his seat. During the Irish Civil War, he was a member of anti-treaty forces, and took part in the defence of Tralee and later assumed command of a Dingle column. He was arrested and interned, and went on a forty-two-day hunger strike. He was elected as a Sinn Féin TD at the 1923 general election for the Kerry constituency. He did not stand in the June 1927 general election.

== Later life ==
In 1928, he became founding editor and managing director of the Kerry Champion. He never married and died on 12 November 1946 at the Bon Secour Nursing Home, Tralee.

Sporting positions
Preceded by Dick Fitzgerald	Kerry Senior Football Captain; 1912	Succeeded by Dick Fitzgerald

Dáil	Election	Deputy (Party)	Deputy (Party)	Deputy (Party)	Deputy (Party)	Deputy (Party)	Deputy (Party)	Deputy (Party)	Deputy (Party)
2nd	1921	Piaras Béaslaí (SF)	James Crowley (SF)	Fionán Lynch (SF)	Patrick Cahill (SF)	Con Collins (SF)	Thomas O'Donoghue (SF)	Edmund Roche (SF)	Austin Stack (SF)
3rd	1922	Piaras Béaslaí (PT-SF)	James Crowley (PT-SF)	Fionán Lynch (PT-SF)	Patrick Cahill (AT-SF)	Con Collins (AT-SF)	Thomas O'Donoghue (AT-SF)	Edmund Roche (AT-SF)	Austin Stack (AT-SF)
4th	1923	Constituency abolished. See Kerry and Limerick							

Dáil	Election	Deputy (Party)	Deputy (Party)	Deputy (Party)	Deputy (Party)	Deputy (Party)	Deputy (Party)	Deputy (Party)
4th	1923	Tom McEllistrim (Rep)	Austin Stack (Rep)	Patrick Cahill (Rep)	Thomas O'Donoghue (Rep)	James Crowley (CnaG)	Fionán Lynch (CnaG)	John O'Sullivan (CnaG)
5th	1927 (Jun)	Tom McEllistrim (FF)	Austin Stack (SF)	William O'Leary (FF)	Thomas O'Reilly (FF)	James Crowley (CnaG)	Fionán Lynch (CnaG)	John O'Sullivan (CnaG)
6th	1927 (Sep)	Tom McEllistrim (FF)	Frederick Crowley (FF)	William O'Leary (FF)	Thomas O'Reilly (FF)	James Crowley (CnaG)	Fionán Lynch (CnaG)	John O'Sullivan (CnaG)
7th	1932	Tom McEllistrim (FF)	Frederick Crowley (FF)	John Flynn (FF)	Thomas O'Reilly (FF)	Eamon Kissane (FF)	Fionán Lynch (CnaG)	John O'Sullivan (CnaG)
8th	1933	Tom McEllistrim (FF)	Frederick Crowley (FF)	John Flynn (FF)	Denis Daly (FF)	Eamon Kissane (FF)	Fionán Lynch (CnaG)	John O'Sullivan (CnaG)
9th	1937	Constituency abolished. See Kerry North and Kerry South						

Dáil	Election	Deputy (Party)	Deputy (Party)	Deputy (Party)	Deputy (Party)	Deputy (Party)
32nd	2016	Martin Ferris (SF)	Michael Healy-Rae (Ind.)	Danny Healy-Rae (Ind.)	John Brassil (FF)	Brendan Griffin (FG)
33rd	2020	Pa Daly (SF)	Michael Healy-Rae (Ind.)	Danny Healy-Rae (Ind.)	Norma Foley (FF)	Brendan Griffin (FG)
34th	2024	Pa Daly (SF)	Michael Healy-Rae (Ind.)	Danny Healy-Rae (Ind.)	Norma Foley (FF)	Michael Cahill (FF)
