= Kate Breen =

Irish republican activist and nationalist

- Born: Kate Breen; 13 December 1869; Kilarney, County Kerry
- Died: 27 December 1937 (aged 68); Tralee, County Kerry

Kate Breen (13 December 1869 – 27 December 1937) was an Irish republican activist and nationalist.

== Biography ==
=== Early life ===
She was born Kate Breen to John Breen, an official of the Killarney Urban Council, and Mary Scannell. She had ten brothers and at least two sisters. Three of her brothers became priests, one was Canon Breen, former president of St Brendan's College, Killarney, another a leading republican, Rev. Joseph Breen, and one a World War I chaplain Rev Frank Breen. A fourth brother was a teacher in St. Michael’s College, Listowel while her sisters Agnes and Ellen were teachers in the Killarney district.

=== Nationalism ===
Breen was involved in the 1916 Easter Rising as well as during the Irish War of Independence. She was a member of Cumann na mBan and of its executive leadership, representing the Munster branches. She took a prominent part in the fight for freedom and was interned in Cork Jail. Breen was also arrested during events leading up to the elections in 1918. Breen was one of the women who voted against acceptance of the articles of the treaty. On the signing of the Anglo-Irish Treaty she remained a believer in the idea of a full Republic, and was interned in Kilmainham Gaol during the Civil War.

=== Later life ===
After the war, Breen held a number of offices as a local politician. At the June 1927 general election, Breen was an independent candidate in the Kerry constituency, but she took only 1.8% of the first-preference votes, and did not win a seat. She was elected as a Councillor in 1926 and held her seat until 1937 as part of the Fianna Fáil party, despite changing districts on more than one occasion. Breen was chair of the Kerry Board of Assistance and Health and well as on the Prices Commission and a member of Kerry Agricultural Committee. Breen was also Vice-Chairman of the General Council of County Councils. Breen died of heart failure on 27 December 1937.
