= William O'Leary (Irish politician) =

Irish politician (1894–1955)

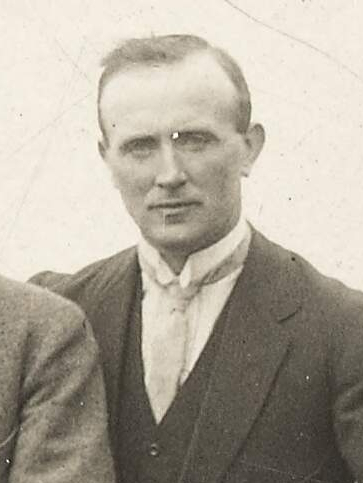
- O'Leary in 1927

Teachta Dála
- In office June 1927 – February 1932
- Constituency: Kerry

Personal details
- Born: 4 October 1894 Ardfert, County Kerry, Ireland
- Died: 27 November 1955 (aged 61) Rathmines, Dublin, Ireland
- Party: Fianna Fáil

William O'Leary (4 October 1894 – 27 November 1955) was an Irish Fianna Fáil politician.

The son of a farmer from Snipefield, Ardfert, County Kerry. He became a farmer and vintner at Irremore, Lixnaw. During the Irish War of Independence, he was Battalion Engineer for the 2nd Battalion, Kerry No.1 Brigade. Following the signing of the Anglo-Irish Treaty he fought on the anti-treaty side in the Irish Civil War.

He was first elected to Dáil Éireann as a Fianna Fáil Teachta Dála (TD) for the Kerry constituency at the June 1927 general election. He was re-elected at the September 1927 general election. He did not contest the 1932 general election.

O'Leary continued his activity in politics outside of parliament. He had been elected to Kerry County Council in 1928, and held his seat until his death. In 1937 he was elected to Fianna Fáil's National Executive.

When the Agricultural Wages Board was formed in 1937 he was named as chairman, a post he held until his death.

In his later years he lived in Clontarf, Dublin. He died at a nursing home in Rathmines on 27 November 1955, aged 61, and was buried in Mulhuddart Cemetery.

Dáil	Election	Deputy (Party)	Deputy (Party)	Deputy (Party)	Deputy (Party)	Deputy (Party)	Deputy (Party)	Deputy (Party)
4th	1923	Tom McEllistrim (Rep)	Austin Stack (Rep)	Patrick Cahill (Rep)	Thomas O'Donoghue (Rep)	James Crowley (CnaG)	Fionán Lynch (CnaG)	John O'Sullivan (CnaG)
5th	1927 (Jun)	Tom McEllistrim (FF)	Austin Stack (SF)	William O'Leary (FF)	Thomas O'Reilly (FF)	James Crowley (CnaG)	Fionán Lynch (CnaG)	John O'Sullivan (CnaG)
6th	1927 (Sep)	Tom McEllistrim (FF)	Frederick Crowley (FF)	William O'Leary (FF)	Thomas O'Reilly (FF)	James Crowley (CnaG)	Fionán Lynch (CnaG)	John O'Sullivan (CnaG)
7th	1932	Tom McEllistrim (FF)	Frederick Crowley (FF)	John Flynn (FF)	Thomas O'Reilly (FF)	Eamon Kissane (FF)	Fionán Lynch (CnaG)	John O'Sullivan (CnaG)
8th	1933	Tom McEllistrim (FF)	Frederick Crowley (FF)	John Flynn (FF)	Denis Daly (FF)	Eamon Kissane (FF)	Fionán Lynch (CnaG)	John O'Sullivan (CnaG)
9th	1937	Constituency abolished. See Kerry North and Kerry South						

Dáil	Election	Deputy (Party)	Deputy (Party)	Deputy (Party)	Deputy (Party)	Deputy (Party)
32nd	2016	Martin Ferris (SF)	Michael Healy-Rae (Ind.)	Danny Healy-Rae (Ind.)	John Brassil (FF)	Brendan Griffin (FG)
33rd	2020	Pa Daly (SF)	Michael Healy-Rae (Ind.)	Danny Healy-Rae (Ind.)	Norma Foley (FF)	Brendan Griffin (FG)
34th	2024	Pa Daly (SF)	Michael Healy-Rae (Ind.)	Danny Healy-Rae (Ind.)	Norma Foley (FF)	Michael Cahill (FF)
