= Kerry (Dáil constituency) =

Dáil constituency (1923–1937, 2016–present)

- Dáil constituency
- Location of Kerry within Ireland
- Interactive map of constituency boundaries since the 2024 general election
- Major settlements: Dingle; Killarney; Kenmare; Listowel; Tarbert; Tralee

Current constituency
- Created: 2016
- Seats: 5
- TDs: Michael Cahill (FF); Pa Daly (SF); Norma Foley (FF); Danny Healy-Rae (Ind); Michael Healy-Rae (Ind)
- Local government area: County Kerry
- Created from: Kerry North–West Limerick; Kerry South
- EP constituency: South

Kerry
- Former Dáil constituency
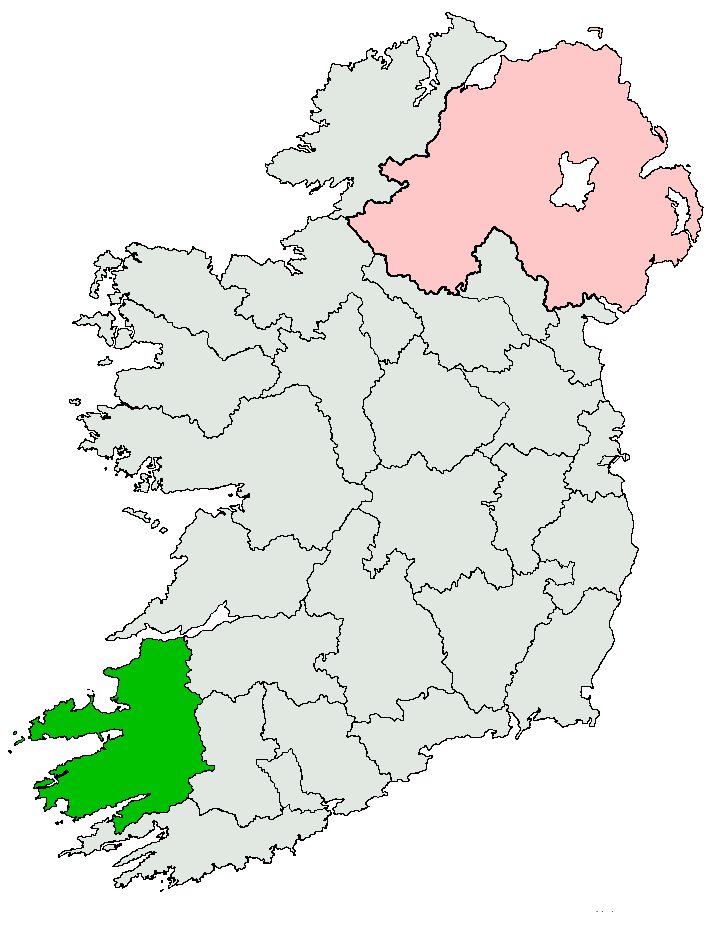
- Location of Kerry within Ireland

Former constituency
- Created: 1923
- Abolished: 1937
- Seats: 7
- Local government area: County Kerry
- Created from: Kerry–Limerick West
- Replaced by: Kerry North; Kerry South

Kerry is a parliamentary constituency that has been represented in Dáil Éireann, the lower house of the Irish parliament or Oireachtas, since the 2016 general election. The constituency elects five deputies (Teachtaí Dála, commonly known as TDs) on the system of proportional representation by means of the single transferable vote (PR-STV). Another constituency of the same name existed between 1923 and 1937.

== History and boundaries ==
=== 1923–1937 ===
The constituency was created under the Electoral Act 1923, and first used at the 1923 general election to elect the 4th Dáil. It replaced the Kerry–Limerick West constituency which was used to elect the 2nd Dáil and the 3rd Dáil. It consisted of the administrative county of Kerry. The constituency elected 7 deputies.

It was abolished by the Electoral (Revision of Constituencies) Act 1935 and the new Kerry South and Kerry North constituencies were created. They were first used at the 1937 general election for the 9th Dáil.

=== Since 2016 ===
The Constituency Commission proposed in its 2012 report that at the next general election a new constituency called Kerry be created. The report proposed changes to the constituencies of Ireland so as to reduce the total number of TDs from 166 to 158.

It was established by the Electoral (Amendment) (Dáil Constituencies) Act 2013. The new constituency replaces the constituencies of Kerry North–West Limerick and Kerry South. It comprises the whole of County Kerry with the Limerick part of the Kerry North–West Limerick transferred to Limerick County.

The 2013 Act defines the constituency as:

"The county of Kerry."

The Constituency Review Report 2023 of the Electoral Commission recommended that no change be made at the next general election.

== TDs ==
=== TDs 1923–1937 ===
Teachtaí Dála (TDs) for Kerry 1923–1937
Key to parties: CnaG = Cumann na nGaedheal; FF = Fianna Fáil; Rep = Republican
Dáil	Election	Deputy (Party)	Deputy (Party)	Deputy (Party)	Deputy (Party)	Deputy (Party)	Deputy (Party)	Deputy (Party)
4th	1923	Tom McEllistrim (Rep)	Austin Stack (Rep)	Patrick Cahill (Rep)	Thomas O'Donoghue (Rep)	James Crowley (CnaG)	Fionán Lynch (CnaG)	John O'Sullivan (CnaG)
5th	1927 (Jun)	Tom McEllistrim (FF)	Austin Stack (SF)	William O'Leary (FF)	Thomas O'Reilly (FF)	James Crowley (CnaG)	Fionán Lynch (CnaG)	John O'Sullivan (CnaG)
6th	1927 (Sep)	Tom McEllistrim (FF)	Frederick Crowley (FF)	William O'Leary (FF)	Thomas O'Reilly (FF)	James Crowley (CnaG)	Fionán Lynch (CnaG)	John O'Sullivan (CnaG)
7th	1932	Tom McEllistrim (FF)	Frederick Crowley (FF)	John Flynn (FF)	Thomas O'Reilly (FF)	Eamon Kissane (FF)	Fionán Lynch (CnaG)	John O'Sullivan (CnaG)
8th	1933	Tom McEllistrim (FF)	Frederick Crowley (FF)	John Flynn (FF)	Denis Daly (FF)	Eamon Kissane (FF)	Fionán Lynch (CnaG)	John O'Sullivan (CnaG)
9th	1937	Constituency abolished. See Kerry North and Kerry South						

Note: The columns in this table are used only for presentational purposes, and no significance should be attached to the order of columns. For details of the order in which seats were won at each election, see the detailed results of that election.

=== TDs since 2016 ===
Teachtaí Dála (TDs) for Kerry 2016–
Key to parties: FF = Fianna Fáil; FG = Fine Gael; Ind = Independent; SF = Sinn Féin
Dáil	Election	Deputy (Party)	Deputy (Party)	Deputy (Party)	Deputy (Party)	Deputy (Party)
32nd	2016	Martin Ferris (SF)	Michael Healy-Rae (Ind)	Danny Healy-Rae (Ind)	John Brassil (FF)	Brendan Griffin (FG)
33rd	2020	Pa Daly (SF)	Michael Healy-Rae (Ind)	Danny Healy-Rae (Ind)	Norma Foley (FF)	Brendan Griffin (FG)
34th	2024	Pa Daly (SF)	Michael Healy-Rae (Ind)	Danny Healy-Rae (Ind)	Norma Foley (FF)	Michael Cahill (FF)

Note: The columns in this table are used only for presentational purposes, and no significance should be attached to the order of columns. For details of the order in which seats were won at each election, see the detailed results of that election.

== Elections ==
*: Outgoing TD

=== 2024 general election ===
2024 general election: Kerry
Party	Candidate	FPv%	Count												
Party	Candidate	FPv%	1	2	3	4	5	6	7	8	9	10	11	12	13
Independent	Michael Healy-Rae	23.7	18,596												
Sinn Féin	Pa Daly	14.8	11,647	12,272	12,298	12,382	12,675	12,802	13,751						
Fianna Fáil	Norma Foley	13.1	10,302	11,099	11,143	11,165	11,201	11,446	11,471	11,488	11,600	12,155	12,524	12,783	13,654
Independent	Danny Healy-Rae	11.0	8,603	11,236	11,294	11,387	11,420	11,633	11,708	11,894	12,486	12,978	13,239		
Fianna Fáil	Michael Cahill	10.5	8,266	8,747	8,765	8,820	8,830	8,931	9,008	9,069	9,181	9,820	10,047	10,433	10,932
Fine Gael	Billy O'Shea	10.1	7,932	8,261	8,273	8,292	8,312	8,400	8,420	8,437	8,506	8,737	9,137	9,366	10,175
Fianna Fáil	Linda Gordon Kelleher	2.6	2,024	2,116	2,127	2,130	2,140	2,167	2,183	2,197	2,230				
Green	Cleo Murphy	2.5	1,982	2,027	2,041	2,047	2,247	2,266	2,306	2,417	2,437	2,496	3,185	3,439	
Labour	Mike Kennedy	2.3	1,826	1,950	1,958	1,979	2,145	2,190	2,223	2,345	2,389	2,438			
Independent	Michelle Keane	2.0	1,530	1,614	1,674	1,903	1,923	2,016	2,030	2,081					
Aontú	Catherina O'Sullivan	1.8	1,437	1,502	1,648	1,789	1,846	1,952	2,020	2,109	2,724	2,785	2,897		
Sinn Féin	Stephanie O'Shea	1.4	1,114	1,173	1,184	1,192	1,365	1,384							
PBP–Solidarity	Cian Prendiville (Note: Prendiville is a member of People Before Profit.)	1.3	1,012	1,046	1,066	1,089									
Independent Ireland	Tom McEllistrim	1.3	983	1,064	1,099	1,163	1,181								
Irish Freedom	Brandon Begley	0.9	738	762	816										
Independent	Mary Fitzgibbon	0.6	469	502											
Independent	John O'Leary	0.1	34	41											
Electorate: 120,868 Valid: 78,495 Spoilt: 504 Quota: 13,083 Turnout: 65.4%

=== 2020 general election ===
2020 general election: Kerry
Party	Candidate	FPv%	Count							
Party	Candidate	FPv%	1	2	3	4	5	6	7	8
Independent	Michael Healy-Rae	21.6	16,818							
Sinn Féin	Pa Daly	20.3	15,733							
Fine Gael	Brendan Griffin	13.3	10,296	10,838	11,073	11,261	12,255	14,703		
Independent	Danny Healy-Rae	11.2	8,663	10,604	11,333	12,090	12,664	13,000		
Fianna Fáil	Norma Foley	8.8	6,856	7,271	7,647	7,934	9,111	9,593	10,128	11,989
Fianna Fáil	John Brassil	7.0	5,431	5,665	5,844	6,089	6,748	7,230	7,682	8,655
Green	Cleo Murphy	5.3	4,122	4,273	4,808	5,263	5,604	5,811	6,229	
Fine Gael	Mike Kennelly	5.1	3,974	4,153	4,278	4,379	4,419			
Fianna Fáil	Norma Moriarty	4.9	3,767	4,049	4,145	4,217				
Aontú	Sonny Foran	1.4	1,109	1,180	1,404					
Irish Freedom	John Bowler	0.6	473	501	640					
Independent	Ted Cronin	0.5	391	417	544					
Independent	Sean O'Leary	0.1	33	37	60					
Electorate: 116,885 Valid: 77,666 Spoilt: 543 (0.7%) Quota: 12,945 Turnout: 66.9%

=== 2016 general election ===
2016 general election: Kerry
Party	Candidate	FPv%	Count										
Party	Candidate	FPv%	1	2	3	4	5	6	7	8	9	10	11
Independent	Michael Healy-Rae	25.7	20,378										
Independent	Danny Healy-Rae	12.6	9,991	13,826									
Fine Gael	Brendan Griffin	12.2	9,674	10,381	10,520	10,608	10,661	10,827	10,999	11,223	11,396	12,545	14,050
Sinn Féin	Martin Ferris	11.9	9,458	10,098	10,214	10,321	10,364	10,418	10,490	10,583	11,722	12,184	12,964
Fianna Fáil	John Brassil	10.3	8,156	8,642	8,719	8,764	8,957	9,005	9,137	9,242	9,495	11,955	12,792
Fine Gael	Jimmy Deenihan	8.2	6,489	6,827	6,872	6,901	6,944	7,168	7,257	7,326	7,630	7,849	9,779
Labour	Arthur Spring	6.1	4,813	5,011	5,036	5,067	5,093	5,281	5,356	5,601	5,887	6,139	
Fianna Fáil	Norma Moriarty	5.5	4,348	4,893	5,012	5,032	5,081	5,114	5,172	5,252	5,392		
Independent	Michael O'Gorman	1.6	1,236	1,364	1,380	1,487	1,529	1,536	1,589	1,674			
Green	Michael Fitzgerald	1.3	1,011	1,050	1,059	1,085	1,123	1,135	1,222				
AAA–PBP	Brian Finucane	1.2	981	1,046	1,058	1,129	1,161	1,169	1,261	1,429			
Fine Gael	Grace O'Donnell	1.0	776	817	827	836	854						
Renua	Donal Corcoran	0.9	716	769	780	801	886	900					
Independent	Mary Fitzgibbon	0.8	635	690	707	752							
Independent	Kevin Murphy	0.6	464	491	505								
Independent	Henry Gaynor	0.2	147	155	158								
Electorate: 112,751 Valid: 79,273 Spoilt: 476 (0.6%) Quota: 13,213 Turnout: 79,749 (70.7%)

=== 1933 general election ===
1933 general election: Kerry
Party	Candidate	FPv%	Count					
Party	Candidate	FPv%	1	2	3	4	5	6
Fianna Fáil	Eamon Kissane	15.2	10,238					
Fianna Fáil	Tom McEllistrim	14.4	9,694					
Fianna Fáil	John Flynn	13.9	9,372					
Fianna Fáil	Denis Daly	12.3	8,290	9,558				
Fianna Fáil	Frederick Crowley	11.9	8,039	8,439				
Cumann na nGaedheal	Fionán Lynch	9.7	6,578	6,600	6,825	7,698	8,056	8,083
Cumann na nGaedheal	John O'Sullivan	9.3	6,259	6,265	6,510	7,415	7,746	7,749
Cumann na nGaedheal	Con Brosnan	8.7	5,867	5,938	6,187	7,362	7,610	7,636
National Centre Party	Edmond O'Connor	4.7	3,141	3,177	3,629			
Electorate: 83,371 Valid: 67,478 Quota: 8,435 Turnout: 80.9%

=== 1932 general election ===
1932 general election: Kerry
Party	Candidate	FPv%	Count				
Party	Candidate	FPv%	1	2	3	4	5
Fianna Fáil	John Flynn	12.7	7,638				
Fianna Fáil	Eamon Kissane	12.2	7,364	7,459	8,386		
Fianna Fáil	Frederick Crowley	11.8	7,134	7,306	7,675		
Fianna Fáil	Tom McEllistrim	11.5	6,930	7,062	7,733		
Fianna Fáil	Thomas O'Reilly	11.1	6,691	6,923	7,273	7,635	
Cumann na nGaedheal	Fionán Lynch	10.4	6,266	7,412	8,067		
Cumann na nGaedheal	John O'Sullivan	9.4	5,686	6,340	7,146	7,181	7,480
Cumann na nGaedheal	James Crowley	7.7	4,644	5,200	6,072	6,265	6,490
Farmers' Party	Patrick Trant	7.5	4,548	4,854			
Cumann na nGaedheal	John Moore	5.7	3,409				
Electorate: 79,465 Valid: 60,310 Quota: 7,539 Turnout: 75.9%

=== September 1927 general election ===
September 1927 general election: Kerry
Party	Candidate	FPv%	Count					
Party	Candidate	FPv%	1	2	3	4	5	6
Cumann na nGaedheal	Fionán Lynch	12.3	6,866	7,108				
Cumann na nGaedheal	John O'Sullivan	11.3	6,296	6,373	7,958			
Fianna Fáil	Tom McEllistrim	11.1	6,190	6,309	6,579	6,938	7,073	
Fianna Fáil	Thomas O'Reilly	10.8	6,039	6,044	6,166	6,250	6,269	6,314
Fianna Fáil	William O'Leary	10.7	5,993	6,378	6,508	6,720	6,860	6,966
Fianna Fáil	Frederick Crowley	10.3	5,762	5,784	6,040	6,189	6,221	6,401
Cumann na nGaedheal	James Crowley	10.1	5,651	5,841	6,114	8,754		
Fianna Fáil	Michael O'Donnell	9.0	5,027	5,066	5,157	5,341	5,422	5,477
Cumann na nGaedheal	Thomas Slattery	6.2	3,473	3,639	4,052			
Farmers' Party	Patrick O'Shea	5.2	2,903	3,300				
Farmers' Party	Maurice Lawlor	3.0	1,691					
Electorate: 78,540 Valid: 55,891 Quota: 6,987 Turnout: 71.2%

=== June 1927 general election ===
June 1927 general election: Kerry
Party	Candidate	FPv%	Count														
Party	Candidate	FPv%	1	2	3	4	5	6	7	8	9	10	11	12	13	14	15
Cumann na nGaedheal	Fionán Lynch	10.2	5,483	5,512	5,576	5,605	5,638	5,682	5,704	6,181	6,765						
Sinn Féin	Austin Stack	9.5	5,140	5,185	5,225	5,338	5,462	5,563	5,668	5,716	5,805	5,955	7,511				
Cumann na nGaedheal	John O'Sullivan	8.5	4,569	4,577	4,607	4,677	4,708	4,754	4,897	5,210	5,498	6,563	6,669	6,682	7,161		
Fianna Fáil	Thomas O'Reilly	8.3	4,492	4,493	4,510	4,561	4,593	4,608	4,625	4,628	4,636	4,765	4,904	4,977	5,108	5,121	5,325
Cumann na nGaedheal	James Crowley	7.9	4,246	4,253	4,268	4,313	4,331	4,663	4,707	4,885	5,408	5,518	5,558	5,571	5,826	5,933	6,584
Fianna Fáil	William O'Leary	7.1	3,849	3,864	3,897	3,919	4,002	4,113	4,172	4,188	4,591	4,654	5,250	5,531	5,884	5,902	6,251
Fianna Fáil	Frederick Crowley	6.3	3,370	3,381	3,392	3,554	3,575	3,630	3,659	3,690	3,736	3,945	4,035	4,111	4,403	4,418	4,935
Fianna Fáil	Tom McEllistrim	6.0	3,207	3,259	3,369	3,434	3,534	3,671	3,878	3,948	4,032	4,222	4,564	4,831	5,546	5,575	6,133
Fianna Fáil	Michael O'Donnell	5.5	2,975	2,980	3,064	3,085	3,115	3,165	3,192	3,271	3,303	3,359					
Independent	Eugene O'Sullivan	4.5	2,405	2,414	2,451	2,565	2,589	2,675	2,751	2,830	2,926						
Farmers' Party	Patrick O'Shea	4.1	2,205	2,207	2,275	2,355	2,372	2,399	3,168	3,253	3,366	3,919	4,053	4,067	4,223	4,272	
Labour	Patrick Casey	4.0	2,141	2,266	2,283	2,401	2,876	2,919	2,969	3,133	3,269	3,404	3,541	3,579			
Cumann na nGaedheal	Florence Harty	3.8	2,063	2,089	2,110	2,119	2,149	2,198	2,247	2,590							
Cumann na nGaedheal	Thomas Dennehy	3.2	1,749	1,795	1,817	1,836	1,867	1,884	1,977								
Farmers' Party	Charles Roche	3.0	1,637	1,644	1,682	1,695	1,713	1,746									
Independent	William McElligott	2.1	1,109	1,131	1,166	1,187	1,208										
Labour	Diarmuid O'Leary	2.0	1,054	1,082	1,106	1,116											
Independent	Kate Breen	1.8	978	983	994												
Farmers' Party	John Kavanagh	1.4	729	741													
Clann Éireann	Eamon Horan	0.9	484														
Electorate: 78,540 Valid: 53,885 Quota: 6,736 Turnout: 68.6%

=== 1923 general election ===
1923 general election: Kerry
Party	Candidate	FPv%	Count										
Party	Candidate	FPv%	1	2	3	4	5	6	7	8	9	10	11
Republican	Austin Stack	18.8	10,333										
Cumann na nGaedheal	Fionán Lynch	16.4	8,982										
Republican	Tom McEllistrim	13.3	7,277										
Republican	Thomas O'Donoghue	8.0	4,414	5,839	5,862	6,018	6,038	6,141	6,162	6,232	6,363	6,514	6,972
Cumann na nGaedheal	John O'Sullivan	6.9	3,759	3,807	4,500	4,508	4,524	4,607	5,167	5,428	5,542	6,087	6,759
Cumann na nGaedheal	James Crowley	6.9	3,759	3,773	4,321	4,323	4,468	4,519	5,304	5,486	5,588	5,992	6,648
Farmers' Party	Denis Brosnan	5.8	3,182	3,254	3,344	3,361	3,388	3,507	3,569	4,629	4,884	5,224	5,468
Republican	Patrick Cahill	4.9	2,708	4,144	4,152	4,315	4,324	4,498	4,524	4,609	4,891	5,170	5,955
Labour	Patrick Casey	4.2	2,329	2,447	2,481	2,496	2,543	2,733	2,860	2,942	4,060	4,324	
Labour	Cormack Walsh	3.6	1,974	2,030	2,062	2,071	2,091	2,155	2,181	2,218			
Farmers' Party	John O'Neill	3.1	1,674	1,781	1,868	1,879	1,892	2,021	2,128				
Independent	Thomas O'Donnell	3.0	1,640	1,727	1,809	1,822	1,846	1,997	2,131	2,317	2,390		
Cumann na nGaedheal	Thomas Dennehy	2.4	1,308	1,324	1,805	1,807	1,837	1,940					
Independent	Jeremiah McSweeney	2.0	1,124	1,203	1,243	1,267	1,289						
Independent	Edward J. Gleeson	0.7	382	401	409	410							
Electorate: 90,156 Valid: 54,845 Quota: 6,856 Turnout: 60.8%

== See also ==
- Dáil constituencies
- Elections in the Republic of Ireland
- Politics of the Republic of Ireland
- List of Dáil by-elections
- List of political parties in the Republic of Ireland
