= Piaras Béaslaí =

Irish politician (1881–1965)

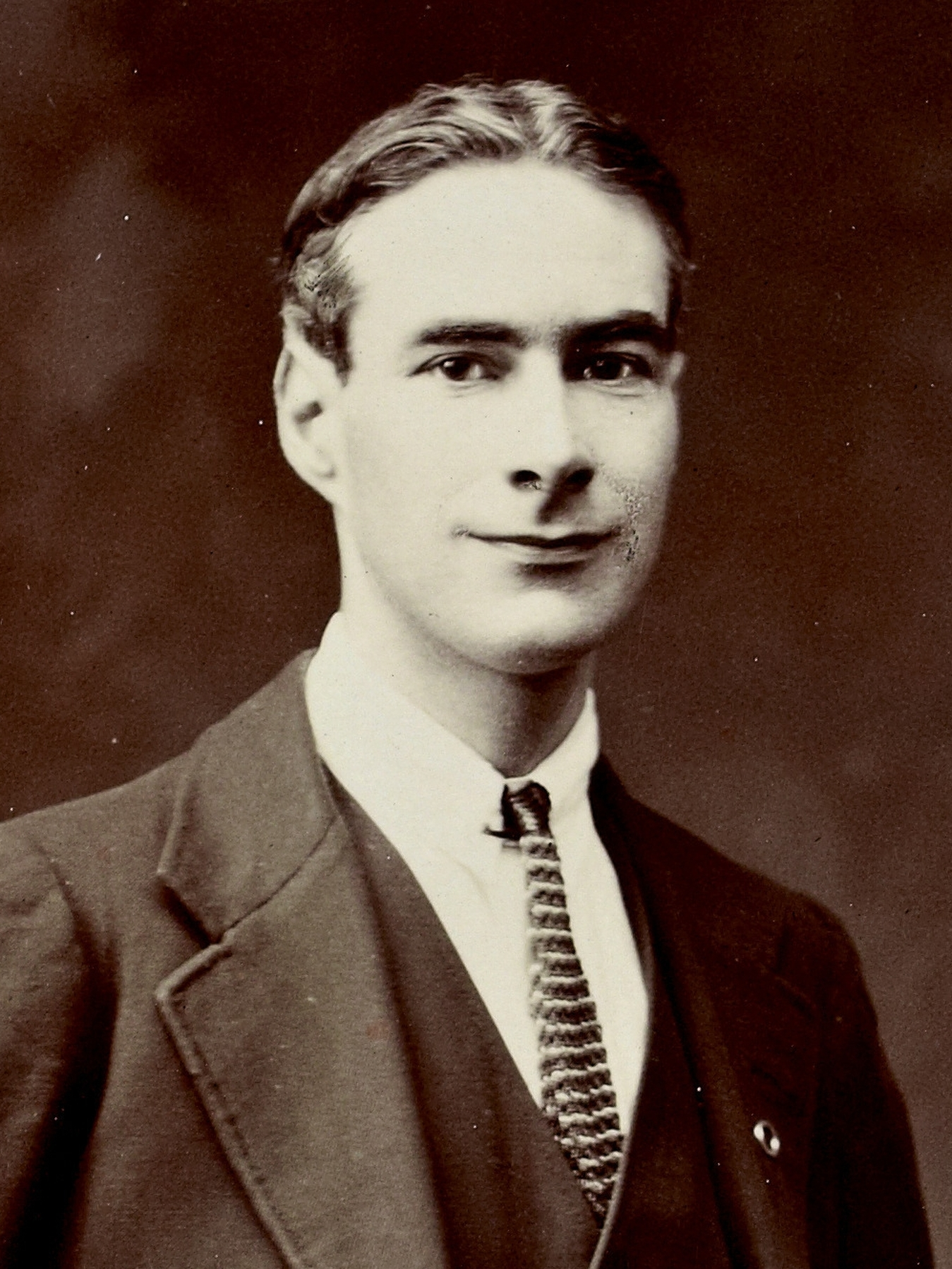
- Béaslaí in 1923

Teachta Dála
- In office May 1921 – August 1923
- Constituency: Kerry–Limerick West
- In office December 1918 – May 1921
- Constituency: Kerry East

Personal details
- Born: Percy Frederick Beazley; 15 February 1881 Liverpool, England
- Died: 22 June 1965 (aged 84) Dublin, Ireland
- Resting place: Glasnevin Cemetery, Dublin, Ireland
- Party: Sinn Féin
- Education: St Francis Xavier's College, Liverpool
- Occupation: Playwright; biographer; language revivalist; politician; journalist; press censor

Piaras Béaslaí ([ˈpʲiəɾˠ.əsˠ ˈbʲeːsˠ.l̪ˠiː]; 15 February 1881 – 22 June 1965) was an Irish author, playwright, biographer and translator, who was a member of the Irish Republican Brotherhood, fought in the Easter Rising and served as a member of Dáil Éireann.

== Early life ==
Piaras Béaslaí was born Percy Frederick Beazley in Liverpool, England on 15 February 1881 to Irish Catholic parents, Patrick Langford Beazley and Nannie Hickey. Patrick Langford Beazley, from Killarney, County Kerry, moved to Egremont, Cumbria and was the editor of The Catholic Times newspaper for 40 years; Nannie Hickey was from Newcastle West, County Limerick. Béaslaí's parents married in March 1878, in the West Derby district of the county of Lancashire. During his summer holidays in his younger years, he spent time in Ireland (near Kenmare, County Kerry) with his paternal uncle, Father James Beazley, where he began to learn Irish. Béaslaí was educated at St Xavier's Jesuit College in Liverpool, where he developed his keen interest in Irish; by the time he was aged 17 his Irish proficiency was exceptional.

== Literary career ==
After finishing his education at St Xavier's, Béaslaí was encouraged to begin Irish poetry by Tadhg Ó Donnchadha. Béaslaí followed his father's footsteps into journalism; he began by working for the local Wallasey News, and in 1906 he moved to Dublin, and within a year became a freelance writer for the Irish Peasant, Irish Independent, Freeman's Journal and Express. He was offered a permanent position with Independent Newspapers, as assistant leader writer and special reporter for the Dublin Evening Telegraph. He wrote regularly for the Freeman's Journal, including a daily half-column in Irish.

After his early introduction to Irish poetry he became involved in staging Irish-language amateur drama at the Oireachtas annual music festival. Béaslaí began to write both original works and adaptations from foreign languages. One of these works, Eachtra Pheadair Schlemiel (1909), was translated from German into Irish.

Later he continued to write poetry, such as the collection "Bealtaine 1916" agus Dánta Eile (1920), and short stories such as "Earc agus Aine agus Scéalta Eile". Between 1913 and 1939 he wrote many plays, including Cliuche Cartaí (1920), An Sgaothaire agus Cúig Drámaí Eile (1929), An Danar (1929) and An Bhean Chródha (1931). He wrote two books about his comrade Michael Collins: Michael Collins and the Making of a New Ireland (2 volumes, 1926) and Michael Collins: Soldier and Statesman (1937).

His works revolved around the Irish language movement and the IRA; these works focused on the independence struggle of Ireland. He wrote about these topics in newspapers such as the Standard and The Kerryman; his most notable work in newspapers during his later life included his contribution to the Irish Independent, which published a section called ‘A Veteran Remembers’ five days a week from 16 May to June 1957, as well as a weekly section called ‘Moods and Memories’ on Wednesdays from 24 May 1961 to 16 June 1965.

One of the awards Béaslaí gained during his career was, on 14 August 1928, a gold medal at the Tailteann Literary Awards. While in Dublin, he joined the Keating Branch of the Gaelic League, and after he moved to Ireland he began using the Irish form of his name, Piaras Béaslaí, rather than Percy Beazley.

== Role in the 1916 Rising ==
A founding member of The Irish Volunteers in 1913, in January 1916 he served as a courier for political activist and revolutionary leader Seán Mac Diarmada. By the time of the Easter Rising that year, Béaslaí was deputy commanding officer of the IRAs 1st Dublin Battalion under Ned Daly. In an audio recording to which he contributed in 1958, he detailed his experience in the Rising, describing the rebels assembling before noon in Blackhall Street at battalion headquarters. After midday they marched out to the Four Courts, erecting barricades as they did so. The Four Courts was his main station.

In the audio, he recalls a green flag with a gold harp in the centre; this was the non-Sinn Féin flag at the time. On the Friday evening the General Post Office, Dublin. Béaslaí was in direct charge of the Four Courts area, and at one point during the fight he ordered a complete blackout. He recalled "things were going badly for the English soldiers" and described the whole event as "a weird experience". He remembers the streets being lit up with fires in the darkness as if it were bright as day. He speaks of the intensity of the firing line and then how it suddenly ceased on the Friday. He remembered falling asleep and when he woke being presented with PH Pearse's order to surrender. The rebels were brought to Richmond barracks. Béaslaí then spent fifteen months in English prisons.

Béaslaí served three years for penal servitude divided between a stringent Portland prison and a more lenient Lewes prison. He was then imprisoned two times within four months during 1919, both terms ending in celebrated escapes. After his final prison release, Michael Collins approached Béaslaí to edit An tOglach, the Irish Volunteer newspaper; this saw communication between GHQ and local volunteers drastically improved.

== Political career ==
Later, Béaslaí became director of publicity for the Irish Republican Army, and at the 1918 general election he was elected to the First Dáil Éireann as Sinn Féin MP for Kerry East. Sinn Féin MPs who had been elected in the Westminster elections of 1918 refused to recognise the Parliament of the United Kingdom, and instead assembled the following January at the Mansion House in Dublin as a revolutionary parliament, Dáil Éireann. Béaslaí was noted for his translation of the democratic programme of the First Dáil, which he read aloud at the inaugural sitting.

He was a member of the Sinn Féin party for five years. Between 1919 and 1921 he represented the Kerry East constituency in the First Dáil. Then, at the 1921 general election, he was returned unopposed to the Second Dáil as a Sinn Féin Teachta Dála (TD) for Kerry–Limerick West. Following the signing of the Anglo-Irish Treaty, Béaslaí was re-elected there unopposed at the 1922 election as a pro-Treaty Sinn Féin candidate, and was thus a member of the 3rd Dáil, which was Pro-Treaty at this stage. In 1922 he went to the US to explain the Treaty to Sinn Féin's Irish-American supporters. He did not contest the 1923 election.

He and Con Collins share the distinction of having been elected in three Irish general elections unopposed by any other candidates.

== Gaelic League ==
During Béaslaí's time in London, he gave a lot of his time to the Gaelic League. In the Keating branch of the league, in Ireland, Béaslaí developed an interest in the IRB. Cathal Brugha, a branch member, asked him to join the IRB. The Keating branch was where Béaslaí met Michael Collins, eventually introducing Collins to his cousin and fellow branch member, Elizabeth Mernin. Béaslaí was also instrumental in establishing An Fáinne, an Irish-speaking league whose members vowed to speak solely Irish among themselves and wore a membership badge of a circle. This coincided with his involvement in the Irish Republican Brotherhood. Béaslaí's love of the Irish language gave him an opportunity to delve into his other hobbies. He wrote for Banba, an Irish journal published by the Gaelic League. He was able to express his love for theatre, in the Gaelic League, forming a group of men called "Na hAisteoirí".

== Death ==
Béaslaí died, unmarried, aged 84 on 22 June 1965, in a nursing home in Dublin. He was buried in a plot in Glasnevin Cemetery, after a Requiem Mass in St Columba's Church, Iona Road, Glasnevin.

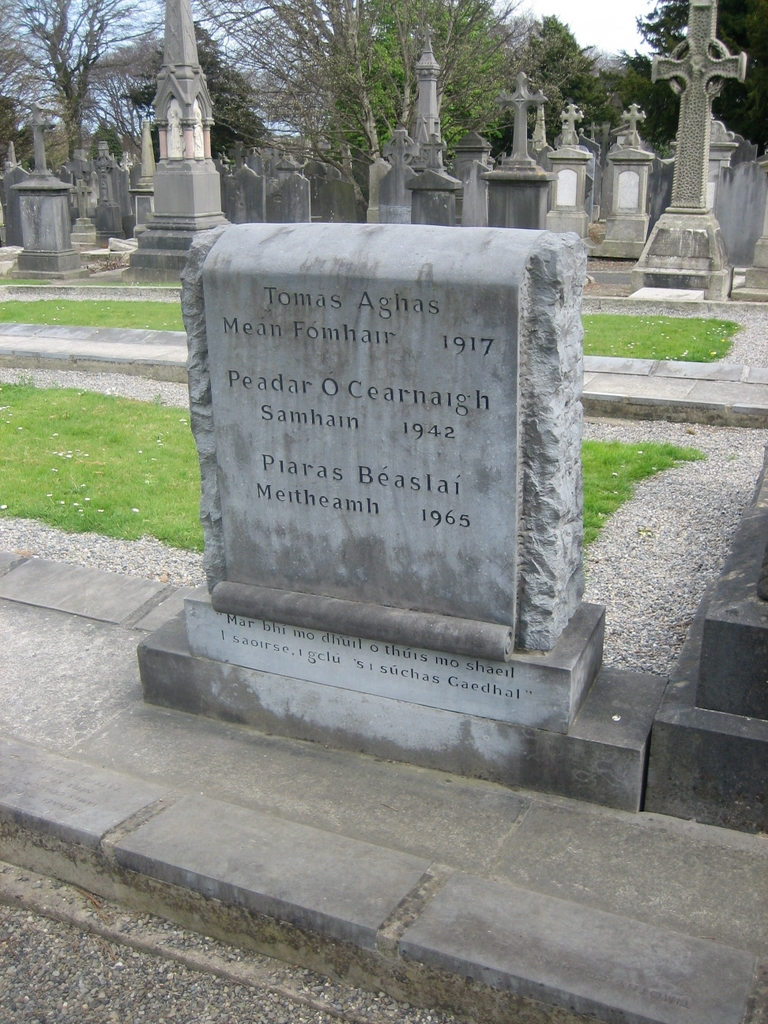
The gravestone of Thomas Ashe, Peadar Kearney and Piaras Béaslaí at Glasnevin Cemetery.

== Works ==
- Fear an sgéilín grinn: Dráma suilt (1900)
- Eaċtra Ṗeadair Schlemihl (1909)
- Michael Collins: Soldier and Statesman (1937)

Parliament of the United Kingdom
Preceded by Timothy O'Sullivan	Member of Parliament for Kerry East; 1918–1922	Constituency abolished
Oireachtas
New constituency	Teachta Dála for Kerry East; 1918–1921	Constituency abolished

Dáil	Election	Deputy (Party)	Deputy (Party)	Deputy (Party)	Deputy (Party)	Deputy (Party)	Deputy (Party)	Deputy (Party)	Deputy (Party)
2nd	1921	Piaras Béaslaí (SF)	James Crowley (SF)	Fionán Lynch (SF)	Patrick Cahill (SF)	Con Collins (SF)	Thomas O'Donoghue (SF)	Edmund Roche (SF)	Austin Stack (SF)
3rd	1922	Piaras Béaslaí (PT-SF)	James Crowley (PT-SF)	Fionán Lynch (PT-SF)	Patrick Cahill (AT-SF)	Con Collins (AT-SF)	Thomas O'Donoghue (AT-SF)	Edmund Roche (AT-SF)	Austin Stack (AT-SF)
4th	1923	Constituency abolished. See Kerry and Limerick							
