= Michael Austin (politician) =

Irish politician and trade unionist

Michael Austin (1855 – 18 February 1916) was an Irish politician and trade unionist.

Born in Cork, Austin was educated at a Christian Brothers school before completing an apprenticeship as a compositor. He was a leading member of the Cork Trades Council, and in 1890 was the founding secretary of the Irish Democratic Trade and Labour Federation, a body which aimed to bring about the political representation of workers in rural areas of Ireland.

The Federation's other leading member was Michael Davitt, and he persuaded the anti-Parnellite Irish National Federation to stand Austin and Eugene Crean as two trade union candidates in the 1892 general election. Austin was elected for West Limerick, and held his seat at the 1895 general election, standing down in 1900. While in Parliament, he served on the Royal Commission on Labour. The Federation could not retain his energies after election to parliament, resulting in its discipitation.

Parliament of the United Kingdom
Preceded by William Abraham	Member of Parliament for West Limerick; 1892 – 1900	Succeeded by Patrick O'Shaughnessey
