= Patrick O'Shaughnessy (politician) =

Irish politician

Patrick Joseph O'Shaughnessy (1872 – 29 December 1920) was an Irish nationalist politician and Member of Parliament (MP) in the House of Commons of the United Kingdom of Great Britain and Ireland.

He was first elected unopposed as the Irish Parliamentary Party MP for the Limerick West constituency at the 1900 general election. He was re-elected at the 1906, January 1910 and December 1910 general elections. He lost his seat at the 1918 general election.

Parliament of the United Kingdom
Preceded by Michael Austin	Member of Parliament for Limerick West; 1900 – 1918	Succeeded by Con Collins
