= Denis Daly (Kerry politician) =

Irish politician (1886–1965)

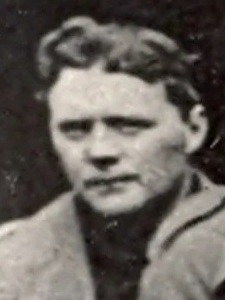
- Daly in 1922

Teachta Dála
- In office January 1933 – July 1937
- Constituency: Kerry

Personal details
- Born: 1886 Caherciveen, County Kerry, Ireland
- Died: 21 March 1965 (aged 79) Caherciveen, County Kerry, Ireland
- Party: Fianna Fáil

Denis Daly (1886 – 21 March 1965) was an Irish Fianna Fáil politician from Caherciveen, County Kerry.

Daly worked in the civil service in London where he became an associate of Michael Collins and was sworn into the Irish Republican Brotherhood. He returned to Ireland in 1916, taking part in the Easter Rising. in Dublin. During the Irish War of Independence, Daly was Brigade Vice Commandant of the Kerry No. 3 Brigade, Irish Republican Army.

Following the signing of the Anglo-Irish Treaty he fought on the anti-Treaty side in Irish Civil War. He was arrested in March 1923 by National forces and interned until March 1924. Daly was later awarded a pension by the Irish government under the Military Service Pensions Act, 1934 for his service with the IRA between 1916 and 1923.

He was elected as a Fianna Fáil Teachta Dála (TD) at the 1933 general election for the Kerry constituency. The Irish Independent reported that party politics had small appeal to him and that he made no speeches during the campaign. He served one term and did not contest the 1937 general election.

Daly was an enthusiastic Gaelic footballer and for many years was the chairman of the South Kerry Gaelic Athletic Association Board.

Dáil	Election	Deputy (Party)	Deputy (Party)	Deputy (Party)	Deputy (Party)	Deputy (Party)	Deputy (Party)	Deputy (Party)
4th	1923	Tom McEllistrim (Rep)	Austin Stack (Rep)	Patrick Cahill (Rep)	Thomas O'Donoghue (Rep)	James Crowley (CnaG)	Fionán Lynch (CnaG)	John O'Sullivan (CnaG)
5th	1927 (Jun)	Tom McEllistrim (FF)	Austin Stack (SF)	William O'Leary (FF)	Thomas O'Reilly (FF)	James Crowley (CnaG)	Fionán Lynch (CnaG)	John O'Sullivan (CnaG)
6th	1927 (Sep)	Tom McEllistrim (FF)	Frederick Crowley (FF)	William O'Leary (FF)	Thomas O'Reilly (FF)	James Crowley (CnaG)	Fionán Lynch (CnaG)	John O'Sullivan (CnaG)
7th	1932	Tom McEllistrim (FF)	Frederick Crowley (FF)	John Flynn (FF)	Thomas O'Reilly (FF)	Eamon Kissane (FF)	Fionán Lynch (CnaG)	John O'Sullivan (CnaG)
8th	1933	Tom McEllistrim (FF)	Frederick Crowley (FF)	John Flynn (FF)	Denis Daly (FF)	Eamon Kissane (FF)	Fionán Lynch (CnaG)	John O'Sullivan (CnaG)
9th	1937	Constituency abolished. See Kerry North and Kerry South						

Dáil	Election	Deputy (Party)	Deputy (Party)	Deputy (Party)	Deputy (Party)	Deputy (Party)
32nd	2016	Martin Ferris (SF)	Michael Healy-Rae (Ind.)	Danny Healy-Rae (Ind.)	John Brassil (FF)	Brendan Griffin (FG)
33rd	2020	Pa Daly (SF)	Michael Healy-Rae (Ind.)	Danny Healy-Rae (Ind.)	Norma Foley (FF)	Brendan Griffin (FG)
34th	2024	Pa Daly (SF)	Michael Healy-Rae (Ind.)	Danny Healy-Rae (Ind.)	Norma Foley (FF)	Michael Cahill (FF)
