= Con Collins =

Irish politician (1881–1937)

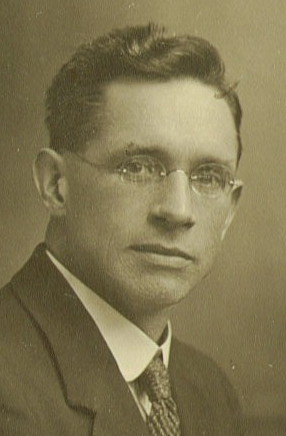
- Collins in 1923

Teachta Dála
- In office May 1921 – August 1923
- Constituency: Kerry–Limerick West
- In office December 1918 – May 1921
- Constituency: Limerick West

Personal details
- Born: Cornelius Collins; 13 November 1881 Newcastle West, County Limerick, Ireland
- Died: 23 November 1937 (aged 56) Dublin, Ireland
- Party: Sinn Féin

Cornelius Collins (Irish: Conchobhar Ó Coileáin; 13 November 1881 – 23 November 1937), known as Con Collins, was an Irish Sinn Féin politician.

He was born in Arranagh, Monagea, Newcastle West, County Limerick. He had joined the Gaelic League by 1910 when working in London for the civil service, as had Michael Collins the previous year. He was a member of the Irish Volunteers and of the Irish Republican Brotherhood. He and Austin Stack had been on their way to meet Sir Roger Casement at Banna Strand in County Kerry in 1916 when they were arrested by the British authorities on Easter Saturday. They spent Easter Week in Tralee Barracks and in solitary confinement on Spike Island, County Cork; they were then held with Terence MacSwiney, Arthur Griffith and others in Richmond Barracks before being sentenced to penal servitude for life. He was deported to Frongoch in Wales where he spent the rest of the year and much of 1917.

He was elected as a Sinn Féin MP for Limerick West at the 1918 general election. In January 1919, Sinn Féin MPs who had been elected in the Westminster elections of 1918 refused to recognise the Parliament of the United Kingdom and instead assembled at the Mansion House in Dublin as a revolutionary parliament called Dáil Éireann. At the 1921 Irish elections he was elected for the constituency of Kerry–Limerick West. He opposed the Anglo-Irish Treaty and voted against it.

He refused an offer of the Ministry for Posts and Telegraphs if he would switch to the pro-Treaty side. Having been sworn to non-violence – together with Richard Mulcahy – by the Augustinians, he did not join the anti-Treaty forces. He was again re-elected for Kerry–Limerick West at the 1922 general election, this time as anti-Treaty Sinn Féin Teachta Dála (TD). He did not contest the 1923 general election and retired from politics. He died in Dublin in 1937, aged 56, and is buried in Mount St. Lawrence cemetery, Limerick.

He and Piaras Béaslaí share a distinction in that they contested and were elected in three Irish general elections unopposed by any other candidates.

== See also ==
- List of members of the Oireachtas imprisoned during the Irish revolutionary period

Parliament of the United Kingdom
Preceded by Patrick O'Shaughnessy	Member of Parliament for Limerick West; 1918–1922	Constituency abolished
Oireachtas
New constituency	Teachta Dála for Limerick West; 1918–1921	Constituency abolished

Dáil	Election	Deputy (Party)	Deputy (Party)	Deputy (Party)	Deputy (Party)	Deputy (Party)	Deputy (Party)	Deputy (Party)	Deputy (Party)
2nd	1921	Piaras Béaslaí (SF)	James Crowley (SF)	Fionán Lynch (SF)	Patrick Cahill (SF)	Con Collins (SF)	Thomas O'Donoghue (SF)	Edmund Roche (SF)	Austin Stack (SF)
3rd	1922	Piaras Béaslaí (PT-SF)	James Crowley (PT-SF)	Fionán Lynch (PT-SF)	Patrick Cahill (AT-SF)	Con Collins (AT-SF)	Thomas O'Donoghue (AT-SF)	Edmund Roche (AT-SF)	Austin Stack (AT-SF)
4th	1923	Constituency abolished. See Kerry and Limerick							
