= Jeremiah Sheehan =

Irish nationalist politician

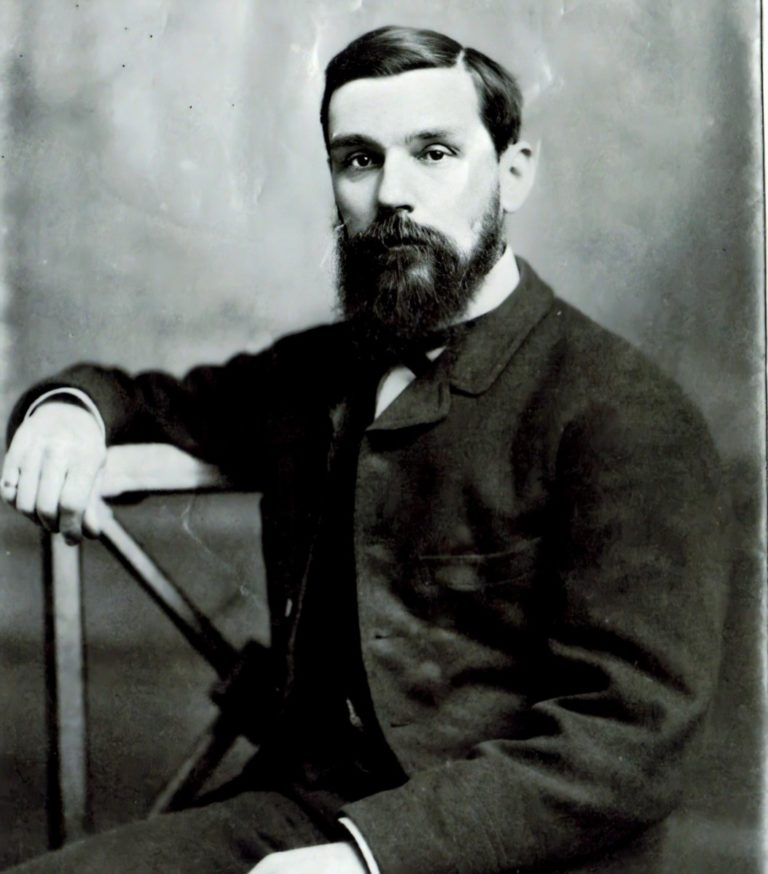
Jeremiah Sheehan, MP for East Kerry, 1885–1895

Jeremiah Daniel Sheehan (1847 – 1929) was an Irish nationalist politician. He was Member of Parliament (MP) for East Kerry from 1885 to 1895, taking his seat in the Parliament of the United Kingdom of Great Britain and Ireland.

Sheehan first stood for election to the House of Commons as an Irish Parliamentary Party candidate at the 1885 general election, when he won the new East Kerry seat with over 99% of the votes. (His sole opponent, a Conservative candidate won only 30 of the 3199 votes cast). He was returned unopposed in 1886. When the Irish Parliamentary Party split in 1891, he sided with the Anti-Parnellite majority, joining the Irish National Federation. At the 1892 general election he held against a Unionist opponent, winning over 90% of the votes.

At the 1895 general election, Sheehan did not stand again, and was succeeded as MP for East Kerry by Michael Davitt.

Parliament of the United Kingdom
New constituency	Member of Parliament for East Kerry; 1885 – 1895	Succeeded by Michael Davitt
