= Thomas O'Donoghue =

Irish politician (1889–1958)

Teachta Dála
- In office August 1923 – June 1927
- Constituency: Kerry
- In office May 1921 – August 1923
- Constituency: Kerry–Limerick West

Personal details
- Born: 7 October 1889 Cahersiveen, County Kerry, Ireland
- Died: 15 March 1958 (aged 68) Ballsbridge, Dublin, Ireland
- Party: Sinn Féin
- Occupation: Irish language teacher, Civil servant

Thomas Joseph O'Donoghue (7 October 1889 – 15 March 1958) was an Irish Sinn Féin politician from Cahersiveen, County Kerry. He was elected unopposed as a Sinn Féin Teachta Dála (TD) to the Second Dáil at the 1921 elections for the Kerry–Limerick West constituency.

He opposed the Anglo-Irish Treaty and voted against it. He was re-elected unopposed as an anti-Treaty Sinn Féin TD to the 3rd Dáil at the 1922 general election though he did not take his seat. He was re-elected at the 1923 general election for the Kerry constituency and again did not take his seat. He did not stand at the June 1927 general election.

| Dáil | Election | Deputy (Party) | Deputy (Party) | Deputy (Party) | Deputy (Party) | Deputy (Party) | Deputy (Party) | Deputy (Party) | Deputy (Party) |
|---|---|---|---|---|---|---|---|---|---|
| 2nd | 1921 | Piaras Béaslaí (SF) | James Crowley (SF) | Fionán Lynch (SF) | Patrick Cahill (SF) | Con Collins (SF) | Thomas O'Donoghue (SF) | Edmund Roche (SF) | Austin Stack (SF) |
| 3rd | 1922 | Piaras Béaslaí (PT-SF) | James Crowley (PT-SF) | Fionán Lynch (PT-SF) | Patrick Cahill (AT-SF) | Con Collins (AT-SF) | Thomas O'Donoghue (AT-SF) | Edmund Roche (AT-SF) | Austin Stack (AT-SF) |
| 4th | 1923 | Constituency abolished. See Kerry and Limerick | | | | | | | |

| Dáil | Election | Deputy (Party) | Deputy (Party) | Deputy (Party) | Deputy (Party) | Deputy (Party) | Deputy (Party) | Deputy (Party) |
|---|---|---|---|---|---|---|---|---|
| 4th | 1923 | Tom McEllistrim (Rep) | Austin Stack (Rep) | Patrick Cahill (Rep) | Thomas O'Donoghue (Rep) | James Crowley (CnaG) | Fionán Lynch (CnaG) | John O'Sullivan (CnaG) |
| 5th | 1927 (Jun) | Tom McEllistrim (FF) | Austin Stack (SF) | William O'Leary (FF) | Thomas O'Reilly (FF) | James Crowley (CnaG) | Fionán Lynch (CnaG) | John O'Sullivan (CnaG) |
| 6th | 1927 (Sep) | Tom McEllistrim (FF) | Frederick Crowley (FF) | William O'Leary (FF) | Thomas O'Reilly (FF) | James Crowley (CnaG) | Fionán Lynch (CnaG) | John O'Sullivan (CnaG) |
| 7th | 1932 | Tom McEllistrim (FF) | Frederick Crowley (FF) | John Flynn (FF) | Thomas O'Reilly (FF) | Eamon Kissane (FF) | Fionán Lynch (CnaG) | John O'Sullivan (CnaG) |
| 8th | 1933 | Tom McEllistrim (FF) | Frederick Crowley (FF) | John Flynn (FF) | Denis Daly (FF) | Eamon Kissane (FF) | Fionán Lynch (CnaG) | John O'Sullivan (CnaG) |
| 9th | 1937 | Constituency abolished. See Kerry North and Kerry South | | | | | | |

| Dáil | Election | Deputy (Party) | Deputy (Party) | Deputy (Party) | Deputy (Party) | Deputy (Party) |
|---|---|---|---|---|---|---|
| 32nd | 2016 | Martin Ferris (SF) | Michael Healy-Rae (Ind.) | Danny Healy-Rae (Ind.) | John Brassil (FF) | Brendan Griffin (FG) |
| 33rd | 2020 | Pa Daly (SF) | Michael Healy-Rae (Ind.) | Danny Healy-Rae (Ind.) | Norma Foley (FF) | Brendan Griffin (FG) |
| 34th | 2024 | Pa Daly (SF) | Michael Healy-Rae (Ind.) | Danny Healy-Rae (Ind.) | Norma Foley (FF) | Michael Cahill (FF) |
