= Kerry–Limerick West =

Dáil constituency (1921–1923)

- Former Dáil constituency
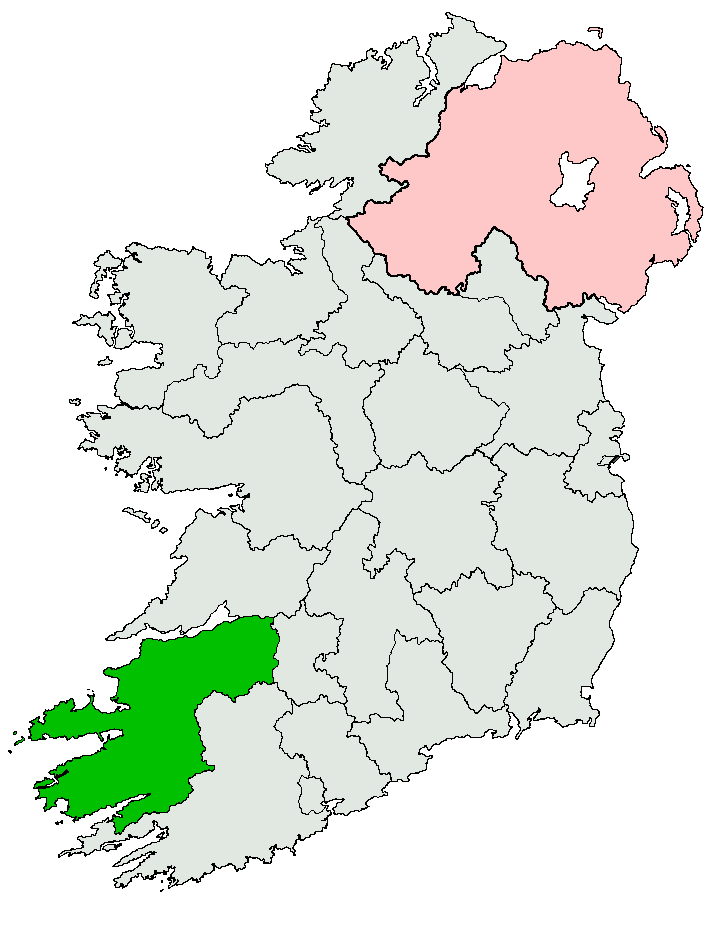
- Location of Kerry–Limerick West within Ireland

Former constituency
- Created: 1921
- Abolished: 1923
- Seats: 8
- Local government area: County Kerry; County Limerick
- Created from: East Kerry; North Kerry; South Kerry; West Kerry; West Limerick
- Replaced by: Kerry; Limerick

Kerry–Limerick West was a parliamentary constituency represented in Dáil Éireann, the lower house of the Irish parliament or Oireachtas from 1921 to 1923. The constituency elected 8 deputies (Teachtaí Dála, commonly known as TDs) to the Dáil, on the system of proportional representation by means of the single transferable vote (PR-STV).

== History ==
The constituency was created under the Government of Ireland Act 1920 to elect members to the House of Commons of Southern Ireland and first used at the 1921 general election to return the members of the 2nd Dáil. It succeeded four United Kingdom House of Commons constituencies in Kerry and the constituency of West Limerick which in 1918 were used to elect the members of the 1st Dáil.

It was abolished under the Electoral Act 1923 and succeeded by the new Kerry constituency and the Limerick constituency, both of which were first used at the 1923 general election for the 4th Dáil.

Both elections held in this constituency were uncontested.

== Boundaries ==
The constituency covered all of County Kerry and the western parts of County Limerick.

== TDs ==
Teachtaí Dála (TDs) for Kerry–Limerick West 1921–1923
Key to parties: SF = Sinn Féin; AT-SF = Sinn Féin (Anti-Treaty); PT-SF = Sinn Féin (Pro-Treaty)
Dáil	Election	Deputy (Party)	Deputy (Party)	Deputy (Party)	Deputy (Party)	Deputy (Party)	Deputy (Party)	Deputy (Party)	Deputy (Party)
2nd	1921	Piaras Béaslaí (SF)	James Crowley (SF)	Fionán Lynch (SF)	Patrick Cahill (SF)	Con Collins (SF)	Thomas O'Donoghue (SF)	Edmund Roche (SF)	Austin Stack (SF)
3rd	1922	Piaras Béaslaí (PT-SF)	James Crowley (PT-SF)	Fionán Lynch (PT-SF)	Patrick Cahill (AT-SF)	Con Collins (AT-SF)	Thomas O'Donoghue (AT-SF)	Edmund Roche (AT-SF)	Austin Stack (AT-SF)
4th	1923	Constituency abolished. See Kerry and Limerick							

Note: The columns in this table are used only for presentational purposes, and no significance should be attached to the order of columns. For details of the order in which seats were won at each election, see the detailed results of that election.

== Elections ==
*: Outgoing TD

=== 1922 general election ===
1922 general election: Kerry–Limerick West (uncontested)
Party	Candidate
Sinn Féin (Pro-Treaty)	Piaras Béaslaí
Sinn Féin (Anti-Treaty)	Patrick Cahill
Sinn Féin (Anti-Treaty)	Con Collins
Sinn Féin (Pro-Treaty)	James Crowley
Sinn Féin (Pro-Treaty)	Fionán Lynch
Sinn Féin (Anti-Treaty)	Thomas O'Donoghue
Sinn Féin (Anti-Treaty)	Edmund Roche
Sinn Féin (Anti-Treaty)	Austin Stack
Electorate: 90,397

=== 1921 general election ===
1921 general election: Kerry–Limerick West (uncontested)
Party	Candidate
Sinn Féin	Piaras Béaslaí
Sinn Féin	Patrick Cahill
Sinn Féin	Con Collins
Sinn Féin	James Crowley
Sinn Féin	Fionán Lynch
Sinn Féin	Thomas O'Donoghue
Sinn Féin	Edmund Roche
Sinn Féin	Austin Stack

== See also ==
- Dáil constituencies
- Politics of the Republic of Ireland
- Historic Dáil constituencies
- Elections in the Republic of Ireland
