= 1896 East Kerry by-election =

By-election in East Kerry, Ireland

The 1896 East Kerry by-election was held on 27 March 1896 due to the incumbent MP, Michael Davitt of the Irish National Federation also standing in South Mayo and taking that seat so leaving East Kerry vacant.

The Nationalists had split into two factions after the party leader, Charles Stewart Parnell was named as co-respondent in a divorce. James Roche was supported initially by both the Parnellites and the Anti-Parnellites, until it was revealed that he was himself divorced. During the campaign, Roche denied publicly that he knew of the divorce or that he had deserted his wife and children. It was thought Roche lost some support because as a divorced man he was less popular with the Catholic vote. Although he went on to win the seat, the opposing Unionist candidate gained the highest vote ever recorded for a Unionist candidate in Kerry East.

Roche served one term and did not stand in the following general election in 1900.

East Kerry by-election, 27 March 1896
Party	Candidate	Votes	%	±%
Irish National Federation	James Roche	1,961	74.2	N/A
Irish Unionist	Capt John McGillycuddy	680	25.7	New
Majority		1,281	48.5	N/A
Turnout		2,641	46.9	N/A
Irish National Federation hold		Swing	N/A	
