= Timothy O'Sullivan (Irish nationalist politician) =

Timothy O'Sullivan (7 January 1879 – 5 August 1950) was an Irish nationalist politician who was Member of Parliament (MP) for East Kerry from December 1910 to 1918, taking his seat in the House of Commons of what was then the United Kingdom of Great Britain and Ireland.

The East Kerry seat had been won at the January 1910 general election by his cousin Eugene O'Sullivan, who had been unseated in June by an electoral court which found that he had used intimidation to win the election. No by-election was called, and the seat remained vacant until the December 1910 general election, when Timothy O'Sullivan was elected as an Irish Parliamentary Party candidate. He won the seat with 66% of the votes, defeating the All-for-Ireland League candidate Patrick Guiney. (Guiney had been MP for North Cork since January 1910, and contested two constituencies in the December elections. He returned for North Cork).

O'Sullivan did not stand at the 1918 general election, when Piaras Béaslaí of Sinn Féin was elected unopposed.

Parliament of the United Kingdom
Vacant Title last held by Eugene O'Sullivan	Member of Parliament for East Kerry; December 1910 – 1918	Succeeded by Piaras Béaslaí
