= Pa Daly =

Irish politician

Pa Daly TD
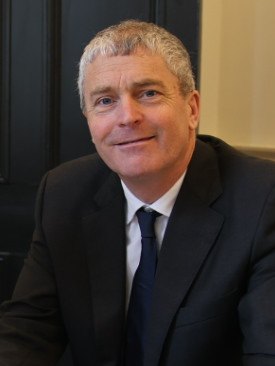
- Daly in 2024

Teachta Dála
- Incumbent
- Assumed office February 2020
- Constituency: Kerry

Personal details
- Born: Patrick Daly; 1969/1970 (age 55–56) Tralee, County Kerry, Ireland
- Party: Sinn Féin
- Spouse: Mary Ross
- Children: 4

Patrick Daly (born 1969/1970) is an Irish Sinn Féin politician who has been a Teachta Dála (TD) for the Kerry constituency since the 2020 general election.

He qualified as a solicitor in 1996, he worked in the United States before moving to Dublin. He returned to Tralee, establishing his own solicitor's practice.

Daly is married to Mary Ross, and they have four children. He is involved with local soccer and GAA clubs as well as the Tralee Parkrun.

He is also a founding member of Tralee Right to Water. He was a member of Kerry County Council for the Tralee local electoral area from 2014 to 2020, and previously a member of Tralee Town Council from 2012 to 2014.

He is also a member of the Education and Training Board, Bord Bainistíochta of Gaelcholáiste Chiarraí.

At the 2024 general election, Daly was re-elected to the Dáil. He was appointed party spokesperson for Climate, Environment, Energy and Transport in the Sinn Féin Front Bench.

Dáil	Election	Deputy (Party)	Deputy (Party)	Deputy (Party)	Deputy (Party)	Deputy (Party)	Deputy (Party)	Deputy (Party)
4th	1923	Tom McEllistrim (Rep)	Austin Stack (Rep)	Patrick Cahill (Rep)	Thomas O'Donoghue (Rep)	James Crowley (CnaG)	Fionán Lynch (CnaG)	John O'Sullivan (CnaG)
5th	1927 (Jun)	Tom McEllistrim (FF)	Austin Stack (SF)	William O'Leary (FF)	Thomas O'Reilly (FF)	James Crowley (CnaG)	Fionán Lynch (CnaG)	John O'Sullivan (CnaG)
6th	1927 (Sep)	Tom McEllistrim (FF)	Frederick Crowley (FF)	William O'Leary (FF)	Thomas O'Reilly (FF)	James Crowley (CnaG)	Fionán Lynch (CnaG)	John O'Sullivan (CnaG)
7th	1932	Tom McEllistrim (FF)	Frederick Crowley (FF)	John Flynn (FF)	Thomas O'Reilly (FF)	Eamon Kissane (FF)	Fionán Lynch (CnaG)	John O'Sullivan (CnaG)
8th	1933	Tom McEllistrim (FF)	Frederick Crowley (FF)	John Flynn (FF)	Denis Daly (FF)	Eamon Kissane (FF)	Fionán Lynch (CnaG)	John O'Sullivan (CnaG)
9th	1937	Constituency abolished. See Kerry North and Kerry South						

Dáil	Election	Deputy (Party)	Deputy (Party)	Deputy (Party)	Deputy (Party)	Deputy (Party)
32nd	2016	Martin Ferris (SF)	Michael Healy-Rae (Ind.)	Danny Healy-Rae (Ind.)	John Brassil (FF)	Brendan Griffin (FG)
33rd	2020	Pa Daly (SF)	Michael Healy-Rae (Ind.)	Danny Healy-Rae (Ind.)	Norma Foley (FF)	Brendan Griffin (FG)
34th	2024	Pa Daly (SF)	Michael Healy-Rae (Ind.)	Danny Healy-Rae (Ind.)	Norma Foley (FF)	Michael Cahill (FF)
