= West Limerick (UK Parliament constituency) =

Former parliamentary constituency in the United Kingdom

- Former county constituency for the House of Commons

1885–1922
- Seats: 1
- Created from: County Limerick
- Replaced by: Kerry–Limerick West

West Limerick was a UK Parliament constituency in Ireland, returning one Member of Parliament from 1885 to 1922.

Prior to the 1885 United Kingdom general election the area was part of the County Limerick constituency. Representation at Westminster in this constituency ceased at the 1922 United Kingdom general election, which took place on 15 November, shortly before the establishment of the Irish Free State on 6 December 1922.

== Boundaries ==
This constituency comprised the western part of County Limerick.

1885–1922: The baronies of Connello Lower, Connello Upper, Glenquin, Kenry and Shanid, and that part of the barony of Coshma contained within the parishes of Adare, Drehidtarsna and Killonohan.

== Members of Parliament ==
| Election | Member | Party | Note |
|---|---|---|---|
| 1885, December 1 | William Abraham | Irish Parliamentary | Party split |
| 1890, December ^{1} | William Abraham | Anti-Parnellite | Joined new organisation |
| 1891, March ^{1} | William Abraham | Irish National Federation | |
| 1892, July 13 | Michael Austin | Irish National Federation | |
| 1900, October 5 | Patrick O'Shaughnessy | Irish Parliamentary | |
| 1918, December 14 ^{2} | Con Collins | Sinn Féin | Did not take his seat at Westminster |
| 1922, October 26 | UK constituency abolished | | |

Notes:-

- ^{1} Not an election, but the date of a party change. The Irish Parliamentary Party had been created in 1882, on the initiative of Charles Stewart Parnell's Irish National League. Both the IPP and the INL split into Parnellite and Anti-Parnellite factions, in December 1890. The Parnellites remained members of the Irish National League after the split and the Anti-Parnellites organised the Irish National Federation in March 1891. The two organisations and the United Irish League merged in 1900, to re-create the Irish Parliamentary Party.
- ^{2} Date of polling day. The result was declared on 28 December 1918, to allow time for votes cast by members of the armed forces to be included in the count.

== Elections ==
=== Elections in the 1880s ===
1885 general election: West Limerick
| Party | Candidate | Votes | % | ±% |
|---|---|---|---|---|
| Irish Parliamentary | William Abraham | Unopposed | | |
| Irish Parliamentary win (new seat) | | | | |

1886 general election: West Limerick
| Party | Candidate | Votes | % | ±% |
|---|---|---|---|---|
| Irish Parliamentary | William Abraham | Unopposed | | |
| Irish Parliamentary hold | | | | |

=== Elections in the 1890s ===
1892 general election: West Limerick
| Party | Candidate | Votes | % | ±% |
|---|---|---|---|---|
| Irish National Federation | Michael Austin | 3,257 | 86.3 | N/A |
| Irish National League | Henry Harrison | 516 | 13.7 | N/A |
| Majority | | 2,741 | 72.6 | N/A |
| Turnout | | 3,773 | 53.0 | N/A |
| Registered electors | | 7,118 | | |
| Irish National Federation gain from Irish Parliamentary | | Swing | N/A | |

1895 general election: West Limerick
| Party | Candidate | Votes | % | ±% |
|---|---|---|---|---|
| Irish National Federation | Michael Austin | Unopposed | | |
| Irish National Federation hold | | | | |

=== Elections in the 1900s ===
1900 general election: West Limerick
| Party | Candidate | Votes | % | ±% |
|---|---|---|---|---|
| Irish Parliamentary | Patrick O'Shaughnessy | Unopposed | | |
| Irish Parliamentary hold | | | | |

1906 general election: West Limerick
| Party | Candidate | Votes | % | ±% |
|---|---|---|---|---|
| Irish Parliamentary | Patrick O'Shaughnessy | Unopposed | | |
| Irish Parliamentary hold | | | | |

=== Elections in the 1910s ===
January 1910 general election: West Limerick
| Party | Candidate | Votes | % | ±% |
|---|---|---|---|---|
| Irish Parliamentary | Patrick O'Shaughnessy | Unopposed | | |
| Irish Parliamentary hold | | | | |

December 1910 general election: West Limerick
| Party | Candidate | Votes | % | ±% |
|---|---|---|---|---|
| Irish Parliamentary | Patrick O'Shaughnessy | 3,052 | 70.4 | N/A |
| All-for-Ireland | D. D. Sheehan | 1,285 | 29.6 | N/A |
| Majority | | 1,767 | 40.8 | N/A |
| Turnout | | 4,337 | 57.4 | N/A |
| Registered electors | | 7,550 | | |
| Irish Parliamentary hold | | Swing | N/A | |

1918 general election: West Limerick
| Party | Candidate | Votes | % | ±% |
|---|---|---|---|---|
| Sinn Féin | Con Collins | Unopposed | | |
| Sinn Féin gain from Irish Parliamentary | | | | |
