= John Murphy (Irish Parliamentary Party politician) =

Irish politician

John Murphy (1870 – 17 April 1930) was an Irish nationalist politician. He was Member of Parliament (MP) for East Kerry from 1900 to 1910, taking his seat in the United Kingdom House of Commons.

Murphy was first elected to Parliament at the general election in October 1900 when he was returned unopposed as a candidate of the Irish Parliamentary Party. He was re-elected at the 1906 general election, with a narrow majority of 54 votes over rival nationalist candidate Eugene O'Sullivan. However, at the next general election, in January 1910, O'Sullivan won the seat with a majority of 489 votes (10%).

Murphy then launched an electoral petition, claiming that the vote had been rigged and that O'Sullivan had only won through violence and intimidation. The court cleared O'Sullivan of vote rigging but found him guilty of intimidation. The election was declared void, unseating O'Sullivan and creating a vacancy, but no by-election was called before the December 1910 general election. Murphy did not stand again.

Parliament of the United Kingdom
Preceded by James Roche	Member of Parliament for East Kerry; 1900 – January 1910	Succeeded by Eugene O'Sullivan
