= Elizabeth Mernin =

Elizabeth "Lily" Mernin
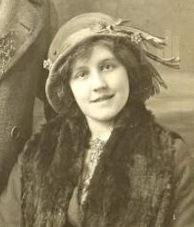
- Born: 16 November 1886; Dungarvan, County Waterford
- Died: 18 February 1957 (aged 70); Dublin
- Occupation: intelligence agent
- Known for: work under her alias "Little Gentleman"

Elizabeth "Lily" Mernin (16 November 1886 – 18 February 1957) was an Irish intelligence agent known as the "Little Gentleman" or "Lt. G.".

== Life ==
Elizabeth Mernin was born in Dungarvan, County Waterford on 16 November 1886. Her parents were John Mernin and Mary (née McGuire). She had one sister, May. Her father was a baker and confectioner in Waterford. After his death when Mernin was young, the children were raised by his family in Dungarvan.

In the 1910s, Mernin worked as a typist in a number of Dublin companies, and by 1914 she was a shorthand typist in Dublin Castle at the garrison adjutant's office. She was a member of the Keating branch of the Gaelic League, and through this her cousin, Piaras Béaslaí, introduced her to Michael Collins in 1918. From 1919 she began working for Collins as an intelligence agent. She used her position in Dublin Castle to obtain important documents and, in 1920, intelligence on British intelligence officers and the auxiliary police.

Under the alias of "Little Gentleman" or "Lt. G.", she was one of Collins' most important agents, so much so that many believed the Little Gentleman was a British intelligence officer. One of the most important contributions Mernin made was identifying the homes of British intelligence officers who were later killed on Bloody Sunday, 21 November 1920, by Collins' squad. She aided Frank Saurin and Tom Cullen in identifying senior British agents in Dublin, typing secret reports for Collins in a room in 19 Clonliffe Road.

In February 1922, she was discharged from the British service, taking up a position as a typist in the Irish Army from July 1922 until February 1952, when she retired. She worked primarily at Clancy Barracks. Mernin was awarded a military pension for her service from 1918-1922, and her statement is held in the Bureau of Military History in the Military Archives.

Mernin never married, although she gave birth to a son in London in June 1922, with some evidence suggesting Béaslaí was the father. She lived at 167 Mangerton Road, Drimnagh. She died on 18 February 1957 in Dublin aged 70.
