= East Kerry (UK Parliament constituency) =

Former parliamentary constituency in the United Kingdom

- Former county constituency for the House of Commons

1885–1922
- Seats: 1
- Created from: County Kerry
- Replaced by: Kerry–Limerick West

East Kerry was a UK Parliament constituency in Ireland, returning one Member of Parliament from 1885 to 1922.

Prior to the 1885 United Kingdom general election the area was part of the County Kerry constituency. Representation at Westminster in this constituency ceased at the 1922 United Kingdom general election, which took place on 15 November, shortly before the establishment of the Irish Free State on 6 December 1922. The successor constituency in the new Dáil Éireann was Kerry–Limerick West first established under the Government of Ireland Act 1920 to elect members to the House of Commons of Southern Ireland in 1921.

== Boundaries ==
This constituency comprised the eastern part of County Kerry.

1885–1922: The barony of Magunihy and that part of the barony of Trughanacmy not included in the constituency of West Kerry.

== Members of Parliament ==
Election	Member	Party
1885	Jeremiah Sheehan	Irish Parliamentary Party
1891	Jeremiah Sheehan	Irish National Federation
1895	Michael Davitt (Note: At the 1895 general election, Michael Davitt was also elected for South Mayo, and chose to sit for that seat. The East Kerry seat remained vacant until a by-election was held on 27 March 1896)	Irish National Federation
1895	vacant	
1896	The Hon James Roche	Irish National Federation
1900	John Murphy	Irish Parliamentary Party
1910 (January)	Eugene O'Sullivan	Irish Parliamentary Party (Note: Eugene O'Sullivan was elected as an Independent Nationalist but two days after beating the IPP John Murphy, he announced that he would join the IPP.)
1910 (June)	vacant (Note: After the general election in January 1910, John Murphy launched an election petition, alleging intimidation and irregularities at the election. The petition was heard in June 1910, at Killarney before Mr. Justices Madden and Kenny. After a hearing of 7 days the judges found for Murphy, and O'Sullivan was unseated. However, the Irish Parliamentary Party failed to move the writ for a by-election, and the seat remained vacant until the December 1910 general election.)	
1910 (December)	Timothy O'Sullivan	Irish Parliamentary Party
1918	Piaras Béaslaí	Sinn Féin
1922	constituency abolished	

== Elections ==
=== Elections in the 1880s ===
1885 general election: East Kerry
Party	Candidate	Votes	%	±%
Irish Parliamentary	Jeremiah Sheehan	3,169	99.1	
Irish Conservative	Charles Henry de Grey Robertson	30	0.9	
Majority		3,139	98.2^{1}	
Turnout		3,199	53.6	
Registered electors		5,971		
Irish Parliamentary win (new seat)				

^{1} This remains the largest majority by percentage of the vote in any contested UK Parliamentary election.

1886 general election: East Kerry
Party	Candidate	Votes	%	±%
Irish Parliamentary	Jeremiah Sheehan	Unopposed		
Irish Parliamentary hold				

=== Elections in the 1890s ===
1892 general election: East Kerry
Party	Candidate	Votes	%	±%
Irish National Federation	Jeremiah Sheehan	2,600	91.1	N/A
Irish Unionist	John McGillycuddy	253	8.9	New
Majority		2,347	82.2	N/A
Turnout		2,853	48.5	N/A
Registered electors		5,885		
Irish National Federation gain from Irish Parliamentary		Swing	N/A	

1895 general election: East Kerry
Party	Candidate	Votes	%	±%
Irish National Federation	Michael Davitt	Unopposed		
Irish National Federation hold				

Davitt also stood unopposed in South Mayo. He took up the South Mayo seat and Kerry East remained vacant until the by-election the following year.

James Roche was returned but with fewer votes than his Nationalist predecessors. It was thought he lost some support because as a divorced man he was less popular with the Catholic vote.

East Kerry by-election, 27 March 1896
Party	Candidate	Votes	%	±%
Irish National Federation	James Roche	1,961	74.2	N/A
Irish Unionist	John McGillycuddy	680	25.7	New
Majority		1,281	48.5	N/A
Turnout		2,641	46.9	N/A
Registered electors		5,629		
Irish National Federation hold		Swing	N/A	

=== Elections in the 1900s ===
1900 general election: East Kerry
Party	Candidate	Votes	%	±%
Irish Parliamentary	John Murphy	Unopposed		
Irish Parliamentary hold				

In the closely fought contest of the 1906 election between two nationalist factions, Murphy was returned by a narrow margin:

1906 general election: East Kerry
Party	Candidate	Votes	%	±%
Irish Parliamentary	John Murphy	2,185	50.6	N/A
Ind. Nationalist	Eugene O'Sullivan	2,131	49.4	New
Majority		54	1.2	N/A
Turnout		4,316	76.9	N/A
Registered electors		5,611		
Irish Parliamentary hold		Swing	N/A	

=== Elections in the 1910s ===
In the January 1910 election, the incumbent Murphy (Official Nationalist) was beaten by Independent candidate, Eugene O'Sullivan, who was a follower of William O'Brien's All-for-Ireland League. Shortly after being elected, O'Sullivan re-joined the official Nationalists, but Murphy petitioned the courts claiming that the vote had been rigged and that O'Sullivan had only won through violence and intimidation. The court cleared O'Sullivan of vote rigging but found him guilty of intimidation. The election was declared void, unseating O'Sullivan and creating a vacancy.

January 1910 general election: East Kerry
Party	Candidate	Votes	%	±%
Ind. Nationalist	Eugene O'Sullivan	2,643	55.1	+5.7
Irish Parliamentary	John Murphy	2,154	44.9	−5.7
Majority		489	10.2	N/A
Turnout		4,797	83.2	+6.3
Registered electors		5,766		
Ind. Nationalist gain from Irish Parliamentary		Swing	+5.7	

In the December 1910 election, Eugene O'Sullivan's cousin, Timothy O'Sullivan, stood for the Nationalists. The All-for-Ireland candidate, Patrick Guiney, contested both this seat and North Cork. Although he lost in East Kerry, he was elected unopposed in North Cork, so both candidates became Members of Parliament, albeit for different constituencies. As earlier in the year, the election was marred by election violence, which included a riot at Castleisland.

December 1910 general election: East Kerry
Party	Candidate	Votes	%	±%
Irish Parliamentary	Timothy O'Sullivan	2,561	66.2	+21.3
All-for-Ireland	Patrick Guiney	1,308	33.8	New
Majority		1,253	32.4	N/A
Turnout		3,869	67.1	−16.1
Registered electors		5,766		
Irish Parliamentary gain from Ind. Nationalist		Swing		

1918 general election: East Kerry
Party	Candidate	Votes	%	±%
Sinn Féin	Piaras Béaslaí	Unopposed		
Sinn Féin gain from Irish Parliamentary				

In accordance with his party's policy, Béaslaí declined to take his seat in the British House of Commons, sitting instead in the Irish revolutionary assembly, Dáil Éireann.
