= Eugene O'Sullivan (Irish politician) =

Irish politician and farmer

Eugene O'Sullivan (1879 – 19 May 1942) was an Irish nationalist politician and farmer, who was elected Member of Parliament (MP) for East Kerry in January 1910, but was unseated on petition shortly afterwards.

== Sporting career ==
Joining the Dr Crokes club in the 1890s as a playing member he captained the great club team which won the 1901 Kerry Senior Football Championship and up to 1905 was a regular member. He played with and captained the Kerry team 1902–1904 and was also a regular member of the Killarney hurling team.

In 1903 he was elected chairman of the Kerry Co. Board and under his guidance for the next five years the Co. Board was very active and the Kerry footballers broke through for national recognition. In 1904 while chairman of the county board, representative to Central and Munster council and playing with Dr. Crokes, he was opposed on the Listowel team by T.F O’Sullivan (secretary of the Co. Board and also a delegate to Central Council and Munster Council.) Eugene kept an interest in the G.A.A. right up to his death in 1942. He was vice-president and then president of the Dr. Croke club. He was chairman of the Fitzgerald Memorial committee which brought to fruition the erection of the stadium to the memory of the great Dick Fitzgerald.

== Political career ==
O'Sullivan first stood for election to the House of Commons at the 1906 general election, when he fell only 54 votes short of unseating the sitting Irish Parliamentary Party MP, John Murphy. However, at the next election, in January 1910, O'Sullivan stood as an independent nationalist, and won the seat with a majority 489 votes (10% of the poll). Despite being elected as an independent, O'Sullivan chose to immediately join the Irish Parliamentary Party, and took his seat in the Parliament of the United Kingdom of Great Britain and Ireland. His ten contributions to proceedings related to land issues and old-age pensions.

The defeated member, Murphy, launched an election petition, alleging intimidation and irregularities at the election. The petition was heard in June 1910, at Killarney before Mr. Justices Madden and Kenny. After 7 days of hearings the judges found for Murphy, and O'Sullivan was unseated. However, the Nationalists failed to move the writ for a by-election, and the seat remained vacant until the December 1910 general election, at which O'Sullivan's cousin, Timothy O'Sullivan, held the seat for the Irish Parliamentary Party.

The following year, Killarney Urban District Council elected O'Sullivan as its chairman, by right of which under the Local Government (Ireland) Act 1898 he was appointed a justice of the peace. The prompted Dermot Bourke, 7th Earl of Mayo to complain in the House of Lords that someone removed as MP was unfit to be a justice of the peace.

Sporting positions
Preceded by Thady O'Gorman	Kerry Senior Football Captain; 1902	Succeeded by Thady O'Gorman
Parliament of the United Kingdom
Preceded by John Murphy	Member of Parliament for East Kerry; Jan. 1910 – Jun. 1910	Succeeded by Timothy O'Sullivan
