= Tom McEllistrim =

Tom McEllistrim may refer to:

- Tom McEllistrim (1894–1973), Fianna Fáil TD for Kerry/Kerry North 1923–1969
- Tom McEllistrim (1926–2000), Fianna Fáil TD for Kerry North 1969–1987 and 1989–1992
- Tom McEllistrim (born 1968), Fianna Fáil TD for Kerry North 2002–2011
