= John Lynch (Kerry politician) =

Irish politician (1889–1957)

Senator
- In office 22 July 1954 – 22 May 1957
- Constituency: Industrial and Commercial Panel

Teachta Dála
- In office May 1951 – May 1954
- Constituency: Kerry North

Personal details
- Born: 10 April 1889 Kilflynn, County Kerry, Ireland
- Died: 10 June 1957 (aged 68) Listowel, County Kerry, Ireland
- Party: Fine Gael

John Lynch (10 April 1889 – 10 June 1957) was an Irish businessman and Fine Gael politician who served as a Senator for the Industrial and Commercial Panel from 1954 to 1957 and a Teachta Dála (TD) for the Kerry North constituency from 1951 to 1954.

From the Stack's Mountains area near Kilflynn, County Kerry, Lynch was the owner of a bakery business in Listowel. He was elected to both Kerry County Council and Listowel Urban District Council before being chosen as a Dáil candidate. Lynch was unexpectedly elected to Dáil Éireann on his first attempt, at the 1951 general election, as a Fine Gael candidate for the Kerry North constituency taking his seat in the 14th Dáil. He took the seat of Eamon Kissane, sitting Fianna Fáil TD for North Kerry.

At the 1954 general election, he lost his seat to the Clann na Poblachta candidate Johnny Connor, but was then elected to the 8th Seanad on the Industrial and Commercial Panel, where he served until 1957.

He stood again as a candidate for Dáil Éireann at the 1957 general election, but was unsuccessful. Clann na Poblachta had not put forward a candidate, and the seat was won by a Fianna Fáil candidate, Daniel Moloney. Lynch did not contest the subsequent election to the 9th Seanad, and died suddenly at his business premises in June 1957.

Lynch had fought in the Irish War of Independence and as an officer in the pro-treaty National Army and was buried with full military honours.

Dáil	Election	Deputy (Party)	Deputy (Party)	Deputy (Party)	Deputy (Party)
9th	1937	Stephen Fuller (FF)	Tom McEllistrim, Snr (FF)	John O'Sullivan (FG)	Eamon Kissane (FF)
10th	1938	Stephen Fuller (FF)	Tom McEllistrim, Snr (FF)	John O'Sullivan (FG)	Eamon Kissane (FF)
11th	1943	Dan Spring (Lab)	Tom McEllistrim, Snr (FF)	Patrick Finucane (CnaT)	Eamon Kissane (FF)
12th	1944	Dan Spring (NLP)	Tom McEllistrim, Snr (FF)	Patrick Finucane (CnaT)	Eamon Kissane (FF)
13th	1948	Dan Spring (NLP)	Tom McEllistrim, Snr (FF)	Patrick Finucane (CnaT)	Eamon Kissane (FF)
14th	1951	Dan Spring (Lab)	Tom McEllistrim, Snr (FF)	Patrick Finucane (Ind.)	John Lynch (FG)
15th	1954	Dan Spring (Lab)	Tom McEllistrim, Snr (FF)	Patrick Finucane (CnaT)	Johnny Connor (CnaP)
15th	1956 by-election	Dan Spring (Lab)	Tom McEllistrim, Snr (FF)	Patrick Finucane (CnaT)	Kathleen O'Connor (CnaP)
16th	1957	Dan Spring (Lab)	Tom McEllistrim, Snr (FF)	Patrick Finucane (Ind.)	Daniel Moloney (FF)
17th	1961	Dan Spring (Lab)	Tom McEllistrim, Snr (FF)	Patrick Finucane (Ind.)	3 seats from 1961
18th	1965	Dan Spring (Lab)	Tom McEllistrim, Snr (FF)	Patrick Finucane (Ind.)	3 seats from 1961
19th	1969	Dan Spring (Lab)	Gerard Lynch (FG)	Tom McEllistrim, Jnr (FF)	3 seats from 1961
20th	1973	Dan Spring (Lab)	Gerard Lynch (FG)	Tom McEllistrim, Jnr (FF)	3 seats from 1961
21st	1977	Dan Spring (Lab)	Kit Ahern (FF)	Tom McEllistrim, Jnr (FF)	3 seats from 1961
22nd	1981	Dick Spring (Lab)	Denis Foley (FF)	Tom McEllistrim, Jnr (FF)	3 seats from 1961
23rd	1982 (Feb)	Dick Spring (Lab)	Denis Foley (FF)	Tom McEllistrim, Jnr (FF)	3 seats from 1961
24th	1982 (Nov)	Dick Spring (Lab)	Denis Foley (FF)	Tom McEllistrim, Jnr (FF)	3 seats from 1961
25th	1987	Dick Spring (Lab)	Denis Foley (FF)	Jimmy Deenihan (FG)	3 seats from 1961
26th	1989	Dick Spring (Lab)	Tom McEllistrim, Jnr (FF)	Jimmy Deenihan (FG)	3 seats from 1961
27th	1992	Dick Spring (Lab)	Denis Foley (FF)	Jimmy Deenihan (FG)	3 seats from 1961
28th	1997	Dick Spring (Lab)	Denis Foley (FF)	Jimmy Deenihan (FG)	3 seats from 1961
29th	2002	Martin Ferris (SF)	Tom McEllistrim (FF)	Jimmy Deenihan (FG)	3 seats from 1961
30th	2007	Martin Ferris (SF)	Tom McEllistrim (FF)	Jimmy Deenihan (FG)	3 seats from 1961
31st	2011	Constituency abolished. See Kerry North–West Limerick			
