= Patrick Finucane =

Patrick Finucane may refer to:

- Pat Finucane (1949–1989), Belfast solicitor killed by loyalist paramilitaries in 1989
  - Pat Finucane Centre, Northern Irish nationalist advocacy and lobbying entity
- Patrick Finucane (Irish politician) (1890–1984), Irish Clann na Talmhan TD for Kerry North
- Paddy Finucane, World War II RAF officer killed in 1942
