= Arthur Spring =

Irish former politician (born 1976)

Teachta Dála
- In office February 2011 – February 2016
- Constituency: Kerry North–West Limerick

Personal details
- Born: 5 July 1976 (age 50) Tralee, County Kerry, Ireland
- Party: Labour Party
- Relatives: Dan Spring (grandfather); Dick Spring (uncle)
- Education: Dublin Institute of Technology

Arthur Spring (born 5 July 1976) is an Irish former Labour Party politician who served as a Teachta Dála (TD) for the Kerry North–West Limerick constituency from 2011 to 2016.

He is a nephew of Dick Spring, a former TD for Kerry North and Labour Party leader, and grandson of Labour TD Dan Spring. He was educated at the Dublin Institute of Technology.

Spring was elected to Kerry County Council and Tralee Town Council in 2009, and is a former Mayor of Tralee. He was elected as a Labour Party TD for Kerry North–West Limerick at the 2011 general election. The constituency was abolished at the 2016 general election. Spring stood for election in Kerry but did not succeed. His brother, Graham Spring, was a member of Kerry County Council from 2014 to 2019.

== See also ==
- Families in the Oireachtas

| Dáil | Election | Deputy (Party) | Deputy (Party) | Deputy (Party) |
|---|---|---|---|---|
| 31st | 2011 | Arthur Spring (Lab) | Martin Ferris (SF) | Jimmy Deenihan (FG) |
| 32nd | 2016 | Constituency abolished. See Kerry and Limerick County | | |
