= Kit Ahern =

Irish politician (1915–2007)

- Ahern in 1971

Teachta Dála
- In office June 1977 – June 1981
- Constituency: Kerry North

Senator
- In office 5 November 1969 – 25 May 1977
- Constituency: Cultural and Educational Panel
- In office 23 October 1964 – 5 November 1969
- Constituency: Nominated by the Taoiseach

Personal details
- Born: Catherine Ita Liston; 13 January 1915 Athea, County Limerick, Ireland
- Died: 27 December 2007 (aged 92) Tralee, County Kerry, Ireland
- Party: Fianna Fáil
- Other political affiliations: Progressive Democrats
- Spouse: Dan Ahern (m. 1941; died 1974)
- Children: 3
- Relatives: Eoin Liston (nephew); Ned O'Sullivan (cousin)
- Education: College of Art

Catherine Ita Ahern (née Liston; 13 January 1915 – 27 December 2007) was an Irish Fianna Fáil politician who served as a Teachta Dála (TD) for the Kerry North constituency from 1977 to 1981 and a Senator from 1964 to 1977. Ahern was the first woman to hold several political offices, such as first woman to chair Kerry County Council. At the 1977 general election she was one of only three women elected to the 21st Dáil.

A member of Fianna Fáil, during the 1970s and 1980s Ahern exemplified the convergence of Irish nationalism and social conservatism that was growing in the party at the time, supporting the functional use of the Irish language while opposing contraception, divorce, annulment and women with children working outside the home. In the 1979 Fianna Fáil leadership election, she supported the failed attempt by George Colley and thereafter fell afoul of his successful rival Charles Haughey, who prevented her from returning to the Seanad by favouring others. Starved of political support within Haughey's Fianna Fáil, she retired from national politics by the mid-1980s. Her Parthian shot was to defect to the newly created Progressive Democrats in 1985, a splinter party from Fianna Fáil filled with many of Haughey's opponents.

== Early life and career ==
She was born in Athea, County Limerick, the eldest of eight children. She grew up in a politically conscientious household: Her father, Patrick Liston, was known as "the Painter" because he painted banners for Parnellite rallies while her grandmother Kate McAuliffe had been involved in the Ladies' Land League. During the Irish Civil War the Listons supported the Anti-Treaty IRA and from then onwards were considered staunch Irish Republicans. Ahern's uncle Owen McAuliffe was a member of the Limerick IRA and was imprisoned for his activities.

Ahern's first political activity was in about 1934 when she and another classmate walked out of the classroom at her school to protest against other classmates wearing blue shirts in support of the Army Comrades Association.

Ahern was educated locally and at the College of Art in Dublin, and went on to work as a teacher at Coláiste Mhuire in Abbeyfeale, County Limerick. Ahern became involved with the Irish Countrywomen's Association (ICA), becoming the organisation's president in 1961, and she also served on the board of Bord Fáilte.

== Political career ==
Ahern's first major political role came in 1964, when she was nominated to Seanad Éireann by the Taoiseach, Seán Lemass, to fill a vacancy caused by the death of Pádraig Ó Siochfhradha.

Ahern contested the Dáil elections of 1965, 1969 and 1973, but was unsuccessful on all three occasions. However, she retained her Seanad seat, initially as a Taoiseach's nominee, and in 1969 and 1973 she was elected as a Senator for the Cultural and Educational Panel. After her re-election in 1973, she was nominated by Fianna Fáil Senator Brian Lenihan for the post of Leas-Chathaoirleach of the 13th Seanad. The post had traditionally been held by a member of an opposition party, but the incoming National Coalition government of Fine Gael and the Labour Party decided that it wanted a Labour Party deputy to a Fine Gael Cathaoirleach James Dooge. Labour's Evelyn Owens was elected as Leas-Chathaoirleach, but Ahern won the support not just of her Fianna Fáil colleagues but also of Mary Robinson then an independent senator.

Ahern became a member of Kerry County Council in 1967, and from 1977 to 1978 she was the council's first woman Cathaoirleach (chairperson).

Dáil success came for Ahern following Fianna Fáil's landslide victory at the 1977 general election, when she was elected as a TD for Kerry North. It was also the first time that two Fianna Fáil TDs had been elected in the Kerry North constituency, the other deputy being Tom McEllistrim. Ahern only served one term as in Dáil Éireann, as she lost her seat at the 1981 general election. The loss of her seat as a TD crippled Ahern's political career; having supported the failed bid of George Colley in the 1979 Fianna Fáil leadership election, Ahern did not enjoy the support of his successful rival Charles Haughey. Haughey did not return Ahern to the Seanad, instead choosing a member of his own faction, Denis Foley, over her. When Haughey didn't nominate her for the Seanad after the February 1982 Irish general election, it was clear his position had been cemented and that Ahern was now frozen out within Fianna Fáil. Ahern felt embittered, believing that over the course of her 13 years in the Seanad she had built up considerable new support for Fianna Fáil in Kerry, only for her to be simply discarded by Haughey due to internal politics. Not seeing a future for her political career, Ahern retired from national politics. Nonetheless, in 1985 Ahern joined the Progressive Democrats, a splinter party from Fianna Fáil led by an Haughey archrival Desmond O'Malley.

== Political views and profile ==
Over the course of her political career, Ahern combined Irish nationalism/Irish republicanism with social conservatism, paralleling the trends within Fianna Fáil in the 1970s and 1980s. Ahern was a lifelong supporter of the Irish language and an active member of Conradh na Gaeilge. During her tenure as President of Irish Countrywomen's Association, she encouraged the use of Irish during meetings. As ICA President, Ahern declared herself the first "Peasant President" of the organisation and cultivated an image of herself as a rural upstart as opposed to her supposed middle-class urbanite predecessors.

Ahern was able to successfully use her presidency as a stepping stone into political office, despite the fact that the ICA's constitution forbade members from engaging in politics. Ahern retorted that it would be hypocritical for her to reject a nomination to the Seanad having previously advocated for women to become more politically active. On her entry to the Seanad, Ahern declared she took the role "as a tribute to the women of Ireland, as a tribute to myself and to try to create a base for a new North Kerry Fianna Fáil TD".

Despite being the first woman to hold a number of political offices and one of the most prominent women in Irish politics in her era, Ahern was considered highly conservative, particularly on issues relating to women. Ahern opposed contraception, divorce and even annulment of marriage. Ahern opposed the creation of crèches for women in politics, and instead advocated that women should give up politics to become full-time mothers if they became pregnant. Following a report by the Commission on the Status of Women in 1973, Ahern remarked "I have very decided ideas of women's role in life and in my own county the women are doing a great job of work in the keeping their going and directing and bring up their families. This, I think, is what almighty God intended them to do".

Speaking in 2004, Ahern stated retroactively that “Jack Lynch and Des O’Malley were my two heroes in politics. I was in Dublin the night they threw Dessie out. Men of outstanding integrity. Only for Jack Lynch keeping his cool on the Northern issue in 1968, we would have had a civil war, no doubt about that.”

== Personal life ==
She died in Tralee in December 2007, aged almost 93. In 1941, she married Dan Ahern, a national school teacher, who died in 1974. They had three children. Her cousin, Fianna Fáil Senator Ned O'Sullivan described Ahern as a highly principled woman, and said that "Kit Ahern had more integrity in her little finger than most of us have in our entire bodies".

Ahern was a lifelong promoter of the Irish language and the aunt of Kerry Gaelic footballer Eoin Liston. She was also President of the Kerry Archaeological and Historical Society.

Dáil	Election	Deputy (Party)	Deputy (Party)	Deputy (Party)	Deputy (Party)
9th	1937	Stephen Fuller (FF)	Tom McEllistrim, Snr (FF)	John O'Sullivan (FG)	Eamon Kissane (FF)
10th	1938	Stephen Fuller (FF)	Tom McEllistrim, Snr (FF)	John O'Sullivan (FG)	Eamon Kissane (FF)
11th	1943	Dan Spring (Lab)	Tom McEllistrim, Snr (FF)	Patrick Finucane (CnaT)	Eamon Kissane (FF)
12th	1944	Dan Spring (NLP)	Tom McEllistrim, Snr (FF)	Patrick Finucane (CnaT)	Eamon Kissane (FF)
13th	1948	Dan Spring (NLP)	Tom McEllistrim, Snr (FF)	Patrick Finucane (CnaT)	Eamon Kissane (FF)
14th	1951	Dan Spring (Lab)	Tom McEllistrim, Snr (FF)	Patrick Finucane (Ind.)	John Lynch (FG)
15th	1954	Dan Spring (Lab)	Tom McEllistrim, Snr (FF)	Patrick Finucane (CnaT)	Johnny Connor (CnaP)
15th	1956 by-election	Dan Spring (Lab)	Tom McEllistrim, Snr (FF)	Patrick Finucane (CnaT)	Kathleen O'Connor (CnaP)
16th	1957	Dan Spring (Lab)	Tom McEllistrim, Snr (FF)	Patrick Finucane (Ind.)	Daniel Moloney (FF)
17th	1961	Dan Spring (Lab)	Tom McEllistrim, Snr (FF)	Patrick Finucane (Ind.)	3 seats from 1961
18th	1965	Dan Spring (Lab)	Tom McEllistrim, Snr (FF)	Patrick Finucane (Ind.)	3 seats from 1961
19th	1969	Dan Spring (Lab)	Gerard Lynch (FG)	Tom McEllistrim, Jnr (FF)	3 seats from 1961
20th	1973	Dan Spring (Lab)	Gerard Lynch (FG)	Tom McEllistrim, Jnr (FF)	3 seats from 1961
21st	1977	Dan Spring (Lab)	Kit Ahern (FF)	Tom McEllistrim, Jnr (FF)	3 seats from 1961
22nd	1981	Dick Spring (Lab)	Denis Foley (FF)	Tom McEllistrim, Jnr (FF)	3 seats from 1961
23rd	1982 (Feb)	Dick Spring (Lab)	Denis Foley (FF)	Tom McEllistrim, Jnr (FF)	3 seats from 1961
24th	1982 (Nov)	Dick Spring (Lab)	Denis Foley (FF)	Tom McEllistrim, Jnr (FF)	3 seats from 1961
25th	1987	Dick Spring (Lab)	Denis Foley (FF)	Jimmy Deenihan (FG)	3 seats from 1961
26th	1989	Dick Spring (Lab)	Tom McEllistrim, Jnr (FF)	Jimmy Deenihan (FG)	3 seats from 1961
27th	1992	Dick Spring (Lab)	Denis Foley (FF)	Jimmy Deenihan (FG)	3 seats from 1961
28th	1997	Dick Spring (Lab)	Denis Foley (FF)	Jimmy Deenihan (FG)	3 seats from 1961
29th	2002	Martin Ferris (SF)	Tom McEllistrim (FF)	Jimmy Deenihan (FG)	3 seats from 1961
30th	2007	Martin Ferris (SF)	Tom McEllistrim (FF)	Jimmy Deenihan (FG)	3 seats from 1961
31st	2011	Constituency abolished. See Kerry North–West Limerick			
