= Gerard Lynch (Irish politician) =

Irish politician (1931–2025)

Senator
- In office 27 October 1977 – 8 October 1981
- Constituency: Agricultural Panel

Teachta Dála
- In office June 1969 – June 1977
- Constituency: Kerry North

Personal details
- Born: 15 June 1931 Tralee, County Kerry, Ireland
- Died: 20 December 2025 (aged 94) County Kerry, Ireland
- Party: Fine Gael
- Spouse: Margot Lynch (m. 1953)
- Children: 10

Gerard Michael Lynch (15 June 1931 – 20 December 2025) was an Irish Fine Gael politician who served as a senator for the Agricultural Panel from 1977 to 1981 and a Teachta Dála (TD) for the Kerry North constituency from 1969 to 1977.

A baker and farmer by profession, he was elected to Dáil Éireann at the 1969 general election. He was re-elected at the 1973 general election, but lost his Dáil seat at the 1977 general election. He was subsequently elected to the 14th Seanad Éireann as a senator for the Agricultural Panel. He was an unsuccessful candidate at the 1981 general election.

Lynch died on 20 December 2025, at the age of 94.

Dáil	Election	Deputy (Party)	Deputy (Party)	Deputy (Party)	Deputy (Party)
9th	1937	Stephen Fuller (FF)	Tom McEllistrim, Snr (FF)	John O'Sullivan (FG)	Eamon Kissane (FF)
10th	1938	Stephen Fuller (FF)	Tom McEllistrim, Snr (FF)	John O'Sullivan (FG)	Eamon Kissane (FF)
11th	1943	Dan Spring (Lab)	Tom McEllistrim, Snr (FF)	Patrick Finucane (CnaT)	Eamon Kissane (FF)
12th	1944	Dan Spring (NLP)	Tom McEllistrim, Snr (FF)	Patrick Finucane (CnaT)	Eamon Kissane (FF)
13th	1948	Dan Spring (NLP)	Tom McEllistrim, Snr (FF)	Patrick Finucane (CnaT)	Eamon Kissane (FF)
14th	1951	Dan Spring (Lab)	Tom McEllistrim, Snr (FF)	Patrick Finucane (Ind)	John Lynch (FG)
15th	1954	Dan Spring (Lab)	Tom McEllistrim, Snr (FF)	Patrick Finucane (CnaT)	Johnny Connor (CnaP)
15th	1956 by-election	Dan Spring (Lab)	Tom McEllistrim, Snr (FF)	Patrick Finucane (CnaT)	Kathleen O'Connor (CnaP)
16th	1957	Dan Spring (Lab)	Tom McEllistrim, Snr (FF)	Patrick Finucane (Ind)	Daniel Moloney (FF)
17th	1961	Dan Spring (Lab)	Tom McEllistrim, Snr (FF)	Patrick Finucane (Ind)	3 seats from 1961
18th	1965	Dan Spring (Lab)	Tom McEllistrim, Snr (FF)	Patrick Finucane (Ind)	3 seats from 1961
19th	1969	Dan Spring (Lab)	Gerard Lynch (FG)	Tom McEllistrim, Jnr (FF)	3 seats from 1961
20th	1973	Dan Spring (Lab)	Gerard Lynch (FG)	Tom McEllistrim, Jnr (FF)	3 seats from 1961
21st	1977	Dan Spring (Lab)	Kit Ahern (FF)	Tom McEllistrim, Jnr (FF)	3 seats from 1961
22nd	1981	Dick Spring (Lab)	Denis Foley (FF)	Tom McEllistrim, Jnr (FF)	3 seats from 1961
23rd	1982 (Feb)	Dick Spring (Lab)	Denis Foley (FF)	Tom McEllistrim, Jnr (FF)	3 seats from 1961
24th	1982 (Nov)	Dick Spring (Lab)	Denis Foley (FF)	Tom McEllistrim, Jnr (FF)	3 seats from 1961
25th	1987	Dick Spring (Lab)	Denis Foley (FF)	Jimmy Deenihan (FG)	3 seats from 1961
26th	1989	Dick Spring (Lab)	Tom McEllistrim, Jnr (FF)	Jimmy Deenihan (FG)	3 seats from 1961
27th	1992	Dick Spring (Lab)	Denis Foley (FF)	Jimmy Deenihan (FG)	3 seats from 1961
28th	1997	Dick Spring (Lab)	Denis Foley (FF)	Jimmy Deenihan (FG)	3 seats from 1961
29th	2002	Martin Ferris (SF)	Tom McEllistrim (FF)	Jimmy Deenihan (FG)	3 seats from 1961
30th	2007	Martin Ferris (SF)	Tom McEllistrim (FF)	Jimmy Deenihan (FG)	3 seats from 1961
31st	2011	Constituency abolished. See Kerry North–West Limerick			
