= Ned O'Sullivan =

Irish former politician (born 1950)

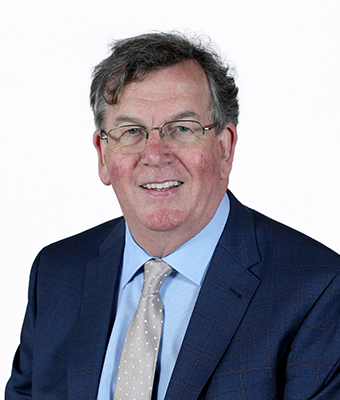

Senator
- In office 13 September 2007 – 31 January 2025
- Constituency: Labour Panel

Personal details
- Born: 25 November 1950 (age 75) Listowel, County Kerry, Ireland
- Party: Fianna Fáil
- Spouse: Madeleine Murphy (m. 1987)
- Children: 3
- Relatives: Kit Ahern (cousin)
- Education: University College Dublin; St Patrick's College, Dublin

Ned O'Sullivan (born 25 November 1950) is an Irish former Fianna Fáil politician who served as a Senator for the Labour Panel from July 2007 to January 2025.

He was a member of Listowel Town Council from 1985 to 2007 and Kerry County Council from 1991 to 2007. He was an unsuccessful Fianna Fáil candidate in the Kerry North constituency at the 1989 Irish general election and at the 1992 general election.

He was educated at University College Dublin and St Patrick's College of Education, Drumcondra, he worked as a teacher at primary and secondary level in Dublin, Offaly and Kerry before taking over his family's menswear business in Listowel. He was a cousin of Kit Ahern, who served as a TD and Senator.

In December 2008, he sent silk ties (worth €25 each) to approximately 400 County councillors. He was the Fianna Fáil Seanad spokesperson on Transport, Sport, Tourism and Sport. In June 2011, it was revealed that 3,600 premium line votes from a phone in Leinster House at a cost of €2,600 to the Irish taxpayer helped Michael Healy-Rae win Celebrities Go Wild in 2007. O'Sullivan admitted making "around a dozen" calls and texts to support Healy-Rae after being asked to do so by Healy-Rae's campaign manager.

He did not contest the 2025 Seanad election.
