= Donal Spring =

Irish rugby union player

- Full name: Donal Eugene Spring
- Born: 23 August 1956 (age 70) Tralee, County Kerry, Ireland
- Height: 6 ft 5 in (196 cm)

Rugby union career
- Position: Lock / No. 8
International career
Years	Team	Apps	(Points)
1978–81	Ireland	7	(0)

Donal Eugene Spring (born 23 August 1956) is an Irish solicitor and former rugby union international.

Born in Tralee, County Kerry, Spring is the youngest son of Labour Party politician Dan Spring, who was a footballer in his youth for Kerry GAA. One of his elder brothers, Dick Spring, was capped three times for Ireland as a fullback and became a long serving Labour Party leader. All three brothers attended Cistercian College, Roscrea.

Spring, a forward, appeared 16 times for Munster and was the number eight when in 1978 they became the first Irish team to defeat the All Blacks. As both a lock and number eight, he was capped seven times for Ireland from 1979 to 1981, largely while with Dublin University. He was a club captain of Lansdowne, where he played in three Leinster Senior Cup and four Leinster Senior League wins, across two stints. In between, he played club rugby in France for Bagnérais.

Qualified as a solicitor since 1982, Spring is the Principal of Dublin firm Daniel Spring & Co. Solicitors. Spring is also a racehorse owner and breeder - in 2023 he won the Flying Five Stakes with his horse Moss Tucker, named after his Munster team-mates Moss Keane and Colm Tucker.

== See also ==
- List of Ireland national rugby union players
