= Kerry North–West Limerick =

Dáil constituency (2011–2016)

- Former Dáil constituency
- Location of Kerry North–West Limerick within Ireland

Former constituency
- Created: 2011
- Abolished: 2016
- Seats: 3
- Local government areas: County Kerry; County Limerick
- Created from: Kerry North; Limerick West
- Replaced by: Kerry; Limerick County

Kerry North–West Limerick was a parliamentary constituency represented in Dáil Éireann, the house of representatives of the Oireachtas (the Irish parliament), for a single Dáil term, from 2011 to 2016. The constituency elected 3 deputies (Teachtaí Dála, commonly known as TDs). The method of election was proportional representation by means of the single transferable vote (PR-STV).

== History and boundaries ==
The Constituency Commission proposed in 2007 that at the next general election the constituency of Kerry North be renamed as Kerry North–West Limerick, with the transfer of certain electoral divisions from Limerick West and other electoral divisions to Kerry South.

It was established by the Electoral (Amendment) Act 2009. It was only used at the 2011 general election.

The constituency comprised the northern half of County Kerry, located between the River Shannon estuary and the Slieve Mish Mountains; taking in Tralee, Listowel, Tarbert, Ballybunion and Castleisland; and the western part of County Limerick taking in the town of Abbeyfeale; and the villages of Athea, Glin, Mountcollins, Templeglantine and Tournafulla.

The 2009 Act defined the constituency as:

"In the county of Kerry the electoral divisions of:

Ardagh, Astee, Ballincloher, Ballyconry, Ballyduff, Ballyegan, Ballyhorgan, Beal, Carrig, Causeway, Cloontubbrid, Drommartin, Duagh, Ennismore, Gullane, Gunsborough, Kilfeighny, Killehenny, Killury, Kilmeany, Kilshenane, Kiltomy, Leitrim, Lislaughtin, Lisselton, Listowel Rural, Lixnaw, Moynsha, Newtownsandes, Rathea, Shronowen, Tarbert, Tarmon, Trienearagh, Urlee, in the former Rural District of Listowel;
Abbeydorney, Arabela, Ardfert, Ballyegan, Ballyheige, Ballynahaglish, Ballynorig, Ballyseedy, Banna, Blennerville, Brosna, Clogherbrien, Crinny, Doon, Gneeves, Kerryhead, Kilflyn, Killahan, Kilmurry, Knocknagashel, Lackabaun, Mount Eagle, Nohaval, O'Brennan, Ratass, Tralee Rural, Tubrid, in the former Rural District of Tralee;
and the towns of Listowel and Tralee;

and, in the county of Limerick, the electoral divisions of:

Fleanmore, Glin, Kilfergus, Kilmoylan, in the former Rural District of Glin;
Abbeyfeale, Ardagh, Caher, Dromtrasna, Garryduff, Glenagower, Glengort, Glensharrold, Monagay, Mountcollins, Port, Rathronan, Rooskagh, Templeglentan, in the former Rural District of Newcastle."

At the 2016 general election, it was superseded by the constituencies of Kerry and Limerick County.

== TDs ==
Teachtaí Dála (TDs) for Kerry North–West Limerick 2011–2016
Key to parties: FG = Fine Gael; Lab = Labour; SF = Sinn Féin
Dáil	Election	Deputy (Party)	Deputy (Party)	Deputy (Party)
31st	2011	Arthur Spring (Lab)	Martin Ferris (SF)	Jimmy Deenihan (FG)
32nd	2016	Constituency abolished. See Kerry and Limerick County		

Note: The columns in this table are used only for presentational purposes, and no significance should be attached to the order of columns. For details of the order in which seats were won at each election, see the detailed results of that election.

== Elections ==
*: Outgoing TD

=== 2011 general election ===
2011 general election: Kerry North–West Limerick
Party	Candidate	FPv%	Count						
Party	Candidate	FPv%	1	2	3	4	5	6	7
Fine Gael	Jimmy Deenihan	27.0	12,304						
Sinn Féin	Martin Ferris	20.3	9,282	9,440	9,489	9,540	9,784	10,164	11,416
Labour	Arthur Spring	20.1	9,159	9,415	9,514	9,571	9,947	10,685	12,245
Fine Gael	John Sheahan	13.8	6,295	6,677	6,726	6,781	6,892	7,142	8,044
Fianna Fáil	Tom McEllistrim	11.5	5,230	5,275	5,306	5,329	5,451	5,678	
Independent	Bridget O'Brien	3.2	1,455	1,477	1,521	1,577	1,950		
Independent	Mary Fitzgibbon	1.5	706	722	765	849			
Independent	Sam Locke	1.1	486	492	498	519			
New Vision	Mick Reidy (Note: New Vision was an electoral alliance of independent non-party candidates and did not appear on the ballot.)	0.8	357	362	373				
Green	Tom Donovan	0.5	239	247					
Independent	John McKenna	0.2	101	103					
Electorate: 63,614 Valid: 45,614 Spoilt: 413 (0.9%) Quota: 11,404 Turnout: 46,027 (72.4%)

== See also ==
- Elections in the Republic of Ireland
- Historic Dáil constituencies
- Politics of the Republic of Ireland
