= Dick Spring =

Irish former Labour Party leader (born 1950)

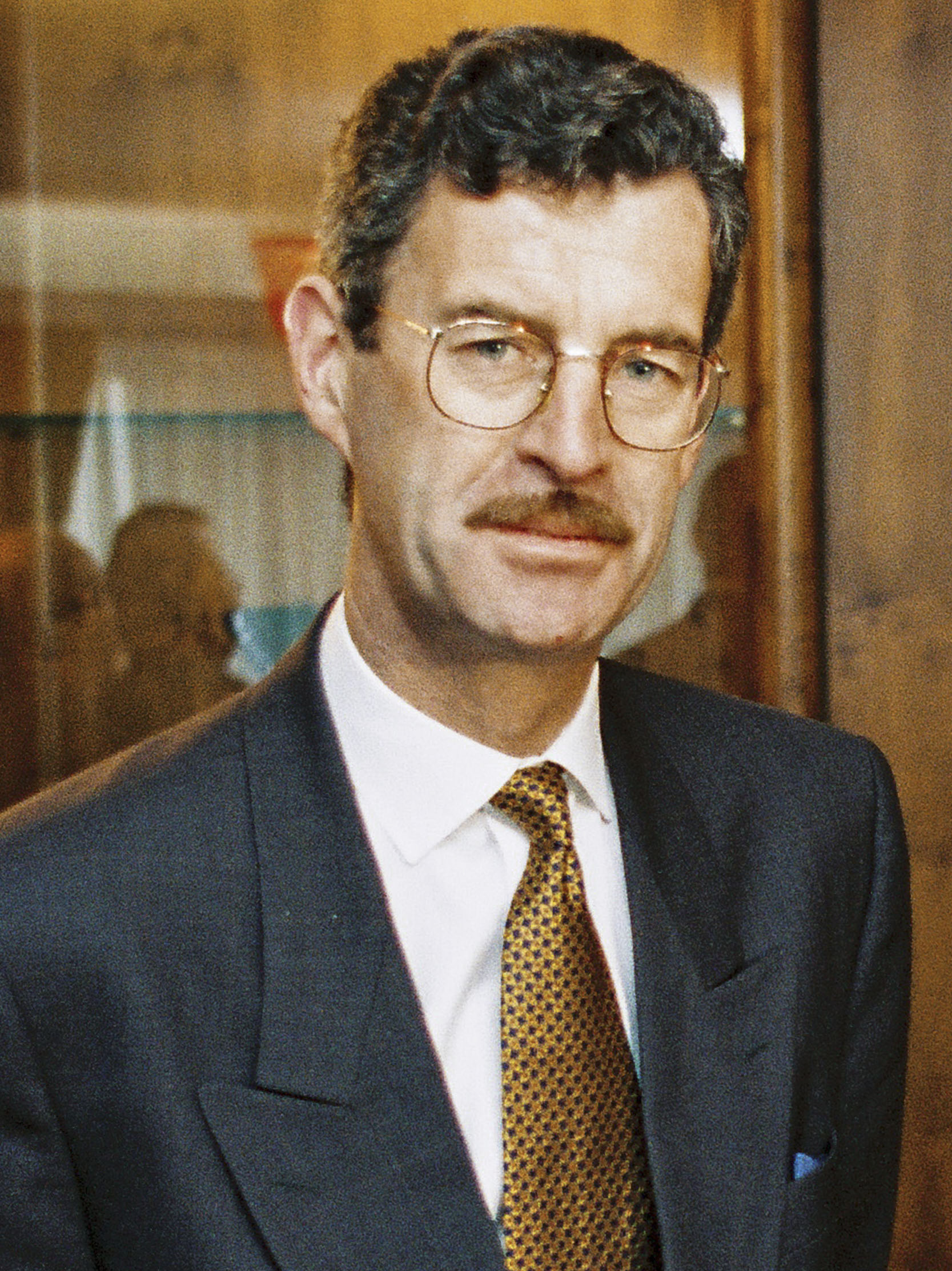
- Spring in 1995

Tánaiste
- In office 15 December 1994 – 26 June 1997
- Taoiseach: John Bruton
- Preceded by: Bertie Ahern
- Succeeded by: Mary Harney
- In office 12 January 1993 – 17 November 1994
- Taoiseach: Albert Reynolds
- Preceded by: John Wilson
- Succeeded by: Bertie Ahern
- In office 14 December 1982 – 20 January 1987
- Taoiseach: Garret FitzGerald
- Preceded by: Ray MacSharry
- Succeeded by: Peter Barry

Minister for Foreign Affairs
- In office 15 December 1994 – 26 June 1997
- Taoiseach: John Bruton
- Preceded by: Albert Reynolds
- Succeeded by: Ray Burke
- In office 12 January 1993 – 17 November 1994
- Taoiseach: Albert Reynolds
- Preceded by: David Andrews
- Succeeded by: Albert Reynolds

Leader of the Labour Party
- In office 1 November 1982 – 13 November 1997
- Deputy: Barry Desmond; Ruairi Quinn
- Preceded by: Michael O'Leary
- Succeeded by: Ruairi Quinn

Minister for the Environment
- In office 14 December 1982 – 13 December 1983
- Taoiseach: Garret FitzGerald
- Preceded by: Ray Burke
- Succeeded by: Liam Kavanagh

Minister of State
- 1981–1982: Justice

Teachta Dála
- In office June 1981 – May 2002
- Constituency: Kerry North

Personal details
- Born: Richard Martin Spring; 29 August 1950 (age 76) Tralee, County Kerry, Ireland
- Party: Labour Party
- Spouse: Kristi Hutcheson (m. 1978)
- Children: 3
- Parent: Dan Spring (father)
- Relatives: Donal Spring (brother); Arthur Spring (nephew)
- Education: Trinity College Dublin; King's Inns

Richard Martin Spring (born 29 August 1950) is an Irish former Labour Party politician who served as Tánaiste from 1982 to 1987, 1992 to November 1994, and December 1994 to 1997, Leader of the Labour Party from 1982 to 1997, Minister for Foreign Affairs from 1993 to November 1994 and December 1994 to 1997, Minister for Energy from 1983 to 1987, and Minister for the Environment from 1982 to 1983. He was a Teachta Dála (TD) for Kerry North from 1981 to 2002.

Before his political career, Spring was a successful sportsman who played for the Ireland national rugby union team and the Kerry GAA football and hurling teams.

== Early life ==
Spring was born in Tralee, County Kerry in 1950, the son of Dan and Anna Spring (née Laide). He was educated at Cistercian College in Roscrea, County Tipperary, and at Trinity College Dublin, and qualified as a barrister at the King's Inns. He is a descendant of the Anglo-Irish Spring family that settled in County Kerry in the late 16th century.

== Sporting career ==
Spring played Gaelic football and hurling for Kerry during the 1970s. He played his club football with the Kerins O'Rahilly's club in Tralee and hurling with Crotta O'Neill's; he also played underage hurling with Austin Stacks and won a minor county championship in 1967. His father Dan won two All-Ireland Senior Football Championships in 1939 and 1940.

He then won rugby union caps for Munster, and lined out for London Irish in the UK. He also was capped for Ireland three times during the 1979 Five Nations Championship, earning his first cap against France on 20 January 1979 at Lansdowne Road, and receiving his last international cap on 17 February 1979 against England at Lansdowne Road.

== Political career ==
=== Early career ===
Spring's political life began when he successfully contested the 1979 Kerry County Council election for the county electoral area of Tralee, succeeding his father Dan Spring TD on Kerry County Council that year. Spring senior had been a TD for Kerry North since 1943, mostly representing Labour, but he was a member of the National Labour Party from 1944 to 1950.

He was first elected to Dáil Éireann in the 1981 general election for the constituency of Kerry North, again succeeding his father. The Labour Party formed a coalition Government with Fine Gael and Spring was appointed a junior minister on his first day as a TD. In December 1981 Spring was involved in a car crash near Nenagh, County Tipperary that killed James Curran and left Spring with a lasting back injury. While in recovery, Spring appeared in the Dáil on a stretcher to vote, having been denied a pair.

=== Leadership ===
When Michael O'Leary resigned as party leader after the February 1982 general election, Spring allowed his name to go forward in the leadership contest. He defeated Barry Desmond and Michael D. Higgins, but inherited the leadership of a deeply divided party. Spring was a strong opponent of anti-coalition politics and systematically removed Trotskyist activists from the party. Most notably he expelled the Militant Tendency in 1989 (which later became Socialist Party), including Joe Higgins and Clare Daly.

=== Tánaiste (1982–1987) ===
Following the November 1982 general election Labour again formed a coalition government with Fine Gael. Spring was appointed Tánaiste and Minister for the Environment. In a reshuffle following the resignation from cabinet of former Labour leader Frank Cluskey in December 1983, Spring was appointed as Minister for Energy. He was closely involved in the negotiations which led to the Anglo-Irish Agreement in 1985. In January 1987, the Labour Party withdrew from the government on budgetary issues. At the 1987 general election, Spring narrowly escaped losing his seat when he was re-elected by just four votes. Fianna Fáil took office in a minority government after the election.

=== Opposition ===
The Labour Party selected Mary Robinson as its candidate in the 1990 presidential election. Robinson was elected, and this success enhanced the credibility of his leadership of the party. For Spring, his period in opposition coincided with the exposure of several business scandals and allowed him to shine as a critic of the Fianna Fáil government, led by Charles Haughey.

=== "Spring Tide" and return to power ===
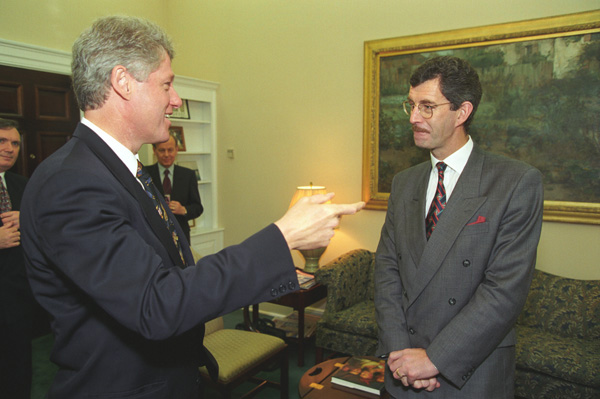
Spring with US President Bill Clinton in 1993

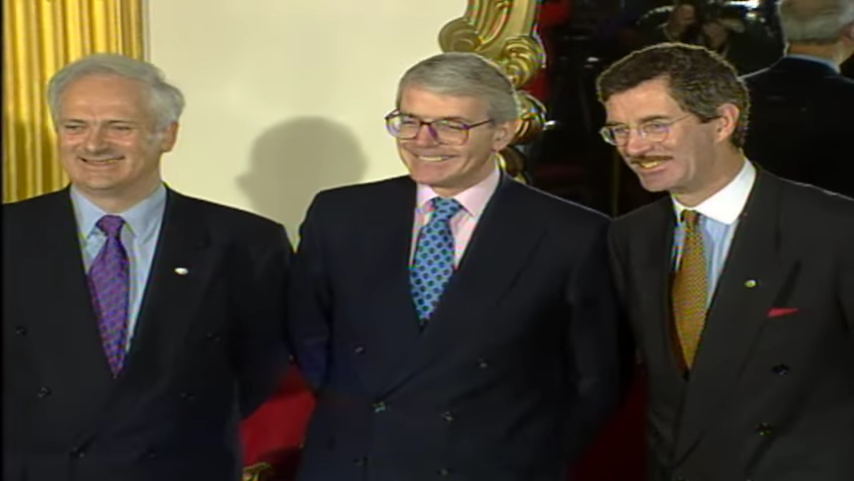
Spring with UK Prime Minister John Major and Taoiseach John Bruton in 1996

In the 1992 general election the party increased its number of Dáil seats from 15 to 33, its largest number of seats to that point, an achievement dubbed the "Spring Tide". After the election, no government was formed when the 27th Dáil met. After some weeks of stalemate, Spring entered negotiations with Albert Reynolds—who had taken over as Taoiseach from Haughey in February 1992—over the Christmas period on a new programme for government. This was approved by a special party conference of over 1,000 delegates at Dublin's National Concert Hall in January 1993, though there were some Labour Party TDs who dissented from the leadership position and wanted a coalition with Fine Gael. The Labour Party entered a coalition government with Fianna Fáil and thus returned Reynolds to power. Spring was appointed Tánaiste for the second time, and also as Minister for Foreign Affairs.

Labour took six of the fifteen cabinet ministries and had much of its election manifesto accepted by Fianna Fáil. Labour ministers led the new Departments of Equality and Law Reform and the reformed of Arts and Culture. Ethics legislation was to outlaw conflicts of interest. Male homosexual acts were to be decriminalised. The age restriction on the purchase of condoms was removed and condoms were permitted to be sold in vending machines. An extensive programme of family law reform and a commitment to a divorce referendum was to be undertaken. Spring insisted on a formalised system of programme managers, and state-paid advisers to push the new government's policy platform.

However support for the Labour Party declined, particularly as many voters felt betrayed by Labour for going into government with Fianna Fáil. In June 1994, the Labour Party performed disastrously in by-elections in Dublin South-Central and in Cork North-Central. In both cases, the seats were won by Democratic Left. This had grave implications for the electoral health of the party and therefore for the policy of the Labour leadership.

In late 1994, Reynolds wished to appoint the Attorney General, Harry Whelehan, as President of the High Court, but delayed for over a month. Spring had reservations about Whelehan being suitable, owing to the alleged laxity of his handling of an extradition request for disgraced Catholic priest and sex offender, Brendan Smyth. Reynolds for his part could not understand why Spring was against Whelehan being nominated to the High Court, and yet had no concerns with Whelehan serving as Attorney General. Reynolds became annoyed with Spring's stance, and his failure to communicate his reservations, and decided to proceed anyway, whilst calling Spring's bluff. Spring and the other Labour ministers withdrew from the cabinet meeting which proceeded to recommend Whelehan's appointment to the President. Immediately afterwards, Reynolds implemented the decision.

There followed a rather heated discussion in the Dáil, concerning the appointment. Fine Gael asked questions about Whelehan's suitability and objectivity. This was supportive of Spring's position. Democratic Left TD Pat Rabbitte then implied that the Catholic hierarchy was instructing Reynolds to appoint Whelehan. Reynolds became irate with this allegation and responded angrily. Reynolds now realised that Spring was uncompromising about Whelehan. To remain in government, Reynolds removed Whelehan; however, Spring refused to go back into government with Reynolds. Whelehan served as President of the High Court for one day.

Spring proceeded to withdraw from the government. The minority Reynolds government then lost a vote of confidence in the Dáil. Reynolds resigned as party leader but continued as a caretaker Taoiseach. Spring entered into negotiations with Reynolds' successor as party, Bertie Ahern, the Minister for Finance. In early December, they agreed to reform the Fianna Fáil–Labour Government. On the eve of that government being formed, The Irish Times published a report that Ahern knew more about an aspect of the scandal that had brought down Reynolds than had previously been known. Spring broke off negotiations with Fianna Fáil, and instead pursued negotiations to form a coalition with Fine Gael and Democratic Left. In December 1994, Fine Gael, Labour and Democratic Left formed a coalition government, referred to as the Rainbow Coalition, forestalling the possibility of an election. Spring returned to his positions as Tánaiste and Minister for Foreign Affairs. This was the first occasion on which a new Irish government was formed without a general election. The previous Fianna Fáil and Labour Programme for Government was substantially adopted by the new government and in return for making John Bruton the Taoiseach, Ruairi Quinn of Labour became the first-ever Labour Minister for Finance.

During his period as Foreign Minister, Spring played a role in the Northern Ireland peace process, and along with Reynolds was involved in negotiations leading to the Provisional Irish Republican Army and loyalist ceasefires of 1994. With Reynolds and Máire Geoghegan-Quinn, he received warm applause in the Dáil on the announcement of the Downing Street Declaration in December 1993. He also advanced Ireland's membership of the Partnership for Peace, a sister organisation of NATO, a controversial issue due to Ireland's policy of neutrality.

=== Resignation as party leader and defeat as TD ===
In the 1997 general election the Labour Party fell to 17 seats and returned to opposition. This was considered by some to be a punishment by the electorate for the 1993 decision to enter a coalition with Fianna Fáil. By others, it was considered a punishment for changing horses at the end of 1994, to remain in power. A front-page editorial in the Irish Independent on the day before the election, entitled "Payback Time" and calling on support for Fianna Fáil, had a direct and severe impact on the Labour Party. The Independent newspaper group had revealed many scandals involving Labour ministers abusing the perks of office in the year leading up to the election. The article was controversial because Spring had taken decisions in office which went against the broader business interests of the Independent's owner Anthony O'Reilly, who was accused by Labour supporters of having attempted to use his paper's political influence to intimidate the government into favouring companies linked to O'Reilly. The impact of the article is uncertain but the Labour Party suffered significant electoral losses and the outgoing coalition was defeated. In the presidential election of the same year the Labour Party candidate, Adi Roche, came fourth out of five candidates. Following that defeat, Spring resigned as Labour Party leader, having served 15 years — one of the longest-serving party leaders in Ireland.

He remained a TD, being appointed a director in the formerly state-owned recently privatised telecommunications company Eircom in 1999. Its initial flotation led to a stock market bubble which affected a large number of small shareholders. It was later revealed that he did not purchase shares in the company.

Spring lost his seat in a shock result at the 2002 general election. He has not sought political office since.

== Political legacy ==
In Irish political circles, the role of foreign minister was considered a poisoned chalice because of the challenge of resolving the delicate problem of how to de-escalate tensions in Northern Ireland, when both sides were wary of Irish governmental policy. Albert Reynolds, and Dick Spring, placed Northern Ireland at the top of the government agenda. Both were helped considerably by the initiative of John Hume, and the understanding built up between Reynolds, and British Prime Minister John Major. Spring devoted considerable energy and resources towards increasing Ireland's international influence and diplomatic ties in the UN, in the post Cold War world.

As Foreign Minister, there was much critical comment in the media on Spring's extensive foreign travel. Spring got even harsher criticism, for using the Government Jet to reduce journey times between his home in Tralee and his office in Dublin. However, he did conduct, for the first time, a public consultative process that involved a wide range of citizenry and social groups as well as members of the diaspora, in the re-shaping of Irish foreign policy through the first-ever White Paper on Foreign Policy in 1996.

Critics of Dick Spring have described him as a champagne socialist, owing to his choice of the Waldorf Astoria Hotel when staying in New York as Foreign Minister, instead of staying in the Irish-owned Fitzpatrick Hotel. Spring brought the Irish Labour Party unprecedented exposure and power in government, at a time when the two significantly larger right-of-centre political blocs had precedence in every election.

== Subsequent life ==
Spring later became involved in the Cyprus dispute promoting a peace.

In May 1999 Spring received a directorship appointment to the Irish state telecom enterprise, Telecom Éireann, in advance of the scheduled privatisation. As leader of a left-of-centre party, this was to endorse the privatisation and gain consent from the labour unions to the privatisation plan. However, the privatisation was a financial disaster for members of the public, who became ordinary shareholders in the privatisation process and faced a drop in the value of their investments. Spring became the target for much of the discontent. Spring's low work involvement, and generous remuneration package. Senator Shane Ross, an advocate for shareholders, criticised the privatisation for primarily benefitting directors at the expense of the public investors. Spring also attracted criticism for being involved in promoting the flotation despite never buying any shares at launch. Spring is currently a non-executive director with the Financial Services firm FEXCO, based in Killorglin, County Kerry.

Spring lives in Tralee with his wife Kristi (née Hutcheson), an American whom he met while working in New York as a bartender. They have three children. His nephew Arthur Spring was a Labour Party TD for Kerry North–West Limerick until February 2016, having first been a councillor for the Tralee electoral area of Kerry County Council. Spring is a member of Ballybunion Golf Club, and has invited former U.S. President Bill Clinton, amongst others, to visit there.

He was a non-executive director of Allied Irish Banks from 2008 to 2014. It was reported in 2011 that he received annual pension payments of €121,108.

== See also ==
- Families in the Oireachtas

Political offices
Preceded by Seán Doherty	Minister of State at the Department of Justice; 1981–1982	Office vacant
Preceded by Ray MacSharry	Tánaiste; 1982–1987	Succeeded by Brian Lenihan
Preceded by Ray Burke	Minister for the Environment; 1982–1983	Succeeded by Liam Kavanagh
Preceded by John Bruton	Minister for Energy; 1983–1987	Succeeded by Michael Noonan
Preceded by John Wilson	Tánaiste; 1993–1994	Succeeded by Bertie Ahern
Preceded by David Andrews	Minister for Foreign Affairs; 1993–1994	Succeeded by Albert Reynolds
Preceded by Bertie Ahern	Tánaiste; 1994–1997	Succeeded by Mary Harney
Preceded by Albert Reynolds	Minister for Foreign Affairs; 1994–1997	Succeeded by Ray Burke
Party political offices
Preceded by Michael O'Leary	Leader of the Labour Party; 1982–1997	Succeeded by Ruairi Quinn

Dáil	Election	Deputy (Party)	Deputy (Party)	Deputy (Party)	Deputy (Party)
9th	1937	Stephen Fuller (FF)	Tom McEllistrim, Snr (FF)	John O'Sullivan (FG)	Eamon Kissane (FF)
10th	1938	Stephen Fuller (FF)	Tom McEllistrim, Snr (FF)	John O'Sullivan (FG)	Eamon Kissane (FF)
11th	1943	Dan Spring (Lab)	Tom McEllistrim, Snr (FF)	Patrick Finucane (CnaT)	Eamon Kissane (FF)
12th	1944	Dan Spring (NLP)	Tom McEllistrim, Snr (FF)	Patrick Finucane (CnaT)	Eamon Kissane (FF)
13th	1948	Dan Spring (NLP)	Tom McEllistrim, Snr (FF)	Patrick Finucane (CnaT)	Eamon Kissane (FF)
14th	1951	Dan Spring (Lab)	Tom McEllistrim, Snr (FF)	Patrick Finucane (Ind.)	John Lynch (FG)
15th	1954	Dan Spring (Lab)	Tom McEllistrim, Snr (FF)	Patrick Finucane (CnaT)	Johnny Connor (CnaP)
15th	1956 by-election	Dan Spring (Lab)	Tom McEllistrim, Snr (FF)	Patrick Finucane (CnaT)	Kathleen O'Connor (CnaP)
16th	1957	Dan Spring (Lab)	Tom McEllistrim, Snr (FF)	Patrick Finucane (Ind.)	Daniel Moloney (FF)
17th	1961	Dan Spring (Lab)	Tom McEllistrim, Snr (FF)	Patrick Finucane (Ind.)	3 seats from 1961
18th	1965	Dan Spring (Lab)	Tom McEllistrim, Snr (FF)	Patrick Finucane (Ind.)	3 seats from 1961
19th	1969	Dan Spring (Lab)	Gerard Lynch (FG)	Tom McEllistrim, Jnr (FF)	3 seats from 1961
20th	1973	Dan Spring (Lab)	Gerard Lynch (FG)	Tom McEllistrim, Jnr (FF)	3 seats from 1961
21st	1977	Dan Spring (Lab)	Kit Ahern (FF)	Tom McEllistrim, Jnr (FF)	3 seats from 1961
22nd	1981	Dick Spring (Lab)	Denis Foley (FF)	Tom McEllistrim, Jnr (FF)	3 seats from 1961
23rd	1982 (Feb)	Dick Spring (Lab)	Denis Foley (FF)	Tom McEllistrim, Jnr (FF)	3 seats from 1961
24th	1982 (Nov)	Dick Spring (Lab)	Denis Foley (FF)	Tom McEllistrim, Jnr (FF)	3 seats from 1961
25th	1987	Dick Spring (Lab)	Denis Foley (FF)	Jimmy Deenihan (FG)	3 seats from 1961
26th	1989	Dick Spring (Lab)	Tom McEllistrim, Jnr (FF)	Jimmy Deenihan (FG)	3 seats from 1961
27th	1992	Dick Spring (Lab)	Denis Foley (FF)	Jimmy Deenihan (FG)	3 seats from 1961
28th	1997	Dick Spring (Lab)	Denis Foley (FF)	Jimmy Deenihan (FG)	3 seats from 1961
29th	2002	Martin Ferris (SF)	Tom McEllistrim (FF)	Jimmy Deenihan (FG)	3 seats from 1961
30th	2007	Martin Ferris (SF)	Tom McEllistrim (FF)	Jimmy Deenihan (FG)	3 seats from 1961
31st	2011	Constituency abolished. See Kerry North–West Limerick			
