= Eamon Kissane =

Irish politician (1899–1979)

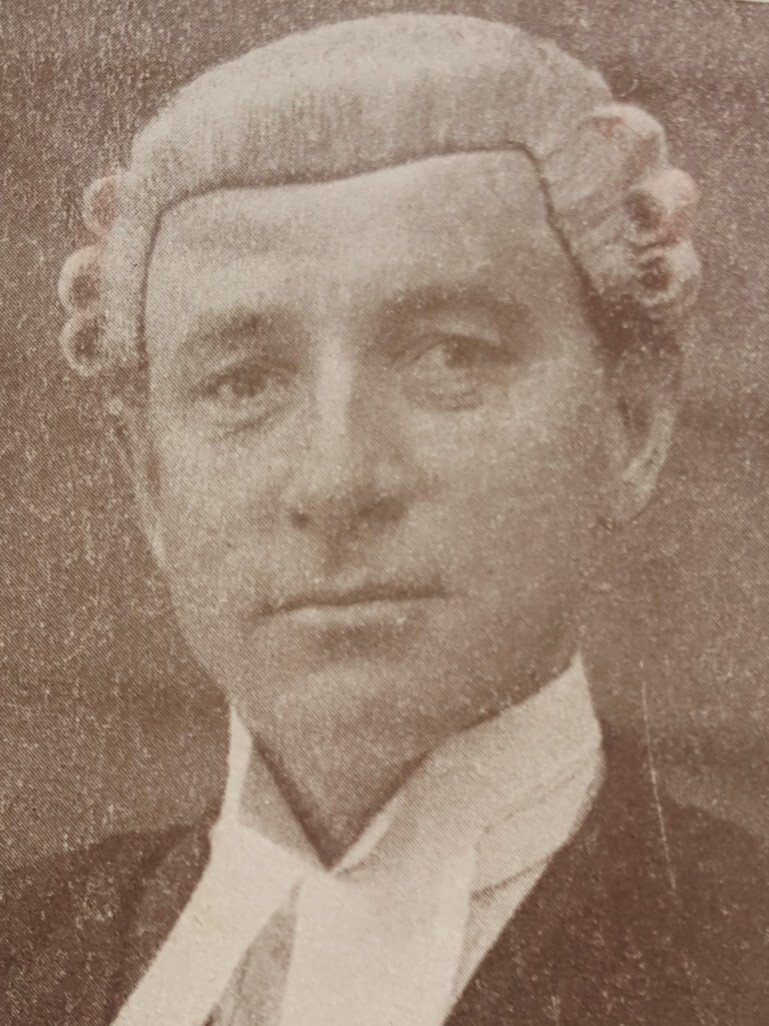
- Kissane, c. 1940s

Parliamentary Secretary
- 1943–1948: Government Chief Whip
- 1943–1948: Defence
- 1943: Lands

Senator
- In office 22 July 1954 – 23 June 1965
- Constituency: Cultural and Educational Panel
- In office 14 August 1951 – 22 July 1954
- Constituency: Nominated by the Taoiseach

Teachta Dála
- In office July 1937 – May 1951
- Constituency: Kerry North
- In office February 1932 – July 1937
- Constituency: Kerry

Personal details
- Born: 13 January 1899 Moyvane, County Kerry, Ireland
- Died: 20 May 1979 (aged 80) New Ross, County Wexford, Ireland
- Party: Fianna Fáil
- Spouse: Anne Kehoe (m. 1935)
- Education: University College Cork; King's Inns

Eamon Kissane (13 January 1899 – 20 May 1979) was an Irish Fianna Fáil politician who served as Parliamentary Secretary to the Taoiseach and Parliamentary Secretary to the Minister for Defence from 1943 to 1948, and Parliamentary Secretary to the Minister for Lands from February 1943 to July 1943. He served as a Senator from 1951 to 1965 and a Teachta Dála (TD) from 1932 to 1951.

A member of a prosperous farming family in Newtownsandes (now Moyvane) in north County Kerry, he joined the Irish Volunteers and was elected to Kerry County Council at the age of 21. He fought in the Irish War of Independence and on the Anti-Treaty side in the Irish Civil War. He was imprisoned by Irish Free State authorities from 1922 to 1923.

Deeply interested in Irish culture, Kissane was a member of Conradh na Gaeilge and worked as a teacher of the Irish language until his election to the Dáil.

== Parliamentary career ==
Kissane was elected to Dáil Éireann as a Fianna Fáil TD for the Kerry constituency at the 1932 general election which began sixteen years of unbroken rule for Éamon de Valera's Fianna Fáil. In the last months of the 10th Dáil, Kissane got his first promotion, as Parliamentary Secretary to the Minister for Lands, from February to June 1943. After Fianna Fáil's victory at the 1944 general election, Kissane was appointed as Parliamentary Secretary to the Taoiseach (Government Chief Whip) and as Parliamentary Secretary to the Minister for Defence. He served in that position until when Fianna Fáil was defeated at the 1948 general election, when the First Inter-Party Government took office.

Fianna Fáil won the 1951 general election, but Kissane lost his Dáil seat in Kerry North. By now living in New Ross, County Wexford, Kissane was unexpectedly defeated by John Lynch of Fine Gael. He stood again in Kerry North at the 1954 general election, but was not successful.

After his defeat in 1951, Kissane was nominated by the Taoiseach to the 7th Seanad, and in 1954, he was elected by the Cultural and Educational Panel to the 8th Seanad. The panel returned him to the next two Seanads, but he did not contest the 1965 election to the 11th Seanad, and retired from politics.

In September 1935 he married Anne Kehoe at the church of St Andrew, Westland Row. He took a law degree late in life, and was called to the bar in 1938.

Kissane was a talented fiddle and flute player and was a founder of Comhaltas Ceoltóirí Éireann.

Political offices
Preceded by Paddy Smith	Government Chief Whip; 1943–1948	Succeeded by Liam Cosgrave
Preceded by Seán Moylan	Parliamentary Secretary to the Minister for Defence; 1943–1948	Succeeded by Brendan Corish
Preceded by Seán O'Grady	Parliamentary Secretary to the Minister for Lands; Feb.–Jul. 1943	Succeeded by Jack Lynch

Dáil	Election	Deputy (Party)	Deputy (Party)	Deputy (Party)	Deputy (Party)	Deputy (Party)	Deputy (Party)	Deputy (Party)
4th	1923	Tom McEllistrim (Rep)	Austin Stack (Rep)	Patrick Cahill (Rep)	Thomas O'Donoghue (Rep)	James Crowley (CnaG)	Fionán Lynch (CnaG)	John O'Sullivan (CnaG)
5th	1927 (Jun)	Tom McEllistrim (FF)	Austin Stack (SF)	William O'Leary (FF)	Thomas O'Reilly (FF)	James Crowley (CnaG)	Fionán Lynch (CnaG)	John O'Sullivan (CnaG)
6th	1927 (Sep)	Tom McEllistrim (FF)	Frederick Crowley (FF)	William O'Leary (FF)	Thomas O'Reilly (FF)	James Crowley (CnaG)	Fionán Lynch (CnaG)	John O'Sullivan (CnaG)
7th	1932	Tom McEllistrim (FF)	Frederick Crowley (FF)	John Flynn (FF)	Thomas O'Reilly (FF)	Eamon Kissane (FF)	Fionán Lynch (CnaG)	John O'Sullivan (CnaG)
8th	1933	Tom McEllistrim (FF)	Frederick Crowley (FF)	John Flynn (FF)	Denis Daly (FF)	Eamon Kissane (FF)	Fionán Lynch (CnaG)	John O'Sullivan (CnaG)
9th	1937	Constituency abolished. See Kerry North and Kerry South						

Dáil	Election	Deputy (Party)	Deputy (Party)	Deputy (Party)	Deputy (Party)	Deputy (Party)
32nd	2016	Martin Ferris (SF)	Michael Healy-Rae (Ind.)	Danny Healy-Rae (Ind.)	John Brassil (FF)	Brendan Griffin (FG)
33rd	2020	Pa Daly (SF)	Michael Healy-Rae (Ind.)	Danny Healy-Rae (Ind.)	Norma Foley (FF)	Brendan Griffin (FG)
34th	2024	Pa Daly (SF)	Michael Healy-Rae (Ind.)	Danny Healy-Rae (Ind.)	Norma Foley (FF)	Michael Cahill (FF)

Dáil	Election	Deputy (Party)	Deputy (Party)	Deputy (Party)	Deputy (Party)
9th	1937	Stephen Fuller (FF)	Tom McEllistrim, Snr (FF)	John O'Sullivan (FG)	Eamon Kissane (FF)
10th	1938	Stephen Fuller (FF)	Tom McEllistrim, Snr (FF)	John O'Sullivan (FG)	Eamon Kissane (FF)
11th	1943	Dan Spring (Lab)	Tom McEllistrim, Snr (FF)	Patrick Finucane (CnaT)	Eamon Kissane (FF)
12th	1944	Dan Spring (NLP)	Tom McEllistrim, Snr (FF)	Patrick Finucane (CnaT)	Eamon Kissane (FF)
13th	1948	Dan Spring (NLP)	Tom McEllistrim, Snr (FF)	Patrick Finucane (CnaT)	Eamon Kissane (FF)
14th	1951	Dan Spring (Lab)	Tom McEllistrim, Snr (FF)	Patrick Finucane (Ind.)	John Lynch (FG)
15th	1954	Dan Spring (Lab)	Tom McEllistrim, Snr (FF)	Patrick Finucane (CnaT)	Johnny Connor (CnaP)
15th	1956 by-election	Dan Spring (Lab)	Tom McEllistrim, Snr (FF)	Patrick Finucane (CnaT)	Kathleen O'Connor (CnaP)
16th	1957	Dan Spring (Lab)	Tom McEllistrim, Snr (FF)	Patrick Finucane (Ind.)	Daniel Moloney (FF)
17th	1961	Dan Spring (Lab)	Tom McEllistrim, Snr (FF)	Patrick Finucane (Ind.)	3 seats from 1961
18th	1965	Dan Spring (Lab)	Tom McEllistrim, Snr (FF)	Patrick Finucane (Ind.)	3 seats from 1961
19th	1969	Dan Spring (Lab)	Gerard Lynch (FG)	Tom McEllistrim, Jnr (FF)	3 seats from 1961
20th	1973	Dan Spring (Lab)	Gerard Lynch (FG)	Tom McEllistrim, Jnr (FF)	3 seats from 1961
21st	1977	Dan Spring (Lab)	Kit Ahern (FF)	Tom McEllistrim, Jnr (FF)	3 seats from 1961
22nd	1981	Dick Spring (Lab)	Denis Foley (FF)	Tom McEllistrim, Jnr (FF)	3 seats from 1961
23rd	1982 (Feb)	Dick Spring (Lab)	Denis Foley (FF)	Tom McEllistrim, Jnr (FF)	3 seats from 1961
24th	1982 (Nov)	Dick Spring (Lab)	Denis Foley (FF)	Tom McEllistrim, Jnr (FF)	3 seats from 1961
25th	1987	Dick Spring (Lab)	Denis Foley (FF)	Jimmy Deenihan (FG)	3 seats from 1961
26th	1989	Dick Spring (Lab)	Tom McEllistrim, Jnr (FF)	Jimmy Deenihan (FG)	3 seats from 1961
27th	1992	Dick Spring (Lab)	Denis Foley (FF)	Jimmy Deenihan (FG)	3 seats from 1961
28th	1997	Dick Spring (Lab)	Denis Foley (FF)	Jimmy Deenihan (FG)	3 seats from 1961
29th	2002	Martin Ferris (SF)	Tom McEllistrim (FF)	Jimmy Deenihan (FG)	3 seats from 1961
30th	2007	Martin Ferris (SF)	Tom McEllistrim (FF)	Jimmy Deenihan (FG)	3 seats from 1961
31st	2011	Constituency abolished. See Kerry North–West Limerick			
