= Tom McEllistrim (1926–2000) =

Irish politician (1926–2000)

Minister of State
- Mar.–Dec. 1982: Fisheries and Forestry
- 1979–1981: Finance

Teachta Dála
- In office June 1989 – November 1992
- In office June 1969 – February 1987
- Constituency: Kerry North

Senator
- In office 25 April 1987 – 15 June 1989
- Constituency: Nominated by the Taoiseach

Personal details
- Born: 15 January 1926 Boherbue, County Cork, Ireland
- Died: 25 February 2000 (aged 74) Tralee, County Kerry, Ireland
- Party: Fianna Fáil
- Children: Tom McEllistrim
- Parent: Tom McEllistrim (father)

Thomas McEllistrim (15 January 1926 – 25 February 2000) was an Irish Fianna Fáil politician who served as a Minister of State from 1979 to 1981 and from March 1982 to December 1982. He served as a Teachta Dála (TD) for the Kerry North constituency from 1969 to 1987 and 1989 to 1992 and a Senator from 1987 to 1989, after being Nominated by the Taoiseach.

== Biography ==
Born in Boherbue, County Cork, in 1926, McEllistrim was the son of the Fianna Fáil politician and War of Independence veteran, Tom McEllistrim. McEllistrim the younger succeeded his father when he was elected to Dáil Éireann as a Fianna Fáil TD for the Kerry North constituency at the 1969 general election. At the 1977 general election, McEllistrim was elected along with his running mate Kit Ahern. This was the first time that Fianna Fáil had won two seats in the three-seat Kerry North constituency. McEllistrim, who was given much credit for this victory, was disappointed not to receive a promotion as a Minister of State.

McEllistrim became disillusioned with the Taoiseach and party leader Jack Lynch from then and began to believe that Charles Haughey was the right candidate for the party leadership. McEllistrim believed that Lynch was about to retire and was uncomfortable at the thought of George Colley succeeding Lynch. Like his father before him, he believed Colley was not right for the role of leader of the party and not republican enough. McEllistrim was particularly vocal with regard to party policy towards Northern Ireland and, as he saw it, Lynch's apparent lack of sympathy towards the northern nationalist community.

McEllistrim was a member of the so-called "gang of five" along with Seán Doherty, Mark Killilea Jnr, Jackie Fahey and Albert Reynolds who started a lobbying campaign in favour of Haughey on the backbenches of the party. After Lynch lost two by-elections in his native Cork he resigned as party leader in December 1979. Two days later, the leadership contest was called. It was a two-way race between Haughey and Colley, which Haughey won by a decisive margin. Ellistrim was rewarded by being appointed Minister of State at the Department of Finance with special responsibility for the Office of Public Works. Fianna Fáil went into opposition after the 1981 general election, but returned to office after the February 1982 general election. McEllistrim was appointed as Minister of State at the Department of Fisheries and Forestry with responsibility for Forestry, serving from March to December 1982.

McEllistrim lost his seat at the 1987 general election by four votes to Dick Spring. After being nominated to Seanad Éireann as a senator, he regained his seat at the 1989 general election but did not retain it at the 1992 general election when he lost to constituency colleague Denis Foley.

McEllistrim died aged 74 on 25 February 2000. His son, Tom McEllistrim, was a TD for Kerry North from 2002 to 2011.

== See also ==
- Families in the Oireachtas

Political offices
Preceded by Pearse Wyse	Minister of State at the Department of Finance; 1979–1981	Succeeded by Joseph Bermingham
New office	Minister of State at the Department of Fisheries and Forestry; Mar.–Dec. 1982	Succeeded by Michael D'Arcy

Dáil	Election	Deputy (Party)	Deputy (Party)	Deputy (Party)	Deputy (Party)
9th	1937	Stephen Fuller (FF)	Tom McEllistrim, Snr (FF)	John O'Sullivan (FG)	Eamon Kissane (FF)
10th	1938	Stephen Fuller (FF)	Tom McEllistrim, Snr (FF)	John O'Sullivan (FG)	Eamon Kissane (FF)
11th	1943	Dan Spring (Lab)	Tom McEllistrim, Snr (FF)	Patrick Finucane (CnaT)	Eamon Kissane (FF)
12th	1944	Dan Spring (NLP)	Tom McEllistrim, Snr (FF)	Patrick Finucane (CnaT)	Eamon Kissane (FF)
13th	1948	Dan Spring (NLP)	Tom McEllistrim, Snr (FF)	Patrick Finucane (CnaT)	Eamon Kissane (FF)
14th	1951	Dan Spring (Lab)	Tom McEllistrim, Snr (FF)	Patrick Finucane (Ind.)	John Lynch (FG)
15th	1954	Dan Spring (Lab)	Tom McEllistrim, Snr (FF)	Patrick Finucane (CnaT)	Johnny Connor (CnaP)
15th	1956 by-election	Dan Spring (Lab)	Tom McEllistrim, Snr (FF)	Patrick Finucane (CnaT)	Kathleen O'Connor (CnaP)
16th	1957	Dan Spring (Lab)	Tom McEllistrim, Snr (FF)	Patrick Finucane (Ind.)	Daniel Moloney (FF)
17th	1961	Dan Spring (Lab)	Tom McEllistrim, Snr (FF)	Patrick Finucane (Ind.)	3 seats from 1961
18th	1965	Dan Spring (Lab)	Tom McEllistrim, Snr (FF)	Patrick Finucane (Ind.)	3 seats from 1961
19th	1969	Dan Spring (Lab)	Gerard Lynch (FG)	Tom McEllistrim, Jnr (FF)	3 seats from 1961
20th	1973	Dan Spring (Lab)	Gerard Lynch (FG)	Tom McEllistrim, Jnr (FF)	3 seats from 1961
21st	1977	Dan Spring (Lab)	Kit Ahern (FF)	Tom McEllistrim, Jnr (FF)	3 seats from 1961
22nd	1981	Dick Spring (Lab)	Denis Foley (FF)	Tom McEllistrim, Jnr (FF)	3 seats from 1961
23rd	1982 (Feb)	Dick Spring (Lab)	Denis Foley (FF)	Tom McEllistrim, Jnr (FF)	3 seats from 1961
24th	1982 (Nov)	Dick Spring (Lab)	Denis Foley (FF)	Tom McEllistrim, Jnr (FF)	3 seats from 1961
25th	1987	Dick Spring (Lab)	Denis Foley (FF)	Jimmy Deenihan (FG)	3 seats from 1961
26th	1989	Dick Spring (Lab)	Tom McEllistrim, Jnr (FF)	Jimmy Deenihan (FG)	3 seats from 1961
27th	1992	Dick Spring (Lab)	Denis Foley (FF)	Jimmy Deenihan (FG)	3 seats from 1961
28th	1997	Dick Spring (Lab)	Denis Foley (FF)	Jimmy Deenihan (FG)	3 seats from 1961
29th	2002	Martin Ferris (SF)	Tom McEllistrim (FF)	Jimmy Deenihan (FG)	3 seats from 1961
30th	2007	Martin Ferris (SF)	Tom McEllistrim (FF)	Jimmy Deenihan (FG)	3 seats from 1961
31st	2011	Constituency abolished. See Kerry North–West Limerick			
