= Dan Spring =

Irish politician (1910–1988)

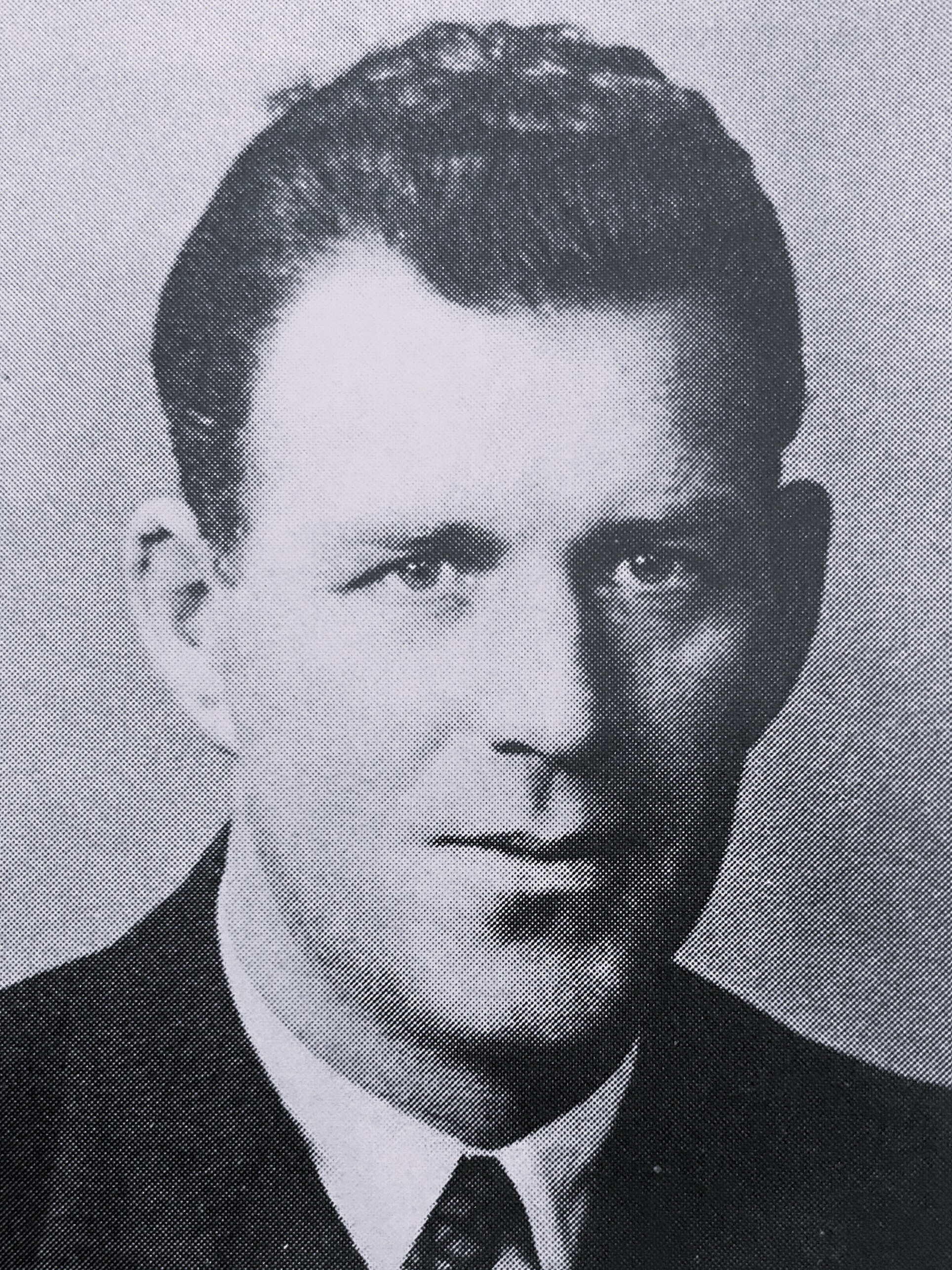
- Spring in 1944

Parliamentary Secretary
- 1956–1957: Local Government

Teachta Dála
- In office June 1943 – June 1981
- Constituency: Kerry North

Personal details
- Born: Daniel Spring; 22 July 1910 Tralee, County Kerry, Ireland
- Died: 6 September 1988 (aged 78) Tralee, County Kerry, Ireland
- Party: Labour Party
- Other political affiliations: National Labour Party
- Spouse: Anna Laide (m. 1944)
- Children: 6, including Dick and Donal
- Relatives: Arthur Spring (grandson)

Dan Spring
Sport
- Sport: Gaelic football
- Position: Full-Forward
Club
- Years: Club
- 1930s–1940s: Kerins O'Rahilly's
Club titles
- Kerry titles: 2
Inter-county
| Years | County | Apps (scores) |
| 1934–1940 | Kerry | 13 (6-10) |
Inter-county titles
- Munster titles: 4
- All-Irelands: 3
- NFL: 0
- All Stars: 0

Dan Spring (22 July 1910 – 6 September 1988) was an Irish Labour Party politician who served as a Teachta Dála (TD) for the Kerry North constituency from 1943 to 1981. He was a Parliamentary Secretary to the Minister for Local Government from 1956 to 1957. He was the father of Dick Spring, who led the Labour Party from 1982 to 1997.

== Early life ==
Spring was born into a working-class family in Tralee, County Kerry in 1910. He left school at the age of 14 and began his working life with a series of low-skilled jobs. When he was working at a mill, he became involved in the Irish Transport and General Workers' Union (ITGWU) and after a while became a trade union official. He married Anna Laide (1919–1997) in 1944, and they had six children.

== Sporting career ==
Spring was a Gaelic football player, and was the captain of the Tralee Kerins O'Rahilly's team with whom he won two Kerry Senior Football Championship titles in 1933 and 1939. He first played with Kerry when he won Munster and All-Ireland Junior titles in 1930. He later joined the senior team where he won All-Ireland titles in 1939 and captain of the side when they won the All-Ireland final in 1940.

== Politics ==
He was elected to both Tralee Urban District Council (topping the poll) and Kerry County Council, representing the Labour Party in 1942. Through his involvement with the ITGWU he became well known enough to stand in Kerry North for the Labour Party at the 1943 general election. He was elected as the first Labour Party Teachta Dála (TD) for Kerry and held his seat until he retired in 1981.

In 1944, Spring was among a group of six TDs who broke away from the Labour Party because it was allegedly infiltrated by communists and formed a new party they called the National Labour Party. The Labour Party and the National Labour Party reunited in 1950, having worked alongside each other in the First inter-party government since 1948.

In 1956, during the term of the Second inter-party government Spring was appointed as Parliamentary Secretary to the Minister for Local Government, which he held until the government ended in 1957.

For the rest of his political career Spring never held any significant post on a national level, and as a relatively conservative rural Labour man he fell out of step with the official line of the Labour Party, which moved significantly to the left during the 1960s and 1970s. During a vote on contraception, Spring famously said that on the day of the vote, his constituents would see how he stood on the issue. On the day of the vote, he appeared as a barrister in a court far away from the Dáil. Spring concentrated on his constituency work and was returned in every election he stood in until he retired in 1981, his son Dick then successfully contesting the seat.

== See also ==
- Families in the Oireachtas

Political offices
| Preceded by William Davin | Parliamentary Secretary to the Minister for Local Government; 1956–1957 | Office abolished |

| Dáil | Election | Deputy (Party) | Deputy (Party) | Deputy (Party) | Deputy (Party) |
|---|---|---|---|---|---|
| 9th | 1937 | Stephen Fuller (FF) | Tom McEllistrim, Snr (FF) | John O'Sullivan (FG) | Eamon Kissane (FF) |
| 10th | 1938 | Stephen Fuller (FF) | Tom McEllistrim, Snr (FF) | John O'Sullivan (FG) | Eamon Kissane (FF) |
| 11th | 1943 | Dan Spring (Lab) | Tom McEllistrim, Snr (FF) | Patrick Finucane (CnaT) | Eamon Kissane (FF) |
| 12th | 1944 | Dan Spring (NLP) | Tom McEllistrim, Snr (FF) | Patrick Finucane (CnaT) | Eamon Kissane (FF) |
| 13th | 1948 | Dan Spring (NLP) | Tom McEllistrim, Snr (FF) | Patrick Finucane (CnaT) | Eamon Kissane (FF) |
| 14th | 1951 | Dan Spring (Lab) | Tom McEllistrim, Snr (FF) | Patrick Finucane (Ind.) | John Lynch (FG) |
| 15th | 1954 | Dan Spring (Lab) | Tom McEllistrim, Snr (FF) | Patrick Finucane (CnaT) | Johnny Connor (CnaP) |
| 15th | 1956 by-election | Dan Spring (Lab) | Tom McEllistrim, Snr (FF) | Patrick Finucane (CnaT) | Kathleen O'Connor (CnaP) |
| 16th | 1957 | Dan Spring (Lab) | Tom McEllistrim, Snr (FF) | Patrick Finucane (Ind.) | Daniel Moloney (FF) |
| 17th | 1961 | Dan Spring (Lab) | Tom McEllistrim, Snr (FF) | Patrick Finucane (Ind.) | 3 seats from 1961 |
| 18th | 1965 | Dan Spring (Lab) | Tom McEllistrim, Snr (FF) | Patrick Finucane (Ind.) | 3 seats from 1961 |
| 19th | 1969 | Dan Spring (Lab) | Gerard Lynch (FG) | Tom McEllistrim, Jnr (FF) | 3 seats from 1961 |
| 20th | 1973 | Dan Spring (Lab) | Gerard Lynch (FG) | Tom McEllistrim, Jnr (FF) | 3 seats from 1961 |
| 21st | 1977 | Dan Spring (Lab) | Kit Ahern (FF) | Tom McEllistrim, Jnr (FF) | 3 seats from 1961 |
| 22nd | 1981 | Dick Spring (Lab) | Denis Foley (FF) | Tom McEllistrim, Jnr (FF) | 3 seats from 1961 |
| 23rd | 1982 (Feb) | Dick Spring (Lab) | Denis Foley (FF) | Tom McEllistrim, Jnr (FF) | 3 seats from 1961 |
| 24th | 1982 (Nov) | Dick Spring (Lab) | Denis Foley (FF) | Tom McEllistrim, Jnr (FF) | 3 seats from 1961 |
| 25th | 1987 | Dick Spring (Lab) | Denis Foley (FF) | Jimmy Deenihan (FG) | 3 seats from 1961 |
| 26th | 1989 | Dick Spring (Lab) | Tom McEllistrim, Jnr (FF) | Jimmy Deenihan (FG) | 3 seats from 1961 |
| 27th | 1992 | Dick Spring (Lab) | Denis Foley (FF) | Jimmy Deenihan (FG) | 3 seats from 1961 |
| 28th | 1997 | Dick Spring (Lab) | Denis Foley (FF) | Jimmy Deenihan (FG) | 3 seats from 1961 |
| 29th | 2002 | Martin Ferris (SF) | Tom McEllistrim (FF) | Jimmy Deenihan (FG) | 3 seats from 1961 |
| 30th | 2007 | Martin Ferris (SF) | Tom McEllistrim (FF) | Jimmy Deenihan (FG) | 3 seats from 1961 |
| 31st | 2011 | Constituency abolished. See Kerry North–West Limerick | | | |
