= Kerry North (Dáil constituency) =

Dáil constituency (1937–2016)

- Former Dáil constituency
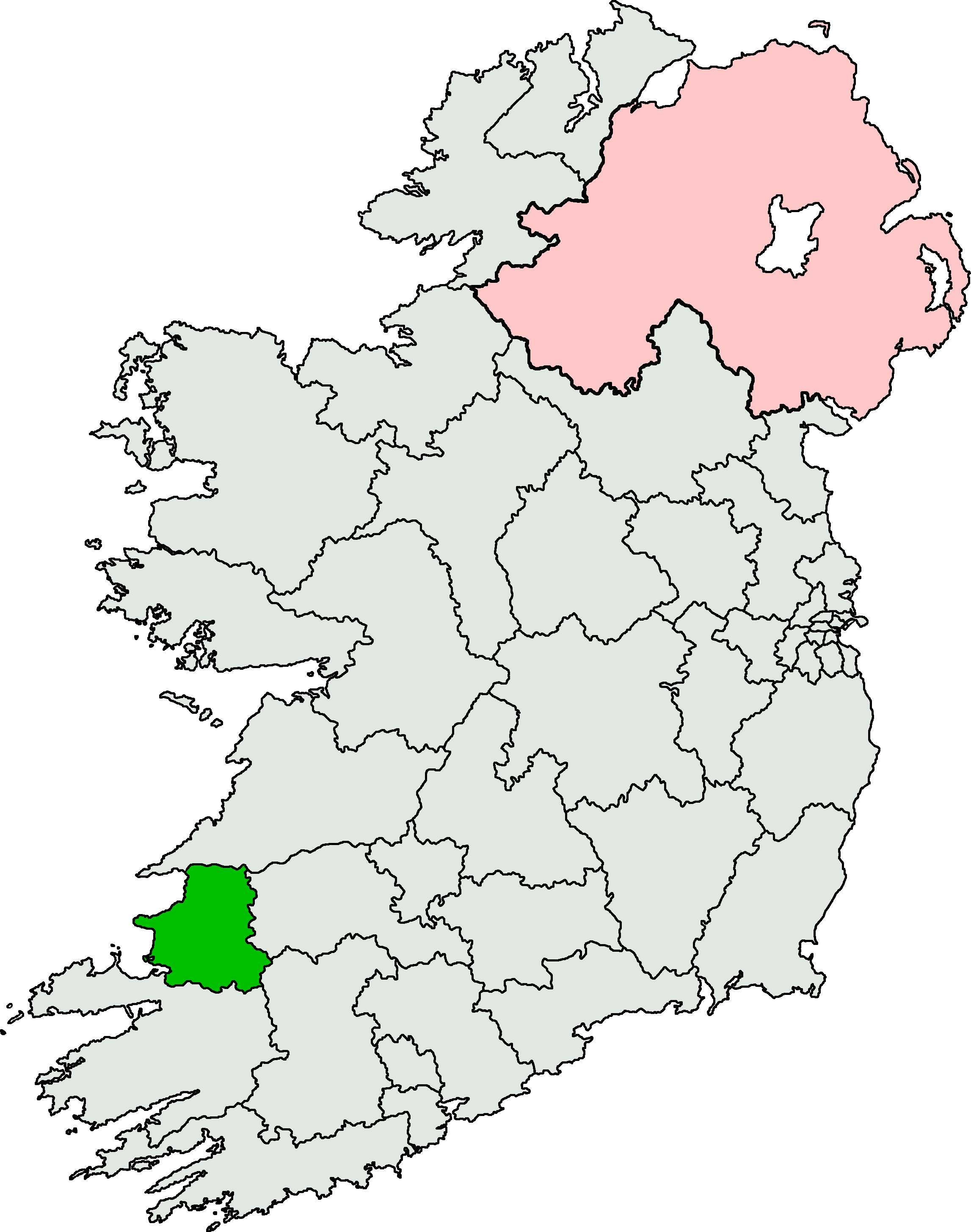
- Location of Kerry North within Ireland

Former constituency
- Created: 1937
- Abolished: 2011
- Seats: 4 (1937–1961); 3 (1961–2011)
- Local government area: County Kerry
- Created from: Kerry
- Replaced by: Kerry North–West Limerick

Kerry North was a parliamentary constituency represented in Dáil Éireann, the house of representatives of the Oireachtas (the Irish parliament), from 1937 to 2011. The method of election was proportional representation by means of the single transferable vote (PR-STV).

== History and boundaries ==
The constituency was located in the northern half of County Kerry, located between the River Shannon estuary and the Slieve Mish Mountains; and included Tralee, Listowel, Tarbert, Ballybunion and Castleisland. Until 1961 it also included the Dingle Peninsula, which was then transferred to Kerry South. It was established by the Electoral (Revision of Constituencies) Act 1935 when the former Kerry constituency was divided into Kerry North and Kerry South. It was first used at the 1937 general election to the 9th Dáil.

The constituency elected four deputies (Teachtaí Dála, commonly known as TDs) from 1937 to 1961 and three deputies from 1961 to 2011.

From 2007 to 2011, it had been defined as:

"In the county of Kerry the electoral divisions of:

Deelis, in the former Rural District of Dingle;
Kilfelim, in the former Rural District of Killarney;
Ardagh, Astee, Ballincloher, Ballyconry, Ballyduff, Ballyegan, Ballyhorgan, Beal, Carrig, Causeway, Cloontubbrid, Drommartin, Duagh, Ennismore, Gullane, Gunsborough, Kilfeighny, Killehenny, Killury, Kilmeany, Kilshenane, Kiltomy, Leitrim, Lislaughtin, Lisselton, Listowel Rural, Lixnaw, Moynsha, Newtownsandes, Rathea, Shronowen, Tarbert, Tarmon, Trienearagh, Urlee, in the former Rural District of Listowel;
Abbeydorney, Arabela, Ardfert, Ballyegan, Ballyheige, Ballynahaglish, Ballynorig, Ballyseedy, Banna, Baurtregaum, Blennerville, Brosna, Castleisland, Clogherbrien, Cordal, Crinny, Doon, Gneeves, Kerryhead, Kilflyn, Kilgobban, Killahan, Kilmurry, Knockglass, Knocknagashel, Lackabaun, Mount Eagle, Nohaval, O'Brennan, Ratass, Tralee Rural, Tubrid, in the former Rural District of Tralee;
and the towns of Listowel and Tralee."

In 2007, the Constituency Commission proposed that at the next general election the constituency of Kerry North be replaced with Kerry North–West Limerick, with the transfer of certain electoral divisions from Limerick West and other electoral divisions to Kerry South. It was established by the Electoral (Amendment) Act 2009, and was used at the 2011 general election.

The constituency of Kerry North–West Limerick comprised the northern half of County Kerry, located between the River Shannon estuary and the Slieve Mish Mountains; taking in Tralee, Listowel, Tarbert, Ballybunion and Castleisland; and the western part of County Limerick taking in the town of Abbeyfeale; and the villages of Athea, Glin, Mountcollins, Templeglantine and Tournafulla. It was only used at the 2011 general election.

At the 2016 general election, Kerry North–West Limerick and Kerry South were superseded by the constituencies of Kerry and Limerick County.

== TDs ==
Teachtaí Dála (TDs) for Kerry North 1937–2011
Key to parties: CnaP = Clann na Poblachta; CnaT = Clann na Talmhan; FF = Fianna Fáil; FG = Fine Gael; Ind. = Independent; Lab = Labour; NLP = National Labour Party; SF = Sinn Féin
Dáil	Election	Deputy (Party)	Deputy (Party)	Deputy (Party)	Deputy (Party)
9th	1937	Stephen Fuller (FF)	Tom McEllistrim, Snr (FF)	John O'Sullivan (FG)	Eamon Kissane (FF)
10th	1938	Stephen Fuller (FF)	Tom McEllistrim, Snr (FF)	John O'Sullivan (FG)	Eamon Kissane (FF)
11th	1943	Dan Spring (Lab)	Tom McEllistrim, Snr (FF)	Patrick Finucane (CnaT)	Eamon Kissane (FF)
12th	1944	Dan Spring (NLP)	Tom McEllistrim, Snr (FF)	Patrick Finucane (CnaT)	Eamon Kissane (FF)
13th	1948	Dan Spring (NLP)	Tom McEllistrim, Snr (FF)	Patrick Finucane (CnaT)	Eamon Kissane (FF)
14th	1951	Dan Spring (Lab)	Tom McEllistrim, Snr (FF)	Patrick Finucane (Ind.)	John Lynch (FG)
15th	1954	Dan Spring (Lab)	Tom McEllistrim, Snr (FF)	Patrick Finucane (CnaT)	Johnny Connor (CnaP)
15th	1956 by-election	Dan Spring (Lab)	Tom McEllistrim, Snr (FF)	Patrick Finucane (CnaT)	Kathleen O'Connor (CnaP)
16th	1957	Dan Spring (Lab)	Tom McEllistrim, Snr (FF)	Patrick Finucane (Ind.)	Daniel Moloney (FF)
17th	1961	Dan Spring (Lab)	Tom McEllistrim, Snr (FF)	Patrick Finucane (Ind.)	3 seats from 1961
18th	1965	Dan Spring (Lab)	Tom McEllistrim, Snr (FF)	Patrick Finucane (Ind.)	3 seats from 1961
19th	1969	Dan Spring (Lab)	Gerard Lynch (FG)	Tom McEllistrim, Jnr (FF)	3 seats from 1961
20th	1973	Dan Spring (Lab)	Gerard Lynch (FG)	Tom McEllistrim, Jnr (FF)	3 seats from 1961
21st	1977	Dan Spring (Lab)	Kit Ahern (FF)	Tom McEllistrim, Jnr (FF)	3 seats from 1961
22nd	1981	Dick Spring (Lab)	Denis Foley (FF)	Tom McEllistrim, Jnr (FF)	3 seats from 1961
23rd	1982 (Feb)	Dick Spring (Lab)	Denis Foley (FF)	Tom McEllistrim, Jnr (FF)	3 seats from 1961
24th	1982 (Nov)	Dick Spring (Lab)	Denis Foley (FF)	Tom McEllistrim, Jnr (FF)	3 seats from 1961
25th	1987	Dick Spring (Lab)	Denis Foley (FF)	Jimmy Deenihan (FG)	3 seats from 1961
26th	1989	Dick Spring (Lab)	Tom McEllistrim, Jnr (FF)	Jimmy Deenihan (FG)	3 seats from 1961
27th	1992	Dick Spring (Lab)	Denis Foley (FF)	Jimmy Deenihan (FG)	3 seats from 1961
28th	1997	Dick Spring (Lab)	Denis Foley (FF)	Jimmy Deenihan (FG)	3 seats from 1961
29th	2002	Martin Ferris (SF)	Tom McEllistrim (FF)	Jimmy Deenihan (FG)	3 seats from 1961
30th	2007	Martin Ferris (SF)	Tom McEllistrim (FF)	Jimmy Deenihan (FG)	3 seats from 1961
31st	2011	Constituency abolished. See Kerry North–West Limerick			

Note: The columns in this table are used only for presentational purposes, and no significance should be attached to the order of columns. For details of the order in which seats were won at each election, see the detailed results of that election.

== Elections ==
*: Outgoing TD

=== 2007 general election ===
2007 general election: Kerry North
Party	Candidate	FPv%	Count			
Party	Candidate	FPv%	1	2	3	4
Fine Gael	Jimmy Deenihan	32.3	12,697			
Sinn Féin	Martin Ferris	20.4	8,030	8,631	9,284	10,196
Fianna Fáil	Tom McEllistrim	18.7	7,367	7,702	8,040	11,247
Fianna Fáil	Norma Foley	12.5	4,937	5,257	5,535	
Labour	Terry O'Brien	10.9	4,287	5,589	6,332	7,282
Green	David Grey	1.9	747	893		
Independent	Anthony Dineen	1.7	689	803		
Independent	Sam Locke	1.0	397	417		
Independent	Tom Donovan	0.3	111	134		
Independent	Michael O'Connor	0.1	51	58		
Electorate: 56,216 Valid: 39,313 Spoilt: 334 (0.8%) Quota: 9,829 Turnout: 39,647 (70.5%)

=== 2002 general election ===
2002 general election: Kerry North
Party	Candidate	FPv%	Count		
Party	Candidate	FPv%	1	2	3
Sinn Féin	Martin Ferris	24.1	9,496	10,016	
Labour	Dick Spring	22.4	8,773	9,166	9,353
Fine Gael	Jimmy Deenihan	22.1	8,652	9,538	9,842
Fianna Fáil	Tom McEllistrim	20.2	7,884	10,285	
Fianna Fáil	Dan Kiely	10.0	3,927		
Ind. Health Alliance	James Kennedy	0.6	233		
Independent	Anthony O'Connor	0.5	208		
Electorate: 55,476 Valid: 39,173 Spoilt: 351 (0.9%) Quota: 9,794 Turnout: 39,524 (71.3%)

=== 1997 general election ===
1997 general election: Kerry North
Party	Candidate	FPv%	Count			
Party	Candidate	FPv%	1	2	3	4
Labour	Dick Spring	29.9	10,699			
Fine Gael	Jimmy Deenihan	24.3	8,689	9,711		
Sinn Féin	Martin Ferris	15.9	5,691	6,003	6,261	7,294
Fianna Fáil	Denis Foley	15.0	5,376	5,607	5,882	9,719
Fianna Fáil	Tom McEllistrim, Jnr	11.3	4,036	4,173	4,277	
National Party	Ciarán O'Connell	3.6	1,288	1,340	1,469	
Electorate: 51,348 Valid: 35,779 Spoilt: 284 (0.8%) Quota: 8,945 Turnout: 36,063 (70.2%)

=== 1992 general election ===
1992 general election: Kerry North
Party	Candidate	FPv%	Count					
Party	Candidate	FPv%	1	2	3	4	5	6
Labour	Dick Spring	33.9	11,515					
Fine Gael	Jimmy Deenihan	23.9	8,120	9,665				
Fianna Fáil	Denis Foley	14.7	4,974	5,699	6,210	6,469	6,964	8,698
Fianna Fáil	Tom McEllistrim, Jnr	13.6	4,619	4,932	5,108	5,270	5,565	6,473
Fianna Fáil	Ned O'Sullivan	8.2	2,781	2,921	3,081	3,174	3,377	
Independent	Michael Reidy	3.3	1,122	1,278	1,451	1,606		
Sinn Féin	Billy Leen	2.4	802	954	1,031			
Electorate: 48,797 Valid: 33,933 Spoilt: 400 (1.2%) Quota: 8,484 Turnout: 34,333 (70.4%)

=== 1989 general election ===
1989 general election: Kerry North
Party	Candidate	FPv%	Count		
Party	Candidate	FPv%	1	2	3
Labour	Dick Spring	29.7	10,118		
Fine Gael	Jimmy Deenihan	25.5	8,692		
Fianna Fáil	Tom McEllistrim, Jnr	19.8	6,756	7,228	8,402
Fianna Fáil	Denis Foley	17.3	5,880	6,769	8,047
Fianna Fáil	Ned O'Sullivan	7.8	2,641	2,876	
Electorate: 46,715 Valid: 34,087 Quota: 8,522 Turnout: 72.9%

=== 1987 general election ===
1987 general election: Kerry North
Party	Candidate	FPv%	Count					
Party	Candidate	FPv%	1	2	3	4	5	6
Fine Gael	Jimmy Deenihan	29.0	10,087					
Fianna Fáil	Denis Foley	21.9	7,611	7,778	7,888	8,118	9,619	
Labour	Dick Spring	19.4	6,739	7,555	7,635	7,824	8,311	8,383
Fianna Fáil	Tom McEllistrim, Jnr	17.7	6,161	6,293	6,344	6,449	7,523	8,378
Fianna Fáil	Dan Kiely	8.5	2,939	3,119	3,127	3,370		
Sinn Féin	Declan Finucane	1.9	668	752	1,061			
Sinn Féin	William Leen	1.6	559	576				
Electorate: 45,602 Valid: 34,764 Quota: 8,692 Turnout: 76.2%

=== November 1982 general election ===
November 1982 general election: Kerry North
Party	Candidate	FPv%	Count				
Party	Candidate	FPv%	1	2	3	4	5
Labour	Dick Spring	28.9	9,724				
Fianna Fáil	Tom McEllistrim, Jnr	21.2	7,125	7,142	7,375	9,655	
Fine Gael	Jimmy Deenihan	17.3	5,817	6,614	7,291	8,055	8,159
Fianna Fáil	Dan Kiely	15.1	5,081	5,087	5,227		
Fianna Fáil	Denis Foley	14.9	5,025	5,054	5,318	7,162	8,303
Fine Gael	Bernie Gannon	2.6	866				
Electorate: 42,982 Valid: 33,638 Quota: 8,410 Turnout: 78.3%

=== February 1982 general election ===
February 1982 general election: Kerry North
Party	Candidate	FPv%	Count			
Party	Candidate	FPv%	1	2	3	4
Labour	Dick Spring	25.8	8,552			
Fianna Fáil	Tom McEllistrim, Jnr	20.4	6,754	7,076	9,585	
Fianna Fáil	Denis Foley	17.1	5,646	6,098	7,950	9,123
Fine Gael	Robert Pierse	17.1	5,643	5,836	6,513	6,647
Fianna Fáil	Dan Kiely	16.0	5,297	5,416		
Independent	Denis Foley	3.7	1,218			
Electorate: 42,856 Valid: 33,110 Spoilt: 240 (0.7%) Quota: 8,278 Turnout: 33,350 (77.8%)

=== 1981 general election ===
1981 general election: Kerry North
Party	Candidate	FPv%	Count					
Party	Candidate	FPv%	1	2	3	4	5	6
Fianna Fáil	Tom McEllistrim, Jnr	24.0	8,214	8,302	8,991			
Labour	Dick Spring	16.6	5,685	6,055	6,973	7,509	7,763	8,163
Fianna Fáil	Denis Foley	14.9	5,104	5,199	6,096	9,276		
Fine Gael	Gerard Lynch	14.7	5,037	6,581	7,042	7,616	7,715	8,019
Fianna Fáil	Kit Ahern	12.1	4,158	4,218	4,642			
Anti H-Block	Seán McKenna	11.3	3,860	3,917				
Fine Gael	Fionán Harty	6.5	2,227					
Electorate: 42,856 Valid: 34,285 Quota: 8,572 Turnout: 80.0%

=== 1977 general election ===
1977 general election: Kerry North
Party	Candidate	FPv%	Count				
Party	Candidate	FPv%	1	2	3	4	5
Fianna Fáil	Tom McEllistrim, Jnr	21.0	6,964	7,073	9,269		
Fianna Fáil	Kit Ahern	20.3	6,737	6,778	8,885		
Fine Gael	Gerard Lynch	18.7	6,202	7,382	7,651	7,773	7,927
Labour	Dan Spring	18.2	6,046	6,452	7,206	7,803	8,234
Fianna Fáil	Denis Foley	16.1	5,329	5,482			
Fine Gael	John Blennerhassett	5.8	1,920				
Electorate: 43,185 Valid: 33,198 Quota: 8,300 Turnout: 76.9%

=== 1973 general election ===
1973 general election: Kerry North
Party	Candidate	FPv%	Count					
Party	Candidate	FPv%	1	2	3	4	5	6
Fianna Fáil	Tom McEllistrim, Jnr	26.0	7,263					
Labour	Dan Spring	21.0	5,856	6,194	6,236	6,562	7,284	
Fianna Fáil	Kit Ahern	20.7	5,786	5,889	6,108	6,454	6,539	6,578
Fine Gael	Gerard Lynch	16.5	4,592	4,655	4,665	5,591	6,823	7,092
Fine Gael	John Blennerhassett	6.9	1,938	2,021	2,032	2,165		
Independent	John Larkin	6.4	1,773	1,817	1,822			
Independent	Joseph Keohane	2.5	695					
Electorate: 37,018 Valid: 27,903 Quota: 6,976 Turnout: 75.4%

=== 1969 general election ===
1969 general election: Kerry North
Party	Candidate	FPv%	Count				
Party	Candidate	FPv%	1	2	3	4	5
Fianna Fáil	Tom McEllistrim, Jnr	20.6	5,759	6,001	7,182		
Fianna Fáil	Kit Ahern	18.6	5,217	5,620	6,256	6,357	6,380
Labour	Dan Spring	17.5	4,913	5,264	5,865	6,597	6,935
Fine Gael	Gerard Lynch	15.5	4,332	5,266	5,344	7,366	
Fianna Fáil	Michael Scannell	9.8	2,745	2,814			
Fine Gael	John Blennerhassett	9.4	2,628	2,932	3,162		
Independent	Michael Finucane	8.7	2,425				
Electorate: 35,846 Valid: 28,019 Quota: 7,005 Turnout: 78.2%

=== 1965 general election ===
1965 general election: Kerry North
Party	Candidate	FPv%	Count		
Party	Candidate	FPv%	1	2	3
Fianna Fáil	Tom McEllistrim, Snr	28.5	7,561		
Labour	Dan Spring	25.1	6,645		
Independent	Patrick Finucane	19.4	5,147	5,271	7,871
Fine Gael	Edmond Hayes	13.5	3,569	3,656	
Fianna Fáil	Kit Ahern	13.5	3,563	4,291	4,539
Electorate: 34,839 Valid: 26,485 Quota: 6,622 Turnout: 76.0%

=== 1961 general election ===
1961 general election: Kerry North
Party	Candidate	FPv%	Count			
Party	Candidate	FPv%	1	2	3	4
Fianna Fáil	Tom McEllistrim, Snr	21.9	6,195	6,300	6,713	6,903
Independent	Patrick Finucane	20.6	5,827	6,208	6,694	7,564
Labour	Dan Spring	20.4	5,784	6,272	6,764	7,659
Fianna Fáil	Daniel Moloney	18.6	5,262	5,318	5,442	5,576
Fine Gael	Robert Gleasure	6.9	1,963	2,021	2,360	
Independent	Charles Lenihan	6.3	1,777	1,988		
Sinn Féin	Kevin Barry	5.2	1,483			
Electorate: 35,956 Valid: 28,291 Quota: 7,073 Turnout: 78.7%

=== 1957 general election ===
1957 general election: Kerry North
Party	Candidate	FPv%	Count		
Party	Candidate	FPv%	1	2	3
Fianna Fáil	Daniel Moloney	20.2	6,976		
Labour	Dan Spring	18.3	6,292	7,102	
Fianna Fáil	Tom McEllistrim, Snr	18.1	6,231	6,589	6,890
Independent	Patrick Finucane	13.2	4,562	5,334	6,994
Independent	Charles Lenihan	10.8	3,736	4,484	5,655
Fine Gael	John Lynch	10.2	3,499	3,672	
Sinn Féin	May Daly	9.2	3,171		
Electorate: 45,349 Valid: 34,467 Quota: 6,894 Turnout: 76.0%

=== 1956 by-election ===
Following the death of Clann na Poblachta TD Johnny Connor, a by-election was held on 29 February 1956. The seat was won by the Clann na Poblachta candidate Kathleen O'Connor, daughter of the deceased TD.

1956 by-election: Kerry North
Party	Candidate	FPv%	Count
Party	Candidate	FPv%	1
Clann na Poblachta	Kathleen O'Connor	53.5	18,176
Fianna Fáil	Daniel Moloney	46.6	15,828
Electorate: 45,841 Valid: 34,004 Quota: 17,003 Turnout: 74.2%

=== 1954 general election ===
1954 general election: Kerry North
Party	Candidate	FPv%	Count				
Party	Candidate	FPv%	1	2	3	4	5
Fianna Fáil	Tom McEllistrim, Snr	17.7	6,378	8,116			
Labour	Dan Spring	16.3	5,861	6,467	6,561	7,921	
Clann na Talmhan	Patrick Finucane	14.8	5,326	5,548	5,590	7,336	
Clann na Poblachta	Johnny Connor	13.9	5,003	5,175	5,208	6,741	7,421
Fine Gael	John Lynch	13.6	4,904	5,084	5,098		
Fianna Fáil	Eamon Kissane	12.7	4,580	5,464	6,208	6,448	6,500
Fianna Fáil	Maurice Lawlor	10.8	3,890				
Electorate: 46,390 Valid: 35,942 Quota: 7,189 Turnout: 77.5%

=== 1951 general election ===
1951 general election: Kerry North
Party	Candidate	FPv%	Count				
Party	Candidate	FPv%	1	2	3	4	5
Labour	Dan Spring	19.9	7,035	7,631			
Fianna Fáil	Tom McEllistrim, Snr	15.4	5,430	6,927	7,104		
Fine Gael	John Lynch	15.3	5,397	5,544	5,620	7,492	
Fianna Fáil	Eamon Kissane	13.8	4,868	5,661	5,762	6,063	6,106
Independent	Patrick Finucane	13.4	4,714	4,838	4,880	6,451	6,844
Clann na Poblachta	Johnny Connor	12.6	4,446	4,614	4,703		
Fianna Fáil	Thomas O'Connor	9.6	3,389				
Electorate: 46,519 Valid: 35,279 Quota: 7,056 Turnout: 75.8%

=== 1948 general election ===
1948 general election: Kerry North
Party	Candidate	FPv%	Count						
Party	Candidate	FPv%	1	2	3	4	5	6	7
Fianna Fáil	Tom McEllistrim, Snr	21.0	7,555						
Fianna Fáil	Eamon Kissane	17.2	6,214	6,281	6,407	6,533	8,769		
National Labour Party	Dan Spring	16.3	5,877	6,017	6,061	6,698	7,486		
Clann na Talmhan	Patrick Finucane	12.7	4,569	4,914	4,930	5,604	6,088	6,295	6,414
Clann na Poblachta	Johnny Connor	12.2	4,390	5,294	5,314	5,814	6,121	6,232	6,365
Fianna Fáil	Thomas Gega O'Connor	10.5	3,792	3,822	3,949	4,072			
Fine Gael	Jeremiah P. Nolan	5.8	2,108	2,168	2,176				
Clann na Poblachta	Johnny Walsh	4.3	1,564						
Electorate: 48,998 Valid: 36,069 Quota: 7,214 Turnout: 73.6%

=== 1944 general election ===
1944 general election: Kerry North
Party	Candidate	FPv%	Count	
Party	Candidate	FPv%	1	2
Clann na Talmhan	Patrick Finucane	25.8	8,784	
National Labour Party	Dan Spring	24.7	8,429	
Fianna Fáil	Eamon Kissane	20.7	7,047	
Fianna Fáil	Tom McEllistrim, Snr	19.1	6,521	7,830
Fianna Fáil	Patrick McKenna	9.7	3,322	3,976
Electorate: 51,367 Valid: 34,103 Quota: 6,821 Turnout: 66.4%

=== 1943 general election ===
1943 general election: Kerry North
Party	Candidate	FPv%	Count						
Party	Candidate	FPv%	1	2	3	4	5	6	7
Fianna Fáil	Eamon Kissane	17.2	6,551	6,907	8,897				
Fianna Fáil	Tom McEllistrim, Snr	15.7	5,973	6,008	7,021	8,230			
Clann na Talmhan	Patrick Finucane	13.6	5,174	5,329	5,458	5,474	5,505	6,729	6,957
Labour	Dan Spring	13.6	5,155	6,675	6,859	6,896	7,008	8,440	
Clann na Talmhan	Edmund Horan	12.7	4,827	4,847	4,991	5,002	5,021	6,211	6,533
Fine Gael	John O'Sullivan	11.6	4,420	4,553	4,639	4,662	4,735		
Fianna Fáil	Stephen Fuller	9.3	3,550	3,633					
Labour	John Kelly	6.2	2,352						
Electorate: 51,367 Valid: 38,002 Quota: 7,601 Turnout: 74.0%

=== 1938 general election ===
1938 general election: Kerry North
Party	Candidate	FPv%	Count			
Party	Candidate	FPv%	1	2	3	4
Fianna Fáil	Tom McEllistrim, Snr	24.0	8,478			
Fianna Fáil	Stephen Fuller	21.8	7,684			
Fianna Fáil	Eamon Kissane	21.1	7,457			
Fine Gael	John O'Sullivan	15.4	5,432	5,893	6,032	8,568
Labour	William Cummins	9.3	3,273	4,028	4,345	4,701
Fine Gael	Michael O'Connell	8.4	2,976	3,177	3,344	
Electorate: 48,150 Valid: 35,300 Quota: 7,061 Turnout: 73.3%

=== 1937 general election ===
1937 general election: Kerry North
Party	Candidate	FPv%	Count				
Party	Candidate	FPv%	1	2	3	4	5
Fianna Fáil	Eamon Kissane	21.9	7,673				
Fianna Fáil	Tom McEllistrim, Snr	17.7	6,213	6,499	7,583		
Fianna Fáil	Stephen Fuller	17.2	6,019	6,314	8,592		
Fine Gael	John O'Sullivan	14.9	5,204	5,211	5,821	5,957	6,090
Fine Gael	Thomas O'Connell	14.7	5,136	5,167	5,602	5,834	5,923
Labour	Patrick Casey	13.7	4,783	4,831			
Electorate: 48,621 Valid: 35,028 Quota: 7,006 Turnout: 72.0%

== See also ==
- Dáil constituencies
- Politics of the Republic of Ireland
- List of political parties in the Republic of Ireland
- List of Dáil by-elections
- Elections in the Republic of Ireland
