= Denis Foley =

Irish politician (1934–2013)

Teachta Dála
- In office November 1992 – May 2002
- In office June 1981 – June 1989
- Constituency: Kerry North

Senator
- In office 1 November 1989 – 25 November 1992
- Constituency: Industrial and Commercial Panel

Personal details
- Born: 14 May 1934 Tralee, County Kerry, Ireland
- Died: 26 October 2013 (aged 79) Tralee, County Kerry, Ireland
- Party: Fianna Fáil
- Spouse: Hanna Foley (m. 1960)
- Children: 4, including Norma

Denis Foley (14 May 1934 – 26 October 2013) was an Irish Fianna Fáil politician who served as a Teachta Dála (TD) for the Kerry North constituency from 1981 to 1989 and 1992 to 2002 and a Senator for the Industrial and Commercial Panel from 1989 to 1992.

== Biography ==
A former rates collector, in the 1970s, Foley successfully ran The Central Ballroom in Ballybunion and the ballroom of The Brandon Hotel. He also had an interest in The Hillgrove Hotel in Dingle at one stage, and had extensive property holdings in Tralee.

Foley was a member of Kerry County Council from 1979, and was elected to Dáil Éireann at the 1981 general election. He retained his seat through three general elections until his defeat at the 1989 general election by party rival Tom McEllistrim (who, unlike Foley, was a supporter of the then leader of Fianna Fáil, Charles Haughey). He was then elected to the 19th Seanad as a Senator for the Industrial and Commercial Panel, and regained his Dáil seat at the 1992 general election, holding it until he retired at the 2002 general election. His daughter, Norma, unsuccessfully sought the Fianna Fáil nomination to contest the seat in 2002; she was selected for the 2007 general election, but did not win a seat. She stayed in local politics, but won a seat in the Dáil at the 2020 general election for the Kerry constituency.

Following revelations that he had held an offshore account with Ansbacher Bank to avoid tax, Denis Foley resigned from Fianna Fáil on 9 February 2000, becoming an Independent TD. He had previously resigned from the Dáil Public Accounts Committee (on which he had been involved in the questioning of an official of the Ansbacher bank in which he held an undeclared deposit) and in May 2000, he became the first TD to receive a penalty for breaching the Ethics in Public Office Act 1995; he was suspended from the Dáil for 14 days.

He died on 26 October 2013.

== See also ==
- Deposit interest retention tax

Dáil	Election	Deputy (Party)	Deputy (Party)	Deputy (Party)	Deputy (Party)
9th	1937	Stephen Fuller (FF)	Tom McEllistrim, Snr (FF)	John O'Sullivan (FG)	Eamon Kissane (FF)
10th	1938	Stephen Fuller (FF)	Tom McEllistrim, Snr (FF)	John O'Sullivan (FG)	Eamon Kissane (FF)
11th	1943	Dan Spring (Lab)	Tom McEllistrim, Snr (FF)	Patrick Finucane (CnaT)	Eamon Kissane (FF)
12th	1944	Dan Spring (NLP)	Tom McEllistrim, Snr (FF)	Patrick Finucane (CnaT)	Eamon Kissane (FF)
13th	1948	Dan Spring (NLP)	Tom McEllistrim, Snr (FF)	Patrick Finucane (CnaT)	Eamon Kissane (FF)
14th	1951	Dan Spring (Lab)	Tom McEllistrim, Snr (FF)	Patrick Finucane (Ind.)	John Lynch (FG)
15th	1954	Dan Spring (Lab)	Tom McEllistrim, Snr (FF)	Patrick Finucane (CnaT)	Johnny Connor (CnaP)
15th	1956 by-election	Dan Spring (Lab)	Tom McEllistrim, Snr (FF)	Patrick Finucane (CnaT)	Kathleen O'Connor (CnaP)
16th	1957	Dan Spring (Lab)	Tom McEllistrim, Snr (FF)	Patrick Finucane (Ind.)	Daniel Moloney (FF)
17th	1961	Dan Spring (Lab)	Tom McEllistrim, Snr (FF)	Patrick Finucane (Ind.)	3 seats from 1961
18th	1965	Dan Spring (Lab)	Tom McEllistrim, Snr (FF)	Patrick Finucane (Ind.)	3 seats from 1961
19th	1969	Dan Spring (Lab)	Gerard Lynch (FG)	Tom McEllistrim, Jnr (FF)	3 seats from 1961
20th	1973	Dan Spring (Lab)	Gerard Lynch (FG)	Tom McEllistrim, Jnr (FF)	3 seats from 1961
21st	1977	Dan Spring (Lab)	Kit Ahern (FF)	Tom McEllistrim, Jnr (FF)	3 seats from 1961
22nd	1981	Dick Spring (Lab)	Denis Foley (FF)	Tom McEllistrim, Jnr (FF)	3 seats from 1961
23rd	1982 (Feb)	Dick Spring (Lab)	Denis Foley (FF)	Tom McEllistrim, Jnr (FF)	3 seats from 1961
24th	1982 (Nov)	Dick Spring (Lab)	Denis Foley (FF)	Tom McEllistrim, Jnr (FF)	3 seats from 1961
25th	1987	Dick Spring (Lab)	Denis Foley (FF)	Jimmy Deenihan (FG)	3 seats from 1961
26th	1989	Dick Spring (Lab)	Tom McEllistrim, Jnr (FF)	Jimmy Deenihan (FG)	3 seats from 1961
27th	1992	Dick Spring (Lab)	Denis Foley (FF)	Jimmy Deenihan (FG)	3 seats from 1961
28th	1997	Dick Spring (Lab)	Denis Foley (FF)	Jimmy Deenihan (FG)	3 seats from 1961
29th	2002	Martin Ferris (SF)	Tom McEllistrim (FF)	Jimmy Deenihan (FG)	3 seats from 1961
30th	2007	Martin Ferris (SF)	Tom McEllistrim (FF)	Jimmy Deenihan (FG)	3 seats from 1961
31st	2011	Constituency abolished. See Kerry North–West Limerick			
