= Tom McEllistrim (born 1968) =

Irish politician (born 1968)

Kerry County Councillor
- In office May 2014 – May 2019
- Constituency: Tralee

Teachta Dála
- In office May 2002 – February 2011
- Constituency: Kerry North

Personal details
- Born: 24 October 1968 (age 57) Tralee, County Kerry, Ireland
- Party: Independent Ireland (since 2024)
- Other political affiliations: Independent (2023–2024); Fianna Fáil (until 2023)
- Parent: Tom McEllistrim (father)
- Relatives: Tom McEllistrim (grandfather)
- Education: St Patrick's College, Maynooth

Thomas McEllistrim (born 24 October 1968) is an Irish former Fianna Fáil politician who served as a Teachta Dála (TD) for the Kerry North constituency from 2002 to 2011.

A schoolteacher by profession, McEllistrim was first elected to Dáil Éireann at the 2002 general election.

His father, Tom McEllistrim, and his grandfather, also called Tom McEllistrim both served as TDs for Kerry.

McEllistrim lost his Dáil seat at the 2011 general election. He was elected to Kerry County Council for the Tralee local electoral area at the 2014 Kerry County Council election.

In March 2015, McEllistrim sought a Dáil nomination for Fianna Fáil for the new Kerry constituency but was defeated at the convention by fellow County Councillor, John Brassil. He contested the Seanad Éireann elections in April 2016 for the Industrial and Commercial Panel, but was again unsuccessful. He lost his council seat at the 2019 Kerry County Council election.

He ran as an independent candidate at the 2024 Kerry County Council election, but was not elected.

In October 2024, he announced that he would contest the 2024 general election as an Independent Ireland candidate for the Kerry constituency.

== See also ==
- Families in the Oireachtas

Dáil	Election	Deputy (Party)	Deputy (Party)	Deputy (Party)	Deputy (Party)
9th	1937	Stephen Fuller (FF)	Tom McEllistrim, Snr (FF)	John O'Sullivan (FG)	Eamon Kissane (FF)
10th	1938	Stephen Fuller (FF)	Tom McEllistrim, Snr (FF)	John O'Sullivan (FG)	Eamon Kissane (FF)
11th	1943	Dan Spring (Lab)	Tom McEllistrim, Snr (FF)	Patrick Finucane (CnaT)	Eamon Kissane (FF)
12th	1944	Dan Spring (NLP)	Tom McEllistrim, Snr (FF)	Patrick Finucane (CnaT)	Eamon Kissane (FF)
13th	1948	Dan Spring (NLP)	Tom McEllistrim, Snr (FF)	Patrick Finucane (CnaT)	Eamon Kissane (FF)
14th	1951	Dan Spring (Lab)	Tom McEllistrim, Snr (FF)	Patrick Finucane (Ind.)	John Lynch (FG)
15th	1954	Dan Spring (Lab)	Tom McEllistrim, Snr (FF)	Patrick Finucane (CnaT)	Johnny Connor (CnaP)
15th	1956 by-election	Dan Spring (Lab)	Tom McEllistrim, Snr (FF)	Patrick Finucane (CnaT)	Kathleen O'Connor (CnaP)
16th	1957	Dan Spring (Lab)	Tom McEllistrim, Snr (FF)	Patrick Finucane (Ind.)	Daniel Moloney (FF)
17th	1961	Dan Spring (Lab)	Tom McEllistrim, Snr (FF)	Patrick Finucane (Ind.)	3 seats from 1961
18th	1965	Dan Spring (Lab)	Tom McEllistrim, Snr (FF)	Patrick Finucane (Ind.)	3 seats from 1961
19th	1969	Dan Spring (Lab)	Gerard Lynch (FG)	Tom McEllistrim, Jnr (FF)	3 seats from 1961
20th	1973	Dan Spring (Lab)	Gerard Lynch (FG)	Tom McEllistrim, Jnr (FF)	3 seats from 1961
21st	1977	Dan Spring (Lab)	Kit Ahern (FF)	Tom McEllistrim, Jnr (FF)	3 seats from 1961
22nd	1981	Dick Spring (Lab)	Denis Foley (FF)	Tom McEllistrim, Jnr (FF)	3 seats from 1961
23rd	1982 (Feb)	Dick Spring (Lab)	Denis Foley (FF)	Tom McEllistrim, Jnr (FF)	3 seats from 1961
24th	1982 (Nov)	Dick Spring (Lab)	Denis Foley (FF)	Tom McEllistrim, Jnr (FF)	3 seats from 1961
25th	1987	Dick Spring (Lab)	Denis Foley (FF)	Jimmy Deenihan (FG)	3 seats from 1961
26th	1989	Dick Spring (Lab)	Tom McEllistrim, Jnr (FF)	Jimmy Deenihan (FG)	3 seats from 1961
27th	1992	Dick Spring (Lab)	Denis Foley (FF)	Jimmy Deenihan (FG)	3 seats from 1961
28th	1997	Dick Spring (Lab)	Denis Foley (FF)	Jimmy Deenihan (FG)	3 seats from 1961
29th	2002	Martin Ferris (SF)	Tom McEllistrim (FF)	Jimmy Deenihan (FG)	3 seats from 1961
30th	2007	Martin Ferris (SF)	Tom McEllistrim (FF)	Jimmy Deenihan (FG)	3 seats from 1961
31st	2011	Constituency abolished. See Kerry North–West Limerick			
