= Patrick Finucane (Irish politician) =

Irish politician (1890–1984)

Teachta Dála
- In office June 1943 – June 1969
- Constituency: Kerry North

Personal details
- Born: 5 December 1890 Moyvane, County Kerry, Ireland
- Died: 10 April 1984 (aged 84) Tralee, County Kerry, Ireland
- Party: Clann na Talmhan
- Other political affiliations: Independent

Patrick Finucane (5 December 1899 – 10 April 1984) was an Irish Clann na Talmhan politician who served as a Teachta Dála (TD) for the Kerry North constituency from 1943 to 1969.

Born on a family farm at Prohus, Moyvane, County Kerry, he was the eldest of nine children. In 1917 he joined the Irish Volunteers and took part in the Irish War of Independence. Following the split on the Anglo-Irish Treaty, he took the anti-treaty side.

He married and had a farm at Urlee, Lisselton. He was involved in farming organisations and in 1942 was elected to Kerry County Council.

He was chosen to contest the 1943 general election by the Kerry Farmers' Association. and was elected as a TD for the Kerry North constituency. He subsequently joined Clann na Talmhan, sitting on the opposition benches. He was re-elected at the 1944 and 1948 general elections. Clann na Talmhan was part of the Inter Party Government formed after the election. Finucane resigned from the party on 28 April 1951 in protest at the treatment of dairy farmers. He was elected as an Independent TD at the 1951 general election, he returned to Clann na Talmhan at the 1954 general election, but sat again as an independent from the 1957 general election. Two weeks after his re-election 1965 he had an accident and suffered a serious head injury. After being in a coma for three weeks he never fully recovered and retired at the 1969 general election.

| Dáil | Election | Deputy (Party) | Deputy (Party) | Deputy (Party) | Deputy (Party) |
|---|---|---|---|---|---|
| 9th | 1937 | Stephen Fuller (FF) | Tom McEllistrim, Snr (FF) | John O'Sullivan (FG) | Eamon Kissane (FF) |
| 10th | 1938 | Stephen Fuller (FF) | Tom McEllistrim, Snr (FF) | John O'Sullivan (FG) | Eamon Kissane (FF) |
| 11th | 1943 | Dan Spring (Lab) | Tom McEllistrim, Snr (FF) | Patrick Finucane (CnaT) | Eamon Kissane (FF) |
| 12th | 1944 | Dan Spring (NLP) | Tom McEllistrim, Snr (FF) | Patrick Finucane (CnaT) | Eamon Kissane (FF) |
| 13th | 1948 | Dan Spring (NLP) | Tom McEllistrim, Snr (FF) | Patrick Finucane (CnaT) | Eamon Kissane (FF) |
| 14th | 1951 | Dan Spring (Lab) | Tom McEllistrim, Snr (FF) | Patrick Finucane (Ind.) | John Lynch (FG) |
| 15th | 1954 | Dan Spring (Lab) | Tom McEllistrim, Snr (FF) | Patrick Finucane (CnaT) | Johnny Connor (CnaP) |
| 15th | 1956 by-election | Dan Spring (Lab) | Tom McEllistrim, Snr (FF) | Patrick Finucane (CnaT) | Kathleen O'Connor (CnaP) |
| 16th | 1957 | Dan Spring (Lab) | Tom McEllistrim, Snr (FF) | Patrick Finucane (Ind.) | Daniel Moloney (FF) |
| 17th | 1961 | Dan Spring (Lab) | Tom McEllistrim, Snr (FF) | Patrick Finucane (Ind.) | 3 seats from 1961 |
| 18th | 1965 | Dan Spring (Lab) | Tom McEllistrim, Snr (FF) | Patrick Finucane (Ind.) | 3 seats from 1961 |
| 19th | 1969 | Dan Spring (Lab) | Gerard Lynch (FG) | Tom McEllistrim, Jnr (FF) | 3 seats from 1961 |
| 20th | 1973 | Dan Spring (Lab) | Gerard Lynch (FG) | Tom McEllistrim, Jnr (FF) | 3 seats from 1961 |
| 21st | 1977 | Dan Spring (Lab) | Kit Ahern (FF) | Tom McEllistrim, Jnr (FF) | 3 seats from 1961 |
| 22nd | 1981 | Dick Spring (Lab) | Denis Foley (FF) | Tom McEllistrim, Jnr (FF) | 3 seats from 1961 |
| 23rd | 1982 (Feb) | Dick Spring (Lab) | Denis Foley (FF) | Tom McEllistrim, Jnr (FF) | 3 seats from 1961 |
| 24th | 1982 (Nov) | Dick Spring (Lab) | Denis Foley (FF) | Tom McEllistrim, Jnr (FF) | 3 seats from 1961 |
| 25th | 1987 | Dick Spring (Lab) | Denis Foley (FF) | Jimmy Deenihan (FG) | 3 seats from 1961 |
| 26th | 1989 | Dick Spring (Lab) | Tom McEllistrim, Jnr (FF) | Jimmy Deenihan (FG) | 3 seats from 1961 |
| 27th | 1992 | Dick Spring (Lab) | Denis Foley (FF) | Jimmy Deenihan (FG) | 3 seats from 1961 |
| 28th | 1997 | Dick Spring (Lab) | Denis Foley (FF) | Jimmy Deenihan (FG) | 3 seats from 1961 |
| 29th | 2002 | Martin Ferris (SF) | Tom McEllistrim (FF) | Jimmy Deenihan (FG) | 3 seats from 1961 |
| 30th | 2007 | Martin Ferris (SF) | Tom McEllistrim (FF) | Jimmy Deenihan (FG) | 3 seats from 1961 |
| 31st | 2011 | Constituency abolished. See Kerry North–West Limerick | | | |
