= Tom McEllistrim (1894–1973) =

Irish politician (1894–1973)

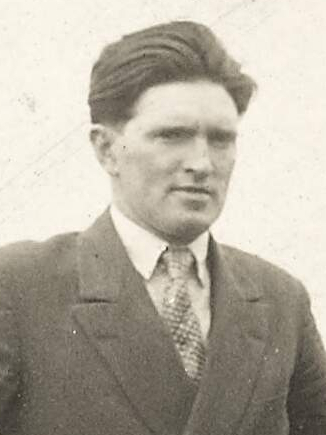
- McEllistrim in 1927

Teachta Dála
- In office July 1937 – June 1969
- Constituency: Kerry North
- In office August 1923 – July 1937
- Constituency: Kerry

Personal details
- Born: 14 October 1894 Listowel, County Kerry, Ireland
- Died: 4 December 1973 (aged 79) Tralee, County Kerry, Ireland
- Party: Fianna Fáil
- Spouse: Sheila Leary (m. 1919)
- Relations: Tom McEllistrim (grandson)
- Children: 3, including Tom

Military service
- Allegiance: Irish Republican Brotherhood; Irish Volunteers; Irish Republican Army; Anti-Treaty IRA
- Years of service: 1916–1923
- Battles/wars: Irish War of Independence; Irish Civil War

Thomas McEllistrim (14 October 1894 – 4 December 1973) was an Irish Fianna Fáil politician who served as a Teachta Dála (TD) from 1923 to 1969. He was a military activist in the period from 1916 to 1923.

== Guerrilla fighter ==
He joined the Ballymacelligott company of the Irish Volunteers in 1914 and was involved in an abortive attempt by Roger Casement to land arms for the Easter Rising at Banna Strand in County Kerry. After the rebellion he was interned by the British at Frongoch internment camp in Wales for his role in the events. In April 1918, he led an arms raid on Gortatlea Royal Irish Constabulary barracks in which two Volunteers were killed. It was one of the first acts of guerrilla warfare in the period.

McEllistrim served in the Irish Republican Army in Kerry throughout the Irish War of Independence of 1919 to 1921. He was instrumental in the setting up of first an Active service unit (in June 1920) and then a larger "flying column", or full-time guerrilla unit in the IRA's Second Kerry Brigade in early 1921. His column fought in both the Clonbanin Ambush and the Headford Ambush in the spring of 1921. At the latter action, in which the IRA ambushed a train carrying British troops, Dan Allman, the leader of the flying column was killed, leaving McEllistrim in command.

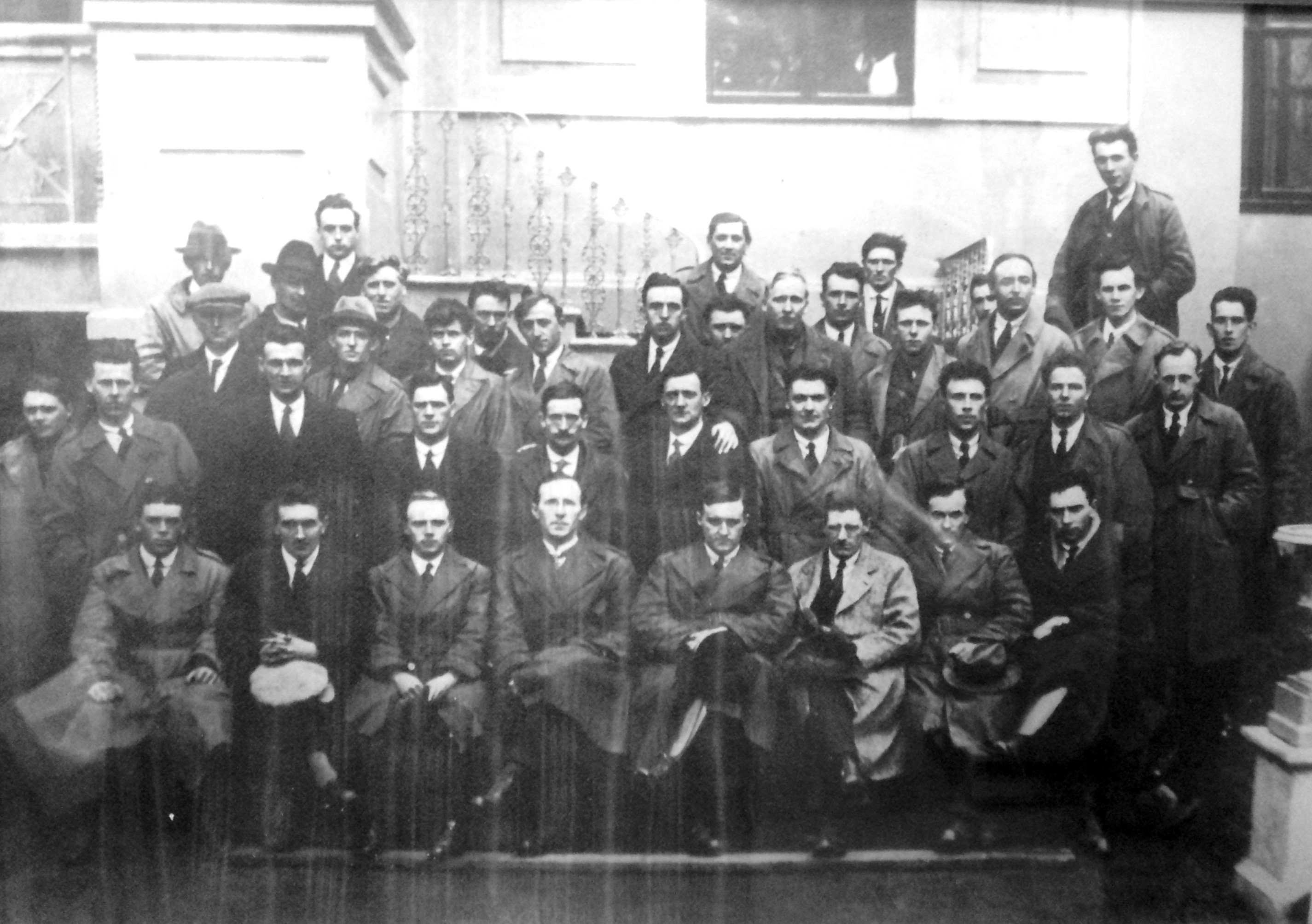
Liam Lynch with some of his divisional staff and officers of the brigades, including the 1st Southern Division, who attended as delegates to the Anti-Treaty Army Convention at the Mansion House, Dublin, on 9 April 1922. Tom McEllistrim is 2nd from right at the very back

According to historian T. Ryle Dwyer, "McEllistrim arguably played as important a role in the War of Independence as Tom Barry or Dan Breen but he never wrote a book about his exploits, nor was he prepared to talk about them publicly... Even though McEllistrim sat in the Dáil for over forty years, he apparently never mentioned the period in Leinster House".

He rejected the Anglo-Irish Treaty and fought in the Anti-Treaty IRA during the Irish Civil War of 1922 to 1923. He was one of the senior IRA figures in Kerry during this conflict, under the command of Humphrey Murphy. In the war's early months, he commanded a Kerry column in the fighting in Limerick and at the Battle of Kilmallock, before retreating back into Kerry and pursuing guerrilla warfare. In January 1923, he, along with John Joe Sheehy, led an attack on the National Army barracks at Castlemaine, using an improvised mortar.

== Political career ==
McEllistrim was elected to the Dáil as a TD for Kerry in August 1923, only months after the end of the civil war, as a republican candidate. He came third in the county with 7,277 votes. He remained a TD for the Kerry constituency, and later of Kerry North from 1926 to 1969. After 1926, he followed much the republican leadership into Fianna Fáil. His son, Tom McEllistrim, and his grandson, also Tom McEllistrim also represented the Kerry North constituency.

== See also ==
- Families in the Oireachtas

| Dáil | Election | Deputy (Party) | Deputy (Party) | Deputy (Party) | Deputy (Party) | Deputy (Party) | Deputy (Party) | Deputy (Party) |
|---|---|---|---|---|---|---|---|---|
| 4th | 1923 | Tom McEllistrim (Rep) | Austin Stack (Rep) | Patrick Cahill (Rep) | Thomas O'Donoghue (Rep) | James Crowley (CnaG) | Fionán Lynch (CnaG) | John O'Sullivan (CnaG) |
| 5th | 1927 (Jun) | Tom McEllistrim (FF) | Austin Stack (SF) | William O'Leary (FF) | Thomas O'Reilly (FF) | James Crowley (CnaG) | Fionán Lynch (CnaG) | John O'Sullivan (CnaG) |
| 6th | 1927 (Sep) | Tom McEllistrim (FF) | Frederick Crowley (FF) | William O'Leary (FF) | Thomas O'Reilly (FF) | James Crowley (CnaG) | Fionán Lynch (CnaG) | John O'Sullivan (CnaG) |
| 7th | 1932 | Tom McEllistrim (FF) | Frederick Crowley (FF) | John Flynn (FF) | Thomas O'Reilly (FF) | Eamon Kissane (FF) | Fionán Lynch (CnaG) | John O'Sullivan (CnaG) |
| 8th | 1933 | Tom McEllistrim (FF) | Frederick Crowley (FF) | John Flynn (FF) | Denis Daly (FF) | Eamon Kissane (FF) | Fionán Lynch (CnaG) | John O'Sullivan (CnaG) |
| 9th | 1937 | Constituency abolished. See Kerry North and Kerry South | | | | | | |

| Dáil | Election | Deputy (Party) | Deputy (Party) | Deputy (Party) | Deputy (Party) | Deputy (Party) |
|---|---|---|---|---|---|---|
| 32nd | 2016 | Martin Ferris (SF) | Michael Healy-Rae (Ind.) | Danny Healy-Rae (Ind.) | John Brassil (FF) | Brendan Griffin (FG) |
| 33rd | 2020 | Pa Daly (SF) | Michael Healy-Rae (Ind.) | Danny Healy-Rae (Ind.) | Norma Foley (FF) | Brendan Griffin (FG) |
| 34th | 2024 | Pa Daly (SF) | Michael Healy-Rae (Ind.) | Danny Healy-Rae (Ind.) | Norma Foley (FF) | Michael Cahill (FF) |

| Dáil | Election | Deputy (Party) | Deputy (Party) | Deputy (Party) | Deputy (Party) |
|---|---|---|---|---|---|
| 9th | 1937 | Stephen Fuller (FF) | Tom McEllistrim, Snr (FF) | John O'Sullivan (FG) | Eamon Kissane (FF) |
| 10th | 1938 | Stephen Fuller (FF) | Tom McEllistrim, Snr (FF) | John O'Sullivan (FG) | Eamon Kissane (FF) |
| 11th | 1943 | Dan Spring (Lab) | Tom McEllistrim, Snr (FF) | Patrick Finucane (CnaT) | Eamon Kissane (FF) |
| 12th | 1944 | Dan Spring (NLP) | Tom McEllistrim, Snr (FF) | Patrick Finucane (CnaT) | Eamon Kissane (FF) |
| 13th | 1948 | Dan Spring (NLP) | Tom McEllistrim, Snr (FF) | Patrick Finucane (CnaT) | Eamon Kissane (FF) |
| 14th | 1951 | Dan Spring (Lab) | Tom McEllistrim, Snr (FF) | Patrick Finucane (Ind.) | John Lynch (FG) |
| 15th | 1954 | Dan Spring (Lab) | Tom McEllistrim, Snr (FF) | Patrick Finucane (CnaT) | Johnny Connor (CnaP) |
| 15th | 1956 by-election | Dan Spring (Lab) | Tom McEllistrim, Snr (FF) | Patrick Finucane (CnaT) | Kathleen O'Connor (CnaP) |
| 16th | 1957 | Dan Spring (Lab) | Tom McEllistrim, Snr (FF) | Patrick Finucane (Ind.) | Daniel Moloney (FF) |
| 17th | 1961 | Dan Spring (Lab) | Tom McEllistrim, Snr (FF) | Patrick Finucane (Ind.) | 3 seats from 1961 |
| 18th | 1965 | Dan Spring (Lab) | Tom McEllistrim, Snr (FF) | Patrick Finucane (Ind.) | 3 seats from 1961 |
| 19th | 1969 | Dan Spring (Lab) | Gerard Lynch (FG) | Tom McEllistrim, Jnr (FF) | 3 seats from 1961 |
| 20th | 1973 | Dan Spring (Lab) | Gerard Lynch (FG) | Tom McEllistrim, Jnr (FF) | 3 seats from 1961 |
| 21st | 1977 | Dan Spring (Lab) | Kit Ahern (FF) | Tom McEllistrim, Jnr (FF) | 3 seats from 1961 |
| 22nd | 1981 | Dick Spring (Lab) | Denis Foley (FF) | Tom McEllistrim, Jnr (FF) | 3 seats from 1961 |
| 23rd | 1982 (Feb) | Dick Spring (Lab) | Denis Foley (FF) | Tom McEllistrim, Jnr (FF) | 3 seats from 1961 |
| 24th | 1982 (Nov) | Dick Spring (Lab) | Denis Foley (FF) | Tom McEllistrim, Jnr (FF) | 3 seats from 1961 |
| 25th | 1987 | Dick Spring (Lab) | Denis Foley (FF) | Jimmy Deenihan (FG) | 3 seats from 1961 |
| 26th | 1989 | Dick Spring (Lab) | Tom McEllistrim, Jnr (FF) | Jimmy Deenihan (FG) | 3 seats from 1961 |
| 27th | 1992 | Dick Spring (Lab) | Denis Foley (FF) | Jimmy Deenihan (FG) | 3 seats from 1961 |
| 28th | 1997 | Dick Spring (Lab) | Denis Foley (FF) | Jimmy Deenihan (FG) | 3 seats from 1961 |
| 29th | 2002 | Martin Ferris (SF) | Tom McEllistrim (FF) | Jimmy Deenihan (FG) | 3 seats from 1961 |
| 30th | 2007 | Martin Ferris (SF) | Tom McEllistrim (FF) | Jimmy Deenihan (FG) | 3 seats from 1961 |
| 31st | 2011 | Constituency abolished. See Kerry North–West Limerick | | | |
