= Liam O'Flaherty (footballer) =

Irish Gaelic footballer

Personal information
- Born: Lisselton, County Kerry

Sport
- Sport: Gaelic football
- Position: Half back
Club
- Years: Club
- 1980s-2000s: Ballydonoghue
Club titles
- Kerry titles: 0
- Munster titles: 0
- All-Ireland Titles: 0
Inter-county
Years	County	Apps (scores)
1991-1998	Kerry	18 (0-01)
Inter-county titles
- Munster titles: 3
- All-Irelands: 1
- NFL: 1

Liam O'Flaherty was a footballer from Ballydonoghue in North County Kerry, Ireland. He played with Ballydonoghue and Kerry intercounty teams in the late 1980s till the late 1990s. He won an All Ireland Senior medal in 1997, he won a Minor All Ireland in 1988 and Under 21 Medal in 1990.

== Club ==
At club level O'Flanerty played with Ballydonoghue and Shannon Rangers. He won a North Kerry Senior Football Championship when them in 1992. He had little success with Shannon Rangers, the closest being a Runner-up in the Kerry Under 21 Championship in 1989.

== Minor ==
He joined the Kerry minor team in 1988. Wins over Waterford, Limerick and Cork seen him win a Munster title. Kerry later faced Dublin in the All-Ireland final, a 2-05 to 0-05 win seen O'Flaherty win an All-Ireland medal.

== Under 21 ==
O'Flaherty moved on the county Under 21 team in 1990. A win over Cork seen O'Flaherty pick up a Munster Under-21 Football Championship after a 2-09 to 0-09 win. An All-Ireland semi-final win over Galway seen Kerry qualify for the final. In the final O'Flaherty and co faced Ulster champions Tyrone. Goals proved to be the difference as The Kingdom hit the Ulster men for 5, in a 5-12 to 2-11 win. It gave O'Flaherty an All-Ireland Under 21 title.

He was underage again in 1991 and had more success. A win over Cork seen O'Flaherty pick up a second Munster Under-21 Football Championship. A win over Meath in the All-Ireland semi-final seen O'Flahery and co back in the All-Ireland final. It was a repeat of the 1990 final as Kerry faced Tyrone. While goals won it for Kerry the year before it was the other way around this time as Tyrone hit Kerry for 4 in a 4-16 to 1-05 loss for O'Flaherys side.

== Junior ==
After a few season away from the intercounty game O'Flaherty made a surprise return when he lined out with the Kerry Junior team in 2001. His return was short lived as Kerry had a surprise loss to Tipperary.

== Senior ==
On the back of his underage displays O'Flahery joined the Kerry senior team during the 1990–91 National Football League. He made his Munster Senior Football Championship debut against Clare in the Quarter-Final. He lined out in the semi-final win over Cork later in the summer. He played no part as Kerry overcame Limerick in the Munster final of All-Ireland semi-final loss to Down.

He was more of a regular during the 1991–92 National Football League playing in all of Kerrys. Wins over Limerick and Cork seen Kerry qualify for a Munster final with Clare. In his first senior final O'Flaherty expected to add a Munster medal to his collection. However in one of the all time championship shocks Clare took the title on a 2-10 to 0-12 scoreline.

The next few seasons would be difficult for both Kerry. In 1993 Kerry season ended after only one game as they lost to Cork. While his only championship game in 1994 was another loss to Cork in a game when he scored his only championship point.

Wins over Limerick and Tipperary seen Kerry qualify for a first Munster final since 1992. O'Flaherty lined out at midfield as Kerry faced Cork, however in the end the title sent to the Rebels.

He missed out on the whole 1995–96 National Football League. His only championship appearance was as a sub during the Munster semi-final win over Waterford but missed out on the Munster final win over Cork.

He played all but one of Kerrys 1996–97 National Football League as Kerry took the title after a final win over Cork. A Munster semi-final was over Tipperary seen Kerry qualify for the final where they faced Clare. O'Flaherty had lined out in the 1992 Munster final when Clare socked his side, however this time there was no such surprise as O'Flaherty picked up his first Munster Senior Football Championship title after a 1-17 to 1-10 scoreline. A win over Cavan in the All-Ireland semi-final seen Kerry qualify for a first All-Ireland final since 1986. In the final O'Flaherty lined out at Center Back against Mayo. A masterclass from Maurice Fitzgerald seen Kerry take the title on a 0-13 to 1-07 scoreline and an All-Ireland medal for O'Flaherty.

By 1998 O'Flaherty was a cert for Kerry at Center Back and at 28 years old was coming into his prime. A Munster semi-final win over Cork seen Kerry qualify for another Munster final. For the first time in his senior career he lined out in back to back Munster finals where Kerry faced Tipperary. He won a second Munster title after a 0-17 to 1-10 win. In the All-Ireland semi-final Kerry faced Kildare, who were trained by Kerry legend Mick O'Dwyer, in Corke Park. While Kerry were expected to qualify for a second All-Ireland final in a row, it was the Leinster champions who had a surprise 0-13 to 1-09 win. The game would turn out to be O'Flahertys last championship outing with The Kingdom.

Kery found themselves in Division 2 of the 1998–99 National Football League. Despite this Kerry made it to the knock out stage and the Quarter-final where they faced Meath. O'Flaherty lined out for the first time of the season, but couldn't help his side as they lost out on a 0-14 to 0-10 scoreline. The game would turn out to be his last at senior level with Kerry.
