= Shannon Rangers GAA =

North Kerry Divisional Gaelic football team in County Kerry, Ireland

- Raonaithe na Sionainne
- Founded: 1940
- County: Kerry
- Colours: Blue and White

Playing kits
First kit	Second kit

Senior Club Championships
	All Ireland	Munster champions	Kerry champions
Football:	0	1	5

Shannon Rangers is a North Kerry Divisional Gaelic football team in County Kerry, Ireland, based around the Shannon Estuary. Founded in 1940, the team compete in the Kerry Senior Football Championship, which they have won on 5 occasions. They also won the inaugural Munster Senior Club Football Championship in 1964.

== Member clubs ==
The team is selected from the following clubs:

- Asdee
- Ballydonoghue
- Ballyduff
- Ballylongford
- Beale
- Tarbert

== History ==
The Shannon Rangers club was formed in 1940, when a number of clubs (Ballybunion, Ballydonoghue, Ballylongford, Craughdarrig and Tarbert) decided to form their own team and break away from the then North Kerry divisional side to compete separately in the Kerry Senior Football Championship. In their first year in the Championship they reached the semi-finals, and lost to eventual winners Dingle. The following year they reached the semi-finals again but lost to John Mitchels after a replay.

In 1942 Rangers won the County Championship for the first time when they defeated John Mitchels 2–4 to 1–3 in the final. They reached the final again in 1945 and were victorious again, defeating Killarney Legion 1–7 to 5pts after a replay. Over the following decade they would lose three finals before winning again in 1964. In 1948 they lost to Dingle, in 1953 they lost to Kerins O'Rahilly's and in 1955 they lost to South Kerry. The following year Shannon Rangers didn't enter the Championship as Feale Rangers represented all of North Kerry. It wasn't until 1964, when Listowel, Moyvane and Tarbert broke away from Feale Rangers to form St. Vincents that the remaining clubs reformed Shannon Rangers to enter the Championship.

The new Shannon Rangers were immediately successful, as after beating Castleisland (District) in the quarter-final, South Kerry in the semi-final they then defeated East Kerry 1–10 to 1–5 in the final of the 1964 Kerry Senior Football Championship to win their third title. This victory meant that Rangers would now go on to represent Kerry in the inaugural Munster Senior Club Football Championship. In the Munster quarter-final they defeated Ballysteen of Limerick 5–9 to 4pts and then beat Kilrossanty of Waterford by 2–11 to 5pts in the semi-final. In the final, played at Limerick's Gaelic Grounds they defeated Cooraclare of Clare 2–7 to 4pts. The Shannon Rangers team on the day was: Alan Kennelly (Ballylongford), Tom O'Sullivan (Finuge), Paudie O'Donoghue (Ballylongford), Mike Joe Quinlan (Ballyduff), John Mulvihill (Clounmacon), John McCarthy (Ballylongford), Michael Mulvihill (Ballydonoghue), Jer D. O'Connor (Ballydonoghue), Mick Walsh (Ballylongford), Brian McCarthy (Ballylongford), Tony Barrett (Ballyduff), Teddy O'Sullivan (Ballyduff), Éamonn O’Donoghue (Ballylongford), Ritchard Carey (Finuge), Billy Doran (Duagh).

Shannon Rangers' next appearance in the Kerry Senior Football Championship final was in 1971 when they lost to Mid Kerry after a replay, but returned to the final the following year against the same opposition and won by 2–08 to 1–07. Their next final appearance was in 1974 when they lost to Kenmare. Rangers reached the semi-finals of the county championship in 1975 and again in 1976.

In 1976 Tarbert left Shannon Rangers to join Feale Rangers, with Ballydonoghue doing likewise in 1977. Despite losing these clubs, Rangers reached the final for the tenth time in 1977 with players from just Ballylongford and Beale. They played neighbours Feale Rangers in the final and won the match (their fifth title) by 10pts to 6. The following year they would meet Feale Rangers again, this time losing at the semi-final stage. In each of the next five Championships (1979 - 1983) they would reach the semi-finals again, losing on each occasion. Since 1983, Rangers' only semi-final appearance came in 2014 which they lost to Mid Kerry.

=== Minors ===
At minor level Shannon Rangers have won the Kerry Minor Football Championship on three occasions; 1973, 1974 and 1991.

== Honours ==
- Munster Senior Club Football Championship

Winners: 1964

- Kerry Senior Football Championship

Winners: 1942, 1945, 1964, 1972, 1977
Runners-Up: 1948, 1953, 1955, 1971, 1974

- Kerry Under-21 Football Championship

Runners-Up: 1989, 1993

- Kerry Minor Football Championship

Winners: 1973, 1974, 1991
Runners-Up: 1965, 1997

== Notable players ==
- Johnny Bunyan
- Gus Cremin
- Kieran Culhane
- Shane Enright
- Mick Finucane
- Jason Foley
- Paddy Kelly
- John Kennedy
- Eoin 'Bomber' Liston
- Denis 'Ogie' Moran
- Jer D. O'Connor
- Éamonn O’Donoghue
- Paudie O'Donoghue
- Liam O'Flaherty
- Colin O'Mahony
- Johnny Walsh

== Divisional competitions ==
- North Kerry Senior Football Championship
