= Éamonn O'Donoghue =

Éamonn O'Donoghue may refer to:

- Éamonn O'Donoghue (hurler) (born 1951), Irish retired hurler
- Éamonn O'Donoghue (Gaelic footballer) (born 1946), Irish Gaelic footballer
