= Lislaughtin Abbey =

- Mainistir Lios Laichtín
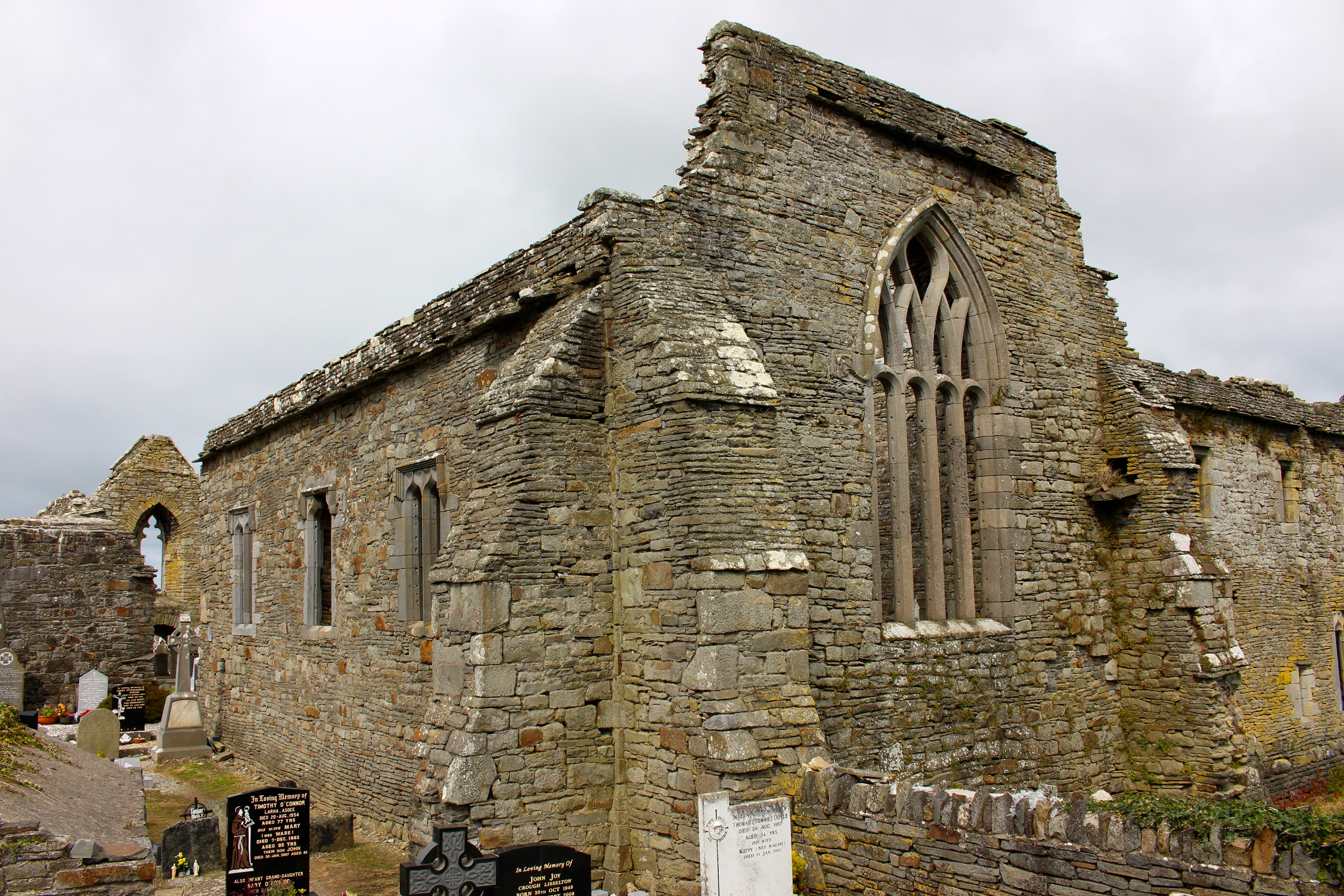
- Ruins of the abbey church

- Location within Ireland
- Interactive map of Lislaughtin Abbey

Monastery information
- Other names: Leasa-lauchtin; Lislachtin; Hilleanbegha; Leslaughty
- Order: Order of Friars Minor
- Established: 1470–77
- Disestablished: 1580
- Diocese: Ardfert and Aghadoe

People
- Founder: John O'Connor, Lord of Iraghticonnor

Architecture
- Status: Inactive
- Style: Late Gothic

Site
- Location: Lislaughtin, Ballylongford, County Kerry
- Coordinates: 52.557367°N 9.469933°W
- Visible remains: abbey church (unroofed); dormitory/refectory; collapsed tower; garderobe
- Public access: yes

Lislaughtin Abbey is a medieval Franciscan friary and National Monument located in County Kerry, Ireland.

== Location ==
Lislaughtin Abbey is located 1.3 kilometres (0.81 mi) north of Ballylongford, on the east bank of the Ballylongford Creek and to the south of the Shannon Estuary.

== History ==
The friary was founded for the Order of Friars Minor (Observant Franciscan Friars) in 1470 by John O'Connor, Lord of Kerry Luachra and Iraghticonnor. Permission was granted by Pope Sixtus IV in 1477. It was named after Saint Lachtin (died AD 622) who brought Christianity to the area. A silver processional cross was commissioned in 1479; it is now known as the Lislaughtin or Ballymacasey cross and is held at the National Museum of Ireland – Archaeology.

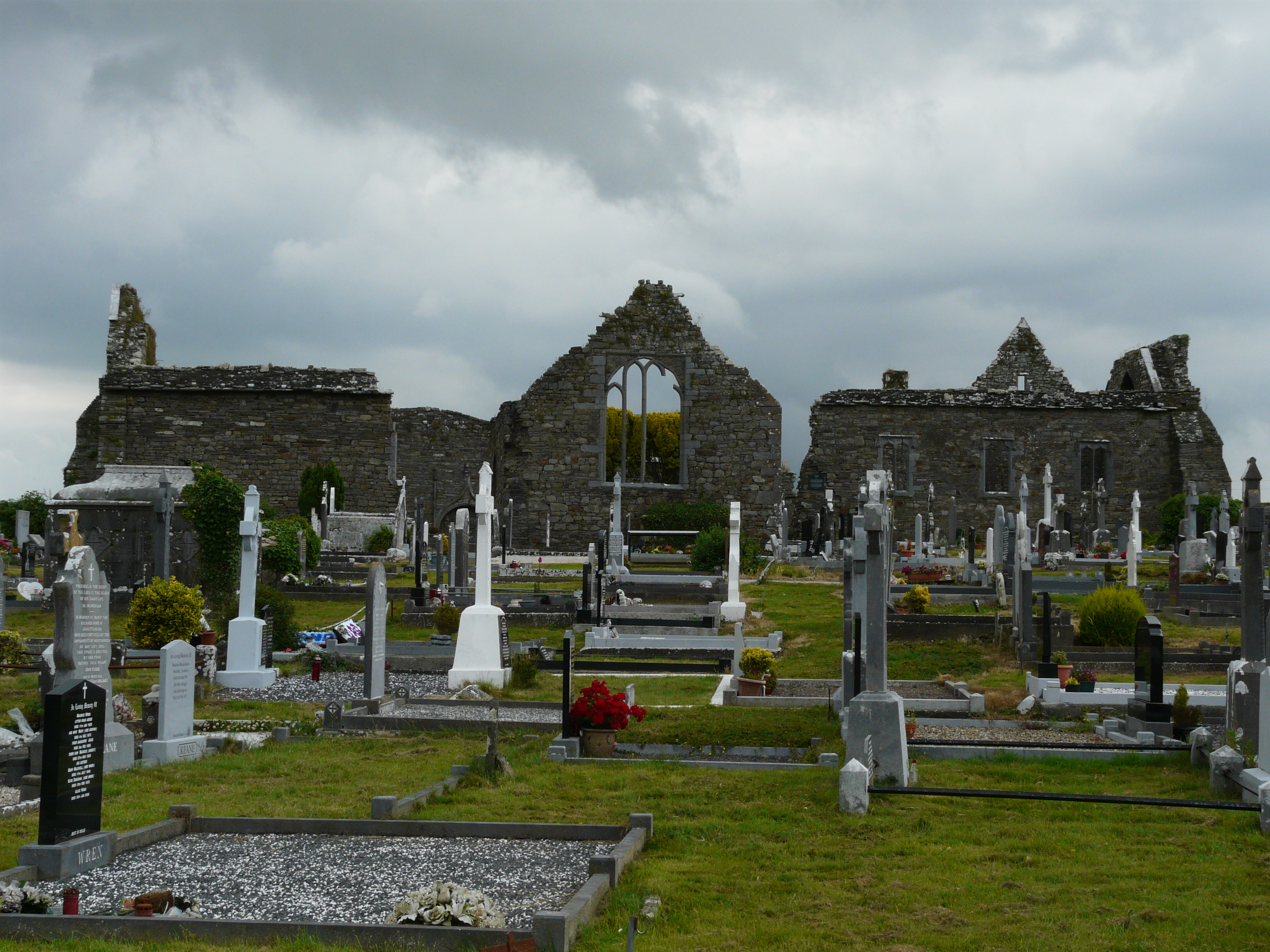
Side view of the abbey: church on left and refectory/dormitory on the right

Lord Iraghticonnor was buried at the friary in 1485. Thomas fitz Gerald, heir of the Knight of Glin, was buried there in 1567 after his execution.

During the Siege of Carrigafoyle Castle (1580) the abbey was twice raided by English soldiers. The abbey was then dissolved, although the church and graveyard remained in use by the local Catholic population, and some friars returned in 1629. During one of these attacks the Lislaughtin cross was buried for safety, and it was found by a local farmer in March 1871.

== Buildings ==
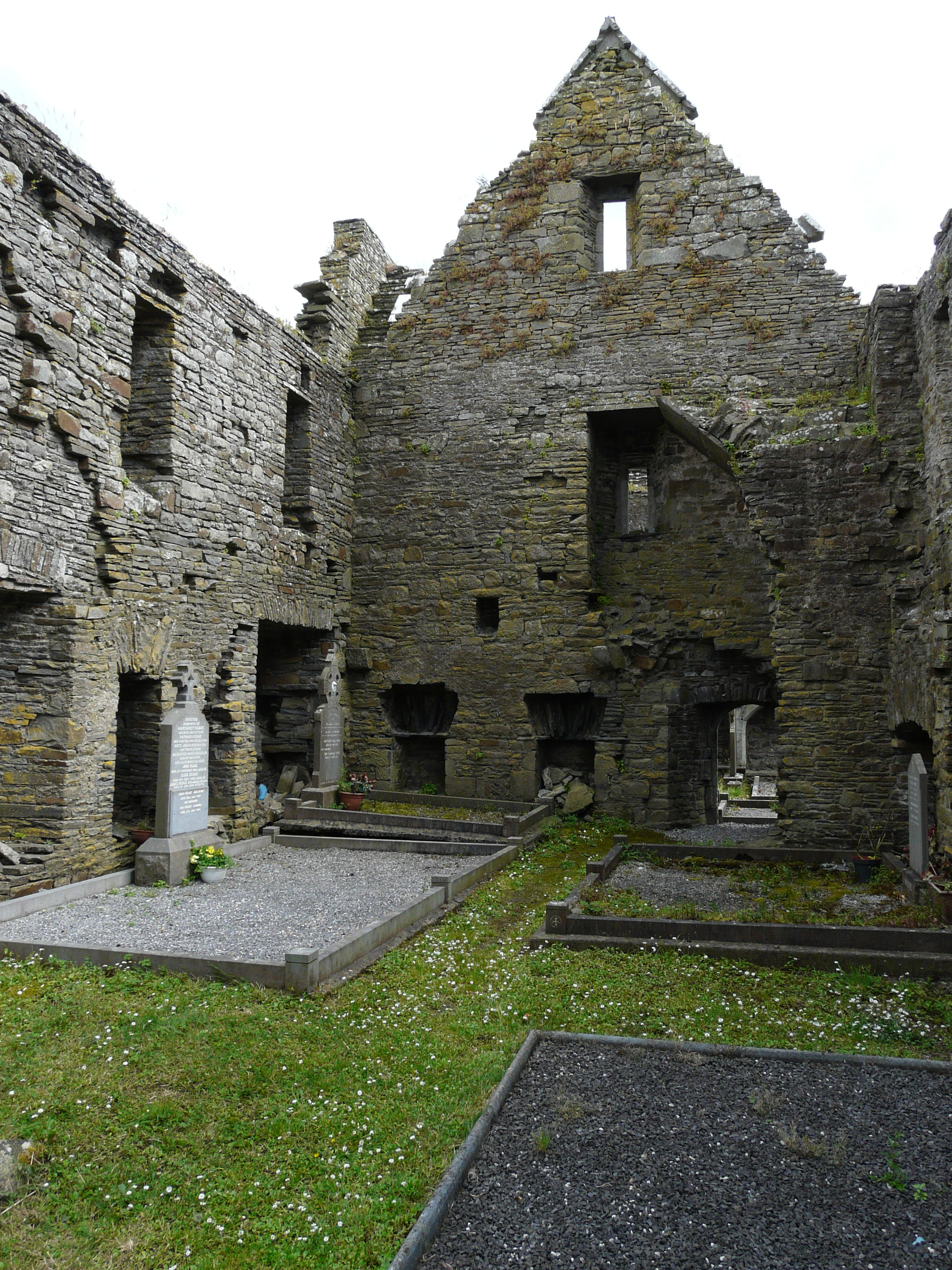
Interior of the ruins

The abbey church is a long house divided into choir and nave with triple sedilia; the collapsed square tower was over the choir arch.

The thirty windows are pointed and of cut limestone. A two-storey building contained refectory and dormitory. To the northeast is the garderobe.
