= R552 road (Ireland) =

Road in County Kerry, Ireland

Coordinates: 52.532147°N 9.485409°W

R552 road
- Bóthar R552

Route information
- Length: 12.0 km (7.5 mi)

Major junctions
- From: R551 Ballylongford
- Crosses River Deel and River Galey; R553 Listowel (John B. Keane Road)
- To: N69 Listowel (Lower William Street)

Location
- Country: Ireland

Highway system
- Roads in Ireland; Motorways; Primary; Secondary; Regional

The R552 road is a regional road in Ireland, located in County Kerry.
