= Jer D. O'Connor =

Irish Gaelic footballer

Personal information
- Native name: Gearóid Pádraig Ó Conchubhair (Irish)
- Born: 1940 (age 85–86) Lisselton, County Kerry, Ireland
- Occupation: Farmer
- Height: 5 ft 10 in (178 cm)

Sport
- Sport: Gaelic football
- Position: Half-back /Midfield
Club
- Years: Club
- 1950s-1970s: Ballydonoghue
Club titles
- Kerry titles: 1
- Munster titles: 1
Inter-county*
Years	County	Apps (scores)
1960-1967	Kerry	15 (0-4)
Inter-county titles
- Munster titles: 3
- All-Irelands: 0
- NFL: 1
- *Inter County team apps and scores correct as of 18:01, 25 September 2011.

Gerard Patrick "Jer D" O'Connor (born 1940) is an Irish former Gaelic footballer who played as a half-back and midfielder for the Kerry senior team.

O'Connor made his first appearance for the team during the 1960 championship and established himself as a regular member of the starting fifteen between 1964 and 1967. During that time an All-Ireland medal eluded him, however, he won three Munster winner's medals and one National League winner's medal.

At club level, O'Connor played with the Ballydonoghue club and the Shannon Rangers divisional team. In 1964, Shannon Rangers won both the Kerry and the inaugural Munster championship. He went on to captain Kerry in 1965, losing to Galway in the All-Ireland Senior Final, having reached two previous finals as a Kerry player, winning neither.

Sporting positions
Preceded by Niall Sheehy	Kerry Senior Football Captain; 1965	Succeeded by
