= R554 road (Ireland) =

Road in Ireland

Coordinates: 52.486929°N 9.602890°W

R554 road
- Bóthar R554

Route information
- Length: 3.4 km (2.1 mi)

Major junctions
- From: R551 Gortagurrane West
- To: R553 Lisselton

Location
- Country: Ireland

Highway system
- Roads in Ireland; Motorways; Primary; Secondary; Regional

The R554 road is a regional road in Ireland, located in County Kerry.
