= R552 road =

R552 road may refer to:

- R552 road (Ireland)
- R552 road (South Africa)
