= Richard Rahilly =

Irish judicial officer (1839–1896)

Richard Rahilly (1839–1896), was a grocer, entrepreneur, justice of the peace and nationalist public representative in Ballylongford, County Kerry, in the latter part of the 19th century.

At a nationalist meeting in 1877 in Ballylongford, he seconded a vote of confidence in the nationalist MP, Rowland Ponsonby Blennerhassett. He was appointed a Justice of the Peace in 1890 and was a member of the Board of Guardians of Listowel Poor Law Union.

As a grocer and entrepreneur he was innovative and was said to be the first person in Ireland with a domestic fridge, as well as to have had the first cash register in Munster. He was involved in setting up Listowel creamery co-operative, now part of Kerry Group,

He was father of the revolutionary leader The O'Rahilly and of the republican activists Nell Humphreys and Anno O'Rahilly.

He died as a result of pneumonia contracted after cycling home to Ballylongford in torrential rain from a meeting of Listowel Board of Guardians in March 1896.
