= Ballydonoghue GAA =

Gaelic football club in County Kerry, Ireland

Ballydonoghue
- Baile Uí Dhonnchú
- Founded: 1930s
- Colours: Green and white
- Grounds: Denis Dowling Park, Coolard
- Coordinates: 52°29′11″N 9°31′10″W

Playing kits
First kit	Second kit

Ballydonoghue GAA is a Gaelic Athletic Association club in north County Kerry, Ireland. It fields Gaelic football teams at underage and adult levels. All teams represent the parish of Ballydonoghue which contains the village of Lisselton. The club's home ground is Denis Dowling Park, Coolard. The club is affiliated to the North Kerry Football Board and is one of six clubs which form the Shannon Rangers divisional side which competes in the Kerry Senior Football Championship. The club was founded during the 1930s following the amalgamation of several smaller teams. Several Ballydonoghue players have played on the Kerry inter-county football team, including three club members who were on the Kerry team that contested the 1947 All-Ireland Senior Football Championship final at the Polo Grounds in New York.

As of 2024, the club competed in the North Kerry Senior Football Championship and also in Division 3 of the Kerry County Football League where they missed out on promotion to Division 2, losing the promotion play-off to Keel. The club were runners-up in Division 1A of the North Kerry Football League and also competed in the Kerry Intermediate Football Championship. Ballydonoghue B finished in first place in Division 4 of the Kerry County Developmental League for 2024 and also first in Division 3 of the North Kerry League.

At officiating level, the club are represented by referees Brendan Griffin (one of only two Kerry referees on the GAA's national panel of referees) and Eamonn Moran.

== History ==
In the early years of the 20th century, a number of the townlands around the village of Lisselton in County Kerry, had their own football teams. During the 1930s, these began to amalgamate so that by the end of the decade there was one Ballydonoghue team that represented the entire parish. During the 1940s and 1950s, the new club won a number of North Kerry titles. In 1944, they reached the final of the North Kerry Senior Football Championship for the first time but lost to An t-Arm (Fort Shannon) on a scoreline of 1–6 to 1–1. They returned to the final in 1945 and again in 1946, winning on both occasions, defeating Finuge (1–8 to 0–2pts) and Listowel Emmets (0–9 to 1–5) respectively. From 1949 to 1953, they would play in 5 finals in-a-row where they faced either Duagh or Ballylongford. They won in 1949 (2–5 to 3pts v. Duagh), 1950 (3–4 to 2–5 v Ballylongford) and again in 1952 (drew 2–1 to 7pts with Duagh, but awarded title without replay). By the end of the 1950s, they had won a sixth title, defeating Tarbert by 3–6 to 1–2 in 1959. Their appearance in the 1961 final (which they lost to Moyvane) was the last time they would reach the final of the North Kerry Championship for over 30 years.

During the 1960s and 1970s members of the Ballydonoghue club played as part of the divisional side, Shannon Rangers (and for a time Feale Rangers). Ballydonoghue had three representatives on the Shannon Rangers team that won the 1964 Kerry Senior Football Championship when they defeated East Kerry 1–10 to 1–5. They would go on to represent Kerry in the inaugural Munster Senior Club Football Championship which they won, defeating Cooraclare of Clare, 2–7 to 0–4pts. The club was also represented in the Shannon Rangers team which won the 1972 Kerry Senior Football Championship. They defeated Mid Kerry on a scoreline of 2–8 to 1–7. In 1977, Ballydonoghue left Shannon Rangers and joined the Feale Rangers divisional side. While they missed out in Shannon Rangers success in 1977, the club was represented by the Bunyan brothers in the Feale Rangers side which won the 1978 Kerry Senior Football Championship. Three years previously, the Bunyan brothers had represented Kerry on All-Ireland final day in Croke Park, when Robert Bunyan captained the Kerry minor team to victory over Tyrone while Johnny Bunyan won a medal with the senior team in their victory over Dublin. Also in 1978, Ballydonoghue won the Kerry Novice Football Championship defeating Milltown/Castlemaine in the final. The club also won Division 3 of the Kerry County Football League.

During the 1980s, the club and local community around Lisselton raised enough money to purchase a permanent home for the club at Coolard cross, building a pitch, dressing rooms and stand. It was officially opened in 1987.

In 1992, the club won the North Kerry Senior Football Championship after a gap of 33 years. In the final, they defeated the holders Listowel Emmets by 8 points to 3. They returned to the North Kerry final two years later, but lost by a single point to Ballyduff. Ballydonoghue also reached the final of the Kerry Novice Football Championship in 1994, but lost to Na Gaeil. They returned to the Novice final again in 2007, but lost again, this time to Cromane.

In 2015, Ballydonoghue became the first North Kerry team to win the Kerry County Minor League Division 1 and the players on that team went on to be part of the club's senior team in the following years. In 2016, they won the North Kerry Senior Football Championship when they defeated St. Senan's 5–9 to 0–8pts. They retained their title the following year beating Ballyduff 1–13 to 1–4. In 2018, they reached the final again for the third year in a row but were defeated by St. Senan's who won their first ever North Kerry Senior Football Championship title.

In 2021, the club won the 2020 Kerry Premier Junior Football Championship. The championship had been postponed due to the COVID-19 pandemic so it was September 2021 by the time the final was played. Ballydonoghue defeated Gneeveguilla at Austin Stack Park on a scoreline of 3–20 to 3–18 after extra-time. Because of the delay, Ballydonoghue were denied the opportunity to represent Kerry in the 2020 Munster Junior Club Football Championship which was cancelled. Just over two months later, the club were involved in another delayed 2020 final, this time for the North Kerry Senior Football Championship. On this occasion they lost out to Castleisland Desmonds.

Jason Foley, who had been a member of the minor team of 2015, won an All-Ireland medal in 2022 and became the first Ballydonoghue player to win an All Star. In 2023, the club won a tenth North Kerry Senior Football Championship title, defeating St. Senan's 2–6 to 1–6 in the first ever final played in Ballyduff. In January 2024, the club completed a North Kerry cup double for 2023 when Ballydonoghue B defeated Beale B 2–08 to 1–09 in the delayed final of the North Kerry Intermediate Football Championship.

== Honours ==
- Kerry Premier Junior Football Championship (1): 2020
- Kerry Novice Football Championship (1): 1978
- Kerry County Football League - Division 3 (1): 1978
- North Kerry Senior Football Championship (10): 1945, 1946, 1949, 1950, 1952, 1959, 1992, 2016, 2017, 2023
- North Kerry Intermediate Football Championship (1): 2023

== Notable players ==
- John Bunyan
- Gus Cremin
- Mick Finucane
- Tony Flavin
- Jason Foley
- Brendan Hennessy
- Jer D. O'Connor
- Liam O'Flaherty
- Colin O'Mahony
