= R553 road =

R553 road may refer to:

- R553 road (Ireland)
- R553 (South Africa)
