= Iraghticonnor =

Barony in County Kerry, Ireland

Iraghticonnor Oireacht Uí Chonchúir (Irish)
- Barony
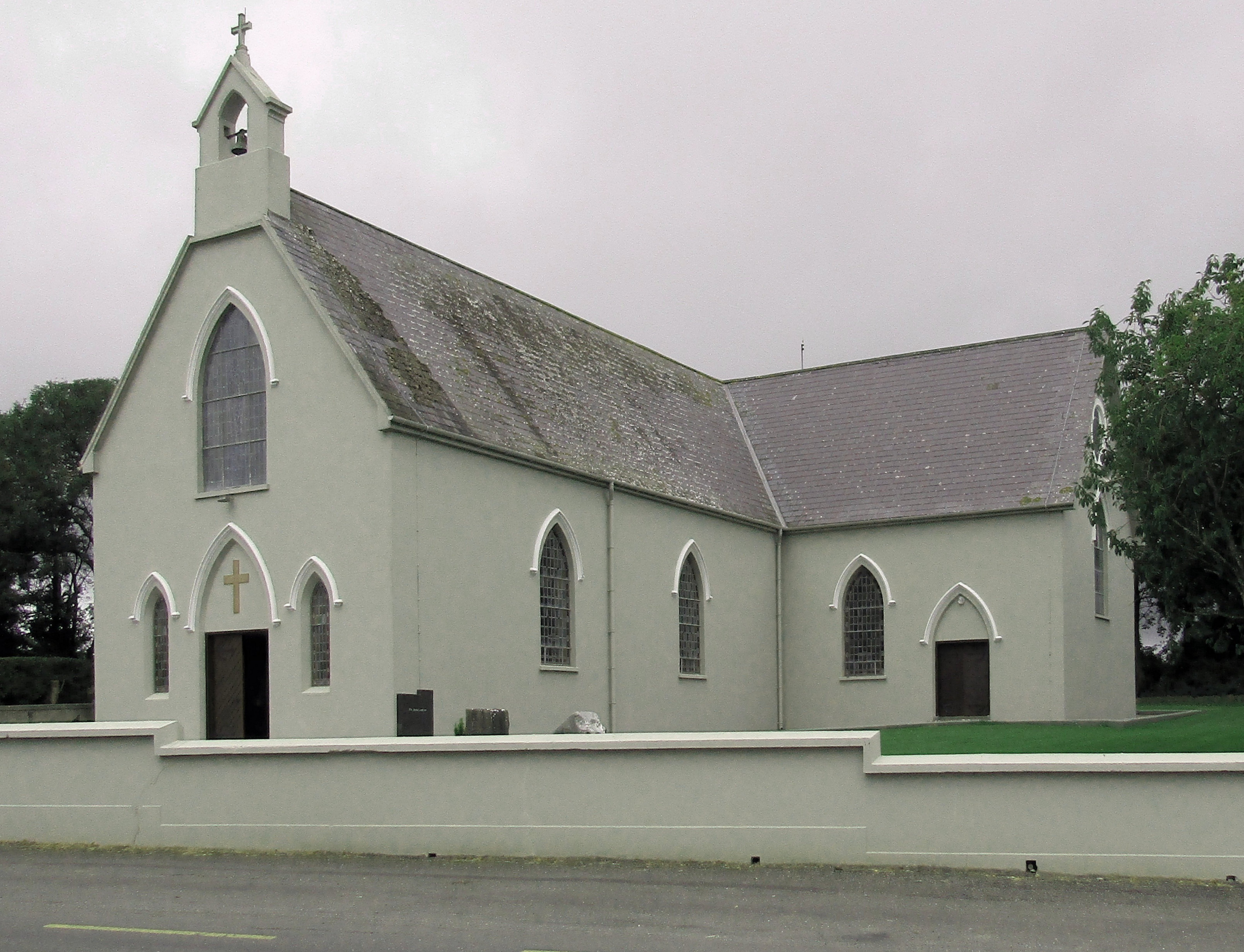
- Saint Teresa's Church in Lisselton

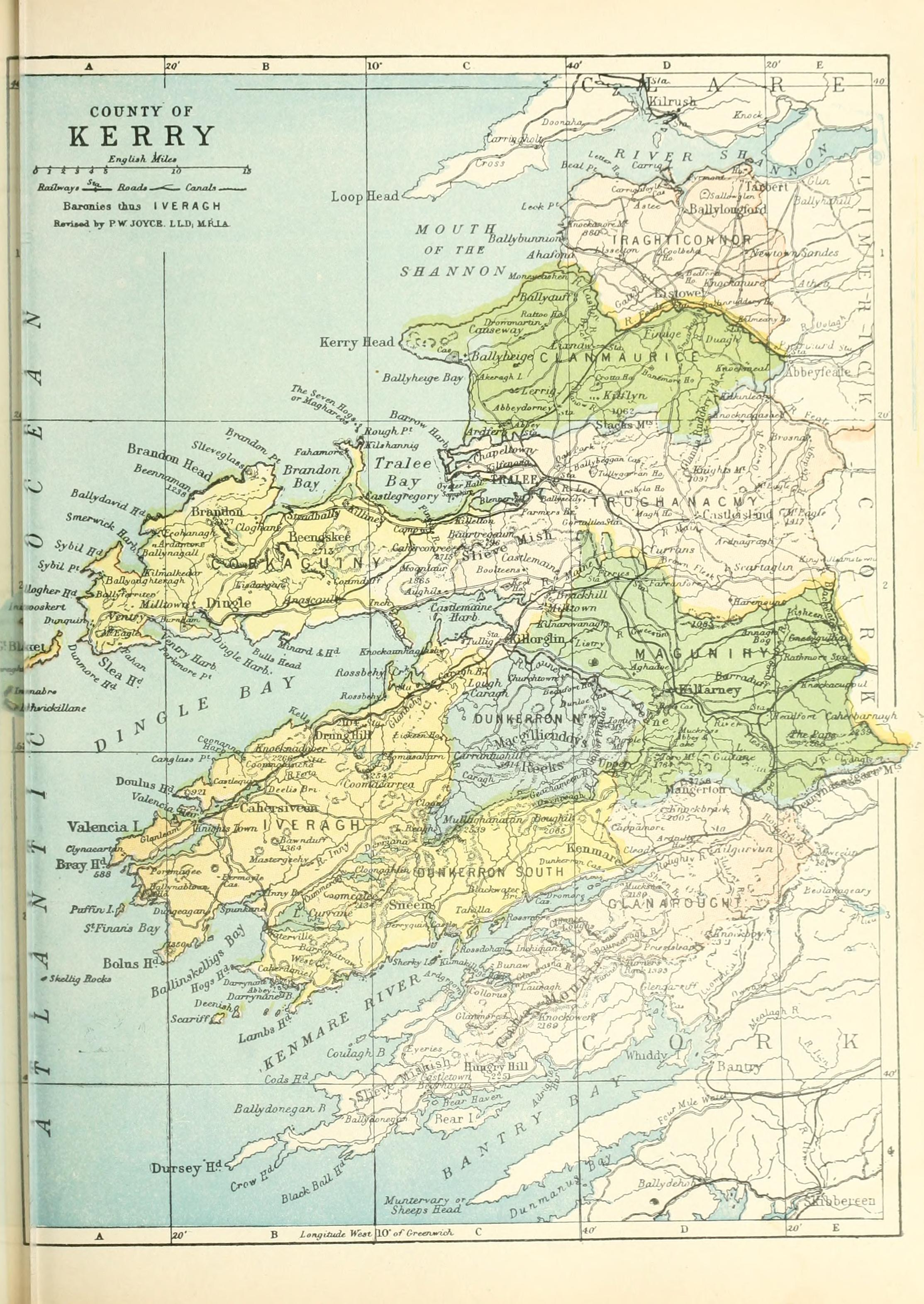
- Barony map of County Kerry, 1900; Iraghticonnor barony is in the north, coloured peach.

- Location within Ireland
- Coordinates: 52°29′N 9°29′W
- Sovereign state: Ireland
- Province: Munster
- County: Kerry

Area
  - Total: 356.5 km^{2} (137.6 sq mi)

Iraghticonnor (Irish: Oireacht Uí Chonchúir) is a historical barony in northeastern County Kerry, Ireland.

Baronies were mainly cadastral rather than administrative units. They acquired modest local taxation and spending functions in the 19th century before being superseded by the Local Government (Ireland) Act 1898.

== History ==
The name Iraghticonnor is from Irish Oireacht Uí Chonchúir, "inheritance of the Uí Chonchúir [O'Conors]". The territory was also named Hy Cain air Ciaruidhe.

== Geography ==
Iraghticonnor is in the northeast of the county, bounded to the north by the Shannon Estuary, to the east by the border with County Limerick, and to the south by the River Feale and Cashen River.

== List of settlements ==
Settlements within the historical barony of Iraghticonnor include:

- Ballybunnion
- Ballylongford
- Lisselton
- Listowel
- Newtownsandes
- Tarbert
