= John Bunyan (sportsperson) =

Irish hurler and Gaelic footballer

Personal information
- Born: Lisselton, County Kerry

Sport
- Football Position: Forward
- Hurling Position: Forward
Clubs
- Years: Club
- 1960's-1990: Ballydonoghue and Ballyduff
Club titles
	Football	Hurling
Kerry titles	1	8
Inter-county
Years	County	Apps (scores)
1960's-1970's	Kerry (H) Kerry (F)	0 3
Inter-county titles
	Football	Hurling
Munster Titles	1	
League titles	0	
All-Stars	0	

John Bunyan was a dual player from County Kerry. He played both football and hurling with Kerry during the 1970s. Originally from Ballydonoghue Johnny joined up with neighbouring Ballyduff who are more well known for hurling rather than football. Bunyan would go on to be a great player at both codes. In football, he won a Munster Under-21 Football Championship in 1968 and an All Ireland Senior medal in 1975. He played at full forward in the Munster Final having a notable battle with Humphrey Kelliher of Cork and also in the All Ireland semi-final against Sligo. He was omitted from the team for the final against Dublin. On the same day in 1975 his brother Robert captained the Kerry Minors to All Ireland victory over Tyrone. In hurling he also had success winning an All-Ireland Junior Hurling Championship medal in 1972 and an All-Ireland Senior B Hurling Championship in 1976.

At club level he also had much success with Ballyduff and Shannon Rangers. In all Bunyan played in 13 county finals between football and hurling (5 football and 8 hurling). He won 8 Kerry Senior Hurling Championships with Ballyduff in 1972, 1973, 1976, 1977, 1978, 1984, 1988 and 1989. He won 2 Kerry Senior Football Championship with Shannon Rangers in 1972 and with Feale Rangers in 1978.
