= Anno O'Rahilly =

Irish revolutionary

Anna "Anno" O'Rahilly (née Rahilly) (17 February 1873 – 1958) was an Irish revolutionary and Cumann na mBan member, republican prisoner and hunger-striker active in the period from 1916 to 1923. Born in Ballylongford, County Kerry to grocer and nationalist public representative Richard Rahilly and Ellen Mangan, she was a sister of the 1916 leader The O'Rahilly and the Cummann na mBan leader Nell Humphreys (née Rahilly). and became a member of the Gaelic League. Like The O'Rahilly, she changed her name from the original Rahilly. In April 1914 she was one of a small group of women present at the founding of Cumann na mBan in Wynne's Hotel, Dublin.

Following the death of her brother The O'Rahilly in combat in 1916 she was arrested and detained in the aftermath of the Easter rising and was released in late 1916. She provided the first money to be handled by Dail Eireann in 1919, a loan for £2000. The National Library of Ireland holds a letter from her appealing for money on behalf of republican prisoners' dependents. During the Irish Civil War she took the anti-treaty side, on 4 November 1922 she was accidentally shot in the family home in Ailesbury Road by Ernie O'Malley

After her recovery, she was detained for the rest of the civil war in Mountjoy Prison, Kilmainham Gaol and the North Dublin Union, where she was on hunger strike in October–November 1923.
