= R554 road =

R554 road may refer to:

- R554 road (Ireland)
- R554 road (South Africa)
