= Mick Finucane =

Irish Gaelic footballer

Personal information
- Native name: Mícheál Mac Fionmhacáin (Irish)
- Born: 1922 Lisselton, County Kerry, Ireland
- Died: 5 July 2016 (aged 93) Tralee, County Kerry, Ireland

Sport
- Sport: Gaelic football
- Position: Left wing-back
Clubs
- Years: Club
- Ballydonoghue; Shannon Rangers
Club titles
- Kerry titles: 1
Inter-county
Years	County	Apps (scores)
1946–1950	Kerry	5 (0–00)
Inter-county titles
- Munster titles: 1
- All-Irelands: 0
- NFL: 0

Michael Finucane (1922 – 5 July 2016) was an Irish Gaelic footballer who played as a left corner-back and left wing-back for the Kerry senior team.

Born in Lisselton, County Kerry, Finucane first played competitive Gaelic football in his youth. He came to prominence with his local club Ballydonoghue before later having Kerry Senior Championship success with the Shannon Rangers divisional team.

Finucane made his senior debut during the 1946-47 league. He went on to play a brief role for Kerry on the left-hand-side flank, and won one Munster Senior Football Championship medal. He was an All-Ireland runner-up on one occasion.

As a member of the Munster inter-provincial team on a number of occasions, Finucane won one Railway Cup medal. Throughout his inter-county career he made 5 championship appearances. Finucane retired from inter-county football following the conclusion of the 1950 championship.

== Honours ==
Shannon Rangers

- Kerry Senior Football Championship (1): 1945

Kerry

- Munster Senior Football Championship (1): 1947

Munster

- Railway Cup (1): 1949
