= Colin O'Mahony =

Irish Gaelic footballer

Personal information
- Born: 1987 (age 38–39) County Kerry, Ireland

Sport
- Sport: Gaelic football
- Position: Left Corner Back
Club
- Years: Club
- 2000s–: Ballydonoghue
Inter-county
- Years: County
- 2000's: Kerry
Inter-county titles
- Munster titles: 0
- All-Irelands: 0
- NFL: 0

Colin O'Mahony is a Gaelic footballer from County Kerry. He has been a key player in much underage success for the county. He was part of the Kerry minor panel that won the 2004 Munster Championship and later lost out to Tyrone in the All Ireland final. He then moved on to the Under 21 side where again he won a Munster Championship and later helped Kerry to a first Under 21 All Ireland title in 10 years when they beat Kildare in the final. After some impressive displays with the Under 21s he got a call up to the county junior team where he won his second Munster Championship of the year, he was back with the junior team once in 2010 when he won another Munster title and helped Kerry to a place in the All Ireland final where they were shocked by Sligo on the day.

He plays his club football with his local Ballydonoghue and the Shannon Rangers teams.
