= Nancy O'Rahilly =

American-born Irish republican (1878–1961)

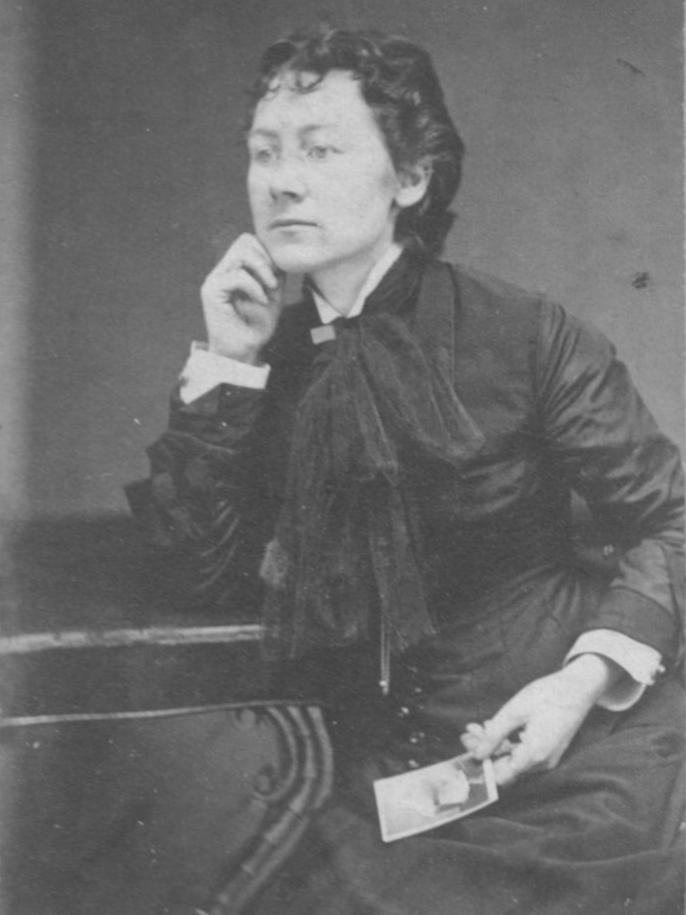
- O'Rahilly photographed after the Easter Rising. In her hand is believed to a photograph of her late husband
- Born: Nancy Brown; 1878; Manhattan, New York City
- Died: 1961 (aged 82–83); Herbert Park, Ballsbridge, Dublin
- Organizations: Gaelic League; Cumann na mBan
- Spouse: Michael O'Rahilly (m. 1899; died 1916)
- Children: 6

Nancy O'Rahilly (1878 –1961) was an American-born Irish nationalist who was involved in the founding and early activities of several institutions in Ireland in the early 20th century.

== Early life ==
Nancy Brown, known to her family and friends as Nannie, was born on 5th Avenue, Manhattan, New York City to a wealthy American industrialist family in 1878. Nancy would be better known by her married name O'Rahilly, and her part in the Irish revolutionary period. Her husband, The O'Rahilly, was one of the leaders and the most senior casualty of 1916 Easter Rising.

She was educated in the United States, before visiting Ireland, and later attended an Ursuline convent in Paris. She first met Michael Rahilly, when he was a medical student in Dublin. Known to him as Nannie, they were engaged, deciding thereafter to move to New York, her fiancé following to be near her. He sold his family business in County Kerry, before moving to America. They were married on 15 April 1899. Rahilly worked for her father's Brown Mills Company. Their first child came soon after on 14 March 1900, named Bobby. They lived in New York until 1902, before moving back to Ireland. Bobby died in June 1903 but another son, Richard (always known as 'Mac') was born on 3 July 1903. They lived in Paris, and then Brighton, before Egan (from the Irish 'Aodogan') was born in 1904. The family then moved to London. In 1905, they moved again back to New York, and closed the family business, Brown Mills, which had failed. Their fourth son, Niall was born in Philadelphia in December 1906. They lived in New York until 1909.

== Later life in Ireland ==
Together with her husband, Nancy O'Rahilly returned to Ireland to live near sisters Nell and Anna Humphreys. They joined the Gaelic League and became fluent in the Irish language (gaelic). O'Rahilly contributed to Irish Freedom, editor of An Claidheamh Soluis, the Gaelic League paper.

Nancy O'Rahilly joined Cumann na mBan in 1914 and was elected to its founding Executive Committee. Two oldest sons joined Fianna Éireann. Her husband Michael Joseph O'Rahilly, was killed during the Easter Rising, having written a note of dying declaration to her.

Her last child was born, after the Rising, in July 1916. Her house at 40 Herbert Park, Ballsbridge, County Dublin where she lived with her young family was raided by British soldiers in mid-1916. After the Rising she was named as a committee officer in an organization founded to assist the families of Irish Volunteers - the Irish National Aid and Volunteers Dependents Fund.

In 1920, she joined the White Cross organization, and she was appointed to the executive committee and spoke on a fundraising tour of the US. She became a Vice-President of Cumann na mBan, but resigned in 1922, during the Irish Civil War, when her son was fighting for the anti-treaty IRA, which she also supported. She also acted on the Winding-Up Committee in 1925.

She lived in Herbert Park, Ballsbridge until her death in 1961, and is buried in Glasnevin Cemetery.
