= 1990–91 National Football League (Ireland) =

Gaelic football competition

League details
- Dates: October 1990 – 5 May 1991

League champions
- Winners: Dublin (7th win)
- Captain: Tommy Carr
- Manager: Paddy Cullen

League runners-up
- Runners-up: Kildare
- Manager: Mick O'Dwyer

The 1990–91 National Football League, known for sponsorship reasons as the Royal Liver Assurance National Football League, was the 60th staging of the National Football League (NFL), an annual Gaelic football tournament for the Gaelic Athletic Association county teams of Ireland.

Dublin defeated Kildare in the final.

== Format ==
1990-91 was the final season of this league structure. The league was re-formatted for 1991-92.

=== Divisions ===
- Division One: 8 teams
- Division Two: 8 teams
- Division Three: 16 teams. Split into two regional groups of 8 (North and South)

=== Round-robin format ===
Each team played every other team in its division (or group where the division is split) once, either home or away.

=== Points awarded ===
2 points were awarded for a win and 1 for a draw.

=== Titles ===
Teams in all three divisions competed for the National Football League title.

=== Knockout stage qualifiers ===
- Division One: first 4 teams
- Division Two: first 2 teams
- Division Three (North): first team
- Division Three (South): first team

=== Knockout phase structure ===
In the quarter-finals, the match-ups were as follows

- Quarter-final 1: First-placed team in Division One v First-placed team in Division Three (South)
- Quarter-final 2: Second-placed team in Division One v First-placed team in Division Three (North)
- Quarter-final 3: Third-placed team in Division One v Second-placed team in Division Two
- Quarter-final 4: Fourth-placed team in Division One v First-placed team in Division Two

The semi-final match-ups are

- Semi-final 1: Winner Quarter-final 1 v Winner Quarter-final 4
- Semi-final 2: Winner Quarter-final 2 v Winner Quarter-final 3

The final match-up is: Winner Semi-final 1 v Winner Semi-final 2.

=== Promotion and relegation ===
Owing to the re-structure of the league, promotion and relegation did not take place in the same manner as it did under the same structure in other years.

- Division One: No relegation. All 8 teams placed in Division One of the 1991–92 NFL.
- Division Two: top 7 teams placed in Division One of the 1991–92 NFL. Bottom team placed in Division Two of the 1991–92 NFL.
- Division Three (North): group winners promoted to Division One of the 1991–92 NFL. Group runners up play-off for the third promotion slot from Division Three to Division One of the 1991–92 NFL. Remaining teams in the group placed in Division Two of the 1991–92 NFL.
- Division Three (South): group winners promoted to Division One of the 1991–92 NFL. Group runners up play-off for the third promotion slot from Division Three to Division One of the 1991–92 NFL. Remaining teams in the group placed in Division Two of the 1991–92 NFL.

=== Separation of teams on equal points ===
In the event that teams finish on equal points, then a play-off will be used to determine group placings if necessary, i.e. where to decide relegation places or quarter-finalists.

== League Phase Tables and Results ==
=== Division One ===
Team	Pld	W	D	L	Pts	Status
Dublin	7	5	1	1	11	Advance to quarter-finals; placed in Division One of the 1991–92 NFL
Donegal	7	4	1	2	10	Advance to quarter-finals; placed in Division One of the 1991–92 NFL
Kerry	7	4	0	3	8	Advance to quarter-finals; placed in Division One of the 1991–92 NFL
Roscommon	7	4	0	3	8	Advance to quarter-finals; placed in Division One of the 1991–92 NFL
Armagh	7	3	1	3	7	Placed in Division One of the 1991–92 NFL
Meath	7	2	2	3	6	Placed in Division One of the 1991–92 NFL
Down	7	1	2	4	4	Placed in Division One of the 1991–92 NFL
Cork	7	1	1	5	3	Placed in Division One of the 1991–92 NFL

=== Division Two ===
==== Division Two play-offs ====
31 March 1991 For 2nd Place	Kildare	3-11 — 2-8	Leitrim	Navan

==== Table ====
Team	Pld	W	D	L	Pts	Status
Tyrone	7	5	1	1	11	Advance to quarter-finals; placed in Division One of the 1991–92 NFL
Kildare	7	5	0	2	10	Advance to quarter-finals; placed in Division One of the 1991–92 NFL
Leitrim	7	5	0	2	10	Placed in Division One of the 1991–92 NFL
Derry	7	4	1	2	9	Placed in Division One of the 1991–92 NFL
Mayo	7	3	2	2	8	Placed in Division One of the 1991–92 NFL
Longford	7	1	1	5	3	Placed in Division One of the 1991–92 NFL
Antrim	7	1	1	5	3	Placed in Division One of the 1991–92 NFL
Cavan	7	1	0	6	2	Placed in Division Two of the 1991–92 NFL

=== Division Three ===
==== Division Three promotion play-off ====
31 March 1991	Galway	1-13 — 0-10	Wexford	Navan

==== Division Three (North) table ====
Team	Pld	W	D	L	Pts	Status
Offaly	7	7	0	0	14	Advance to quarter-finals; placed in Division One of the 1991–92 NFL
Galway	7	5	1	1	11	Placed in Division One of the 1991–92 NFL
Louth	7	4	0	3	8	Placed in Division Two of the 1991–92 NFL
Laois	7	3	0	4	6	Placed in Division Two of the 1991–92 NFL
Fermanagh	7	3	0	4	6	Placed in Division Two of the 1991–92 NFL
Monaghan	7	3	0	4	6	Placed in Division Two of the 1991–92 NFL
Westmeath	7	1	1	5	3	Placed in Division Two of the 1991–92 NFL
Sligo	7	1	0	6	2	Placed in Division Two of the 1991–92 NFL

==== Division Three (South) table ====
Team	Pld	W	D	L	Pts	Status
Wicklow	7	6	1	0	13	Advance to quarter-finals; placed in Division One of the 1991–92 NFL
Wexford	7	5	0	2	10	Placed in Division Two of the 1991–92 NFL
Tipperary	7	4	0	3	8	Placed in Division Two of the 1991–92 NFL
Limerick	7	4	0	3	8	Placed in Division Two of the 1991–92 NFL
Carlow	7	3	0	4	6	Placed in Division Two of the 1991–92 NFL
Waterford	7	3	0	4	6	Placed in Division Two of the 1991–92 NFL
Clare	7	2	1	4	5	Placed in Division Two of the 1991–92 NFL
Kilkenny	7	0	0	7	0	Placed in Division Two of the 1991–92 NFL

== Knockout stages ==
=== Quarter-finals ===
14 April 1991

Dublin	2-10 – 0-11	Wicklow

Croke Park, Dublin

14 April 1991

Donegal	1-16 – 0-16	Offaly

Breffni Park, Cavan
Attendance: 5,000

14 April 1991

Kildare	1-7 – 0-9	Kerry

Croke Park, Dublin

14 April 1991

Roscommon	1-9 – 0-11	Tyrone

Breffni Park, Cavan
Attendance: 5,000

=== Semi-finals ===
21 April 1991

Dublin	1-18 – 0-11	Roscommon

Croke Park, Dublin

21 April 1991

Kildare	0-14 – 1-10	Donegal

Croke Park, Dublin

=== Final ===
5 May 1991
Final

Dublin	1-9 – 0-10	Kildare

Croke Park, Dublin
Attendance: 50,000
Referee: Damian Campbell Tempo Maguires County Fermanagh
