= Brendan Hennessy =

Personal information
- Native name: Breandán Ó hAonghusa (Irish)
- Born: Ballyduff, County Kerry, Ireland

Sport
- Football Position: Midfield
- Hurling Position: Midfield
Club
- Years: Club
- Ballyduff
Club titles
	Football	Hurling
Kerry titles	0	2
Inter-county
- Years: County
- 1958-1974: New York, Kerry (H); New York (F)
Inter-county titles
	Football	Hurling
Munster Titles	0	0
All-Ireland Titles	0	0
League titles	1	1
All-Stars	0	0

Brendan Hennessy was a dual player from Ballyduff, County Kerry, Ireland. He played both football and hurling with New York and hurling & minor football with Kerry as well as his local Ballyduff club in hurling and Ballydonoghue in football.

Hennessy spent most of his playing days in New York where he played in a number of National Hurling League finals in the 1950s until the 70's. He also played in a number of National Football League finals, winning one in 1964 when New York beat Dublin in the final. While in New York Hennessy played hurling with the Kilkenny club, he never won a New York Senior Hurling Championship but played in back to back finals in 1962 and 63. He played football with the Kerry club and won New York Senior Football Championship medals in 1959, 1960, 1962–63, 1966–67. He also played with his brother Michael in New York. He is regarded as one of the best players to have ever played in New York.

Before going to New York, Hennessy also played with Kerry and won a Munster Junior Hurling Championship title in 1956 with them.

He played with the famous Ballyduff club. Prior to 1955, the club had only won one Kerry Senior Hurling Championship in 1891, but in 1955, with his brother Michael as captain, Ballyduff won the championship for the first time since 1891. In 1957 Brendan himself captained Ballyduff to a championship win.

He went to school in the famous St. Flannan's College in Ennis where he was regarded as one of the best players to have played with the college along with the likes of Anthony Daly, Len Gaynor, Jamsie O'Connor and Tony Reddin to name just a few. He won Dr Harty Cup & Dr Croke Cup medals with the school during his time there.

In 2003 he won the Munster Council Hall of Fame Award for hurling.
