= Tony Flavin =

Irish Gaelic footballer

Personal information
- Born: 1940 (age 85–86) County Kerry, Ireland

Sport
- Sport: Gaelic football
- Position: Midfield
Club
- Years: Club
- Ballydonoghue The Kingdom
Club titles
- London titles: 6
Inter-county
- Years: County
- 1960's-1970's: Kerry London
Inter-county titles
- Munster titles: 0
- All-Irelands: 0
- NFL: 0

Tony Flavin was a Gaelic footballer who played with Kerry and London during the 1960s and 1970s.

He captained the London team that beat Leitrim in the Connacht Championship in 1977, which until 2011 was London's only championship win. In 1971 he won his All Ireland Junior medal when London beat Dublin 1-09 to 0-09. He played minor and under 21 with Kerry and help his team to under 21 and Junior Munster titles.

He won six London Championships with The Kingdom between 1973 and 1978, plus five senior league titles and five All Britain Club Championships. Tony also won two All Ireland 7-a-Sides in 1975 -76.
