= Jack Walsh (Gaelic footballer) =

Irish Gaelic footballer

Personal information
- Born: Asdee, County Kerry, Ireland

Sport
- Sport: Gaelic football
- Position: Full Back
Club
- Years: Club
- 1920s-1980s: Asdee
Club titles
- Kerry titles: 2
Inter-county
Years	County	Apps (scores)
1928–1943	Kerry	21
Inter-county titles
- Munster titles: 5
- All-Irelands: 6
- NFL: 4

Jack Walsh (born 1903) was a Gaelic footballer from Asdee, County Kerry. A left full back, he played with Kerry from 1924 to 1934. He won 5 Munster Senior Championships, 6 All-Ireland Senior Championships and 4 National Leagues during his career.

== Life and career ==
Walsh was educated at Asdee National School, then St. Michael's College in Listowel.

After a trial game, he was picked for Kerry in 1924, playing in the All-Ireland final against Dublin, which Kerry won by one point. His second All-Ireland victory was in 1926, when Kerry beat Kildare in the final after a replay. During this match Walsh switched to left full back to replace an ill team-mate, a position he then held until his retirement from inter-county football in 1934.

Walsh was a member of the Kerry team for each of their "four in a row" All-Ireland titles in 1929, 1930, 1931 and 1932. He was also in the team that was beaten in the semi-final in 1933 by Cavan, in Walsh's last match for the county. Walsh was also a member of Railway Cup-winning sides in 1927 and 1931.

Walsh toured the United States with Kerry on three occasions, in 1927, 1931, and 1933.

At club level he played with Asdee and Shannon Rangers, with whom he won County Championship medals in 1942 and 1945.

In 2015, Asdee GAA opened a new pitch named Walsh Park in honour of Jack Walsh.
