= Asdee =

Village in County Kerry, Ireland

Asdee Eas Daoi
- Village
- Location in Ireland
- Coordinates: 52.552°N 9.560°W
- Country: Ireland
- Province: Munster
- County: Kerry
- Time zone: UTC+0 (WET)
  - Summer (DST): UTC-1 (IST (WEST))

Asdee or Astee (Irish: Eas Daoi, meaning 'black waterfall') is a small village in County Kerry, Ireland. The village is home to a primary school, Catholic church and a Gaelic Athletic Association (GAA) club.

== History ==
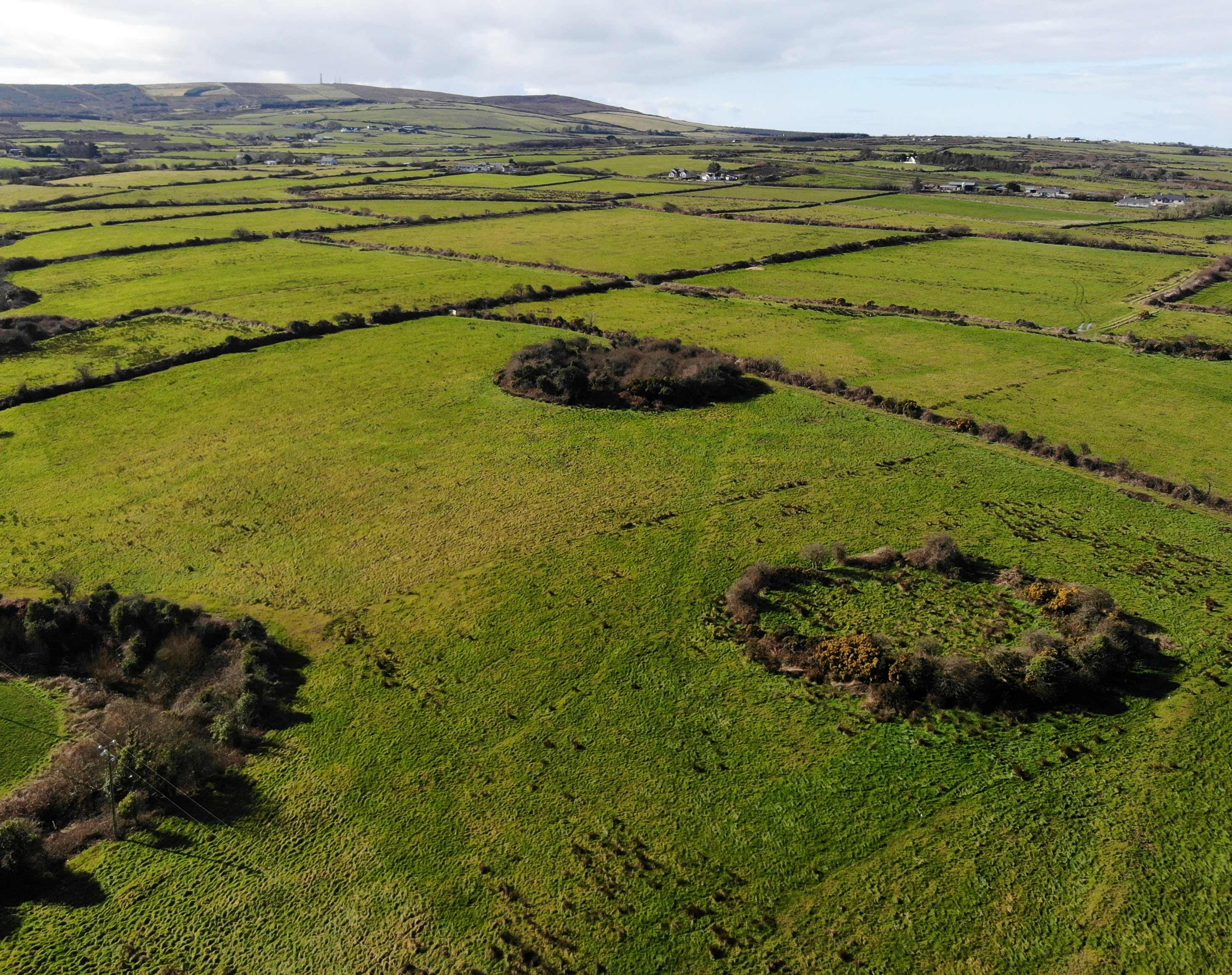
Ringforts on the outskirts of Asdee Village

Evidence of ancient settlement in the area includes a number of ringfort sites, to the west of the village in the townland of Astee West, which were built between 600AD and 900AD.

At the turn of the 12th century, the O'Connors, Kings of Kerry, moved from their stronghold at Doon Point (Ballybunion) to Clár an Easa Duibhe (meaning "plain of the black waterfall"), where the village is now situated. This move was undertaken to facilitate an alliance between the O'Connors and the O'Brien dynasty, then Kings of Thomond. The waters around Clár an Easa Duibhe allowed the O'Connors passage to the O'Brien stronghold of what is now County Clare.

By 1146, the O'Connor's had built a castle in the area and the area became known as Caisleán Easa Duibhe, or "castle of the black waterfall". Three kingships ruled from Caisleán Easa Duibhe, before the O'Connors moved to Carrigafoyle Castle (near Ballylongford) at the end of the 12th century. The castle in Caisleán Easa Duibhe subsequently fell into disrepair, and some of the stone from the castle was ultimately used in the building of three houses beside the church in the village.

The black waterfall, from where the village gets its name, was quarried prior to the mid-18th century, leaving a smaller version of the original waterfall remaining a short distance upstream of the village.

=== Jesse James ===
The village has an association with Jesse James, whose ancestor, John James, lived in Asdee, having moved from the United Kingdom, before migrating to the United States in the mid-17th century. Jesse James was born in Kearney, Missouri in 1847, going on to become one of the most well-known outlaws in the American Wild West.

== Amenities ==
A local Green Flag beach, Littor Strand, stretches along the estuary into the adjoining Beale Beach. The nearby estuary is home to bottlenose dolphins, migrant waders and Brent geese. The beach is also home to oystercatchers, curlews, dunlins, several types of seagull and other bird species.

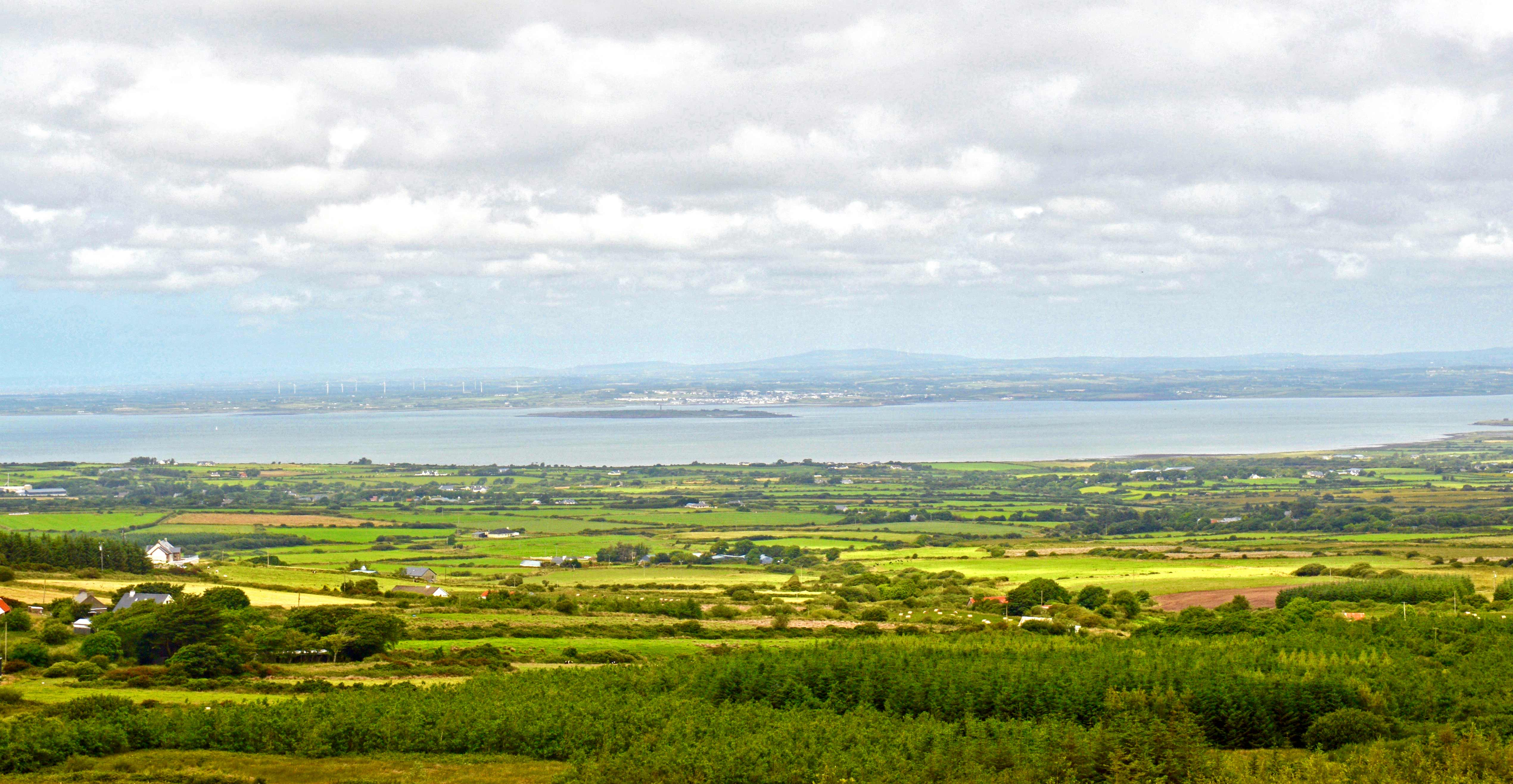
View from the Shannon Way Trail

The nearby Shannon Way Walking Trail overlooks the Shannon Estuary. Stretching from Cnoc an Óir to Tarbert, the trail gives views of North Kerry, Clare and Limerick.

Asdee's national (primary) school, Scoil Easa Dhuibhe, had an enrollment of 57 pupils in 2025.

== Built heritage ==
=== Tullahinell House ===
Tullahinell House, known locally as "The Buildings", was the former landlord's residence of Maxwell V. Blacker-Douglas. During the Great Famine of the mid-19th century, Douglas provided employment on his farm for some people in the area.

There was a mill here in the late-1800s, the stream for which no longer exists, having originally been artificially diverted.

During the Irish War of Independence (1919–1921), "The Buildings" was sometimes used as a refuge for members of the Irish Republican Army. During this period, it also hosted a meeting of senior Republican figures, including Cathal Brugha and Arthur Griffith.

=== Church ===
The church in the village, the Church of St. Mary, was built in 1835 and extended and renovated in 1964. Its original construction was largely funded by the Hickie family. Originally from County Clare, ancestors of the Hickies had been hereditary physicians to the Kings of Munster, before their lands were confiscated in the 1650s following the Cromwellian conquest of Ireland. After moving to the area, the family built Kilelton House, between Asdee and Ballylongford.

The church is in the Catholic parish of Ballylongford/Asdee, within the Diocese of Kerry. The church was the location of a reported 'moving statue' phenomenon in February 1985.

=== St Eoin's well ===
St Eoin's Well, located near the village, hosts an annual mass every June. This holy well was traditionally believed to have healing properties.

== Sport ==
The local Gaelic Athletic Association (GAA) club, Asdee GAA, has its origins in the early 20th century. Reformed in 1986, it has historically contested competitions in the North Kerry division, including the North Kerry League and North Kerry Championship. In 2008, the club won the North Kerry Intermediate Championship title. The club is based at Jack Walsh Park in Asdee. The ground is named after Jack Walsh, a local footballer who won several All-Ireland Senior Football Championship titles with the Kerry senior team. Other All-Ireland winners from Asdee include John Kennedy (who won three three All-Ireland medals in the 1980s), and brothers Paudie O'Donoghue and Éamonn O'Donoghue (both with two All-Ireland winners medals).

== Demographics ==
As of the 2011 census, the townland of Astee East had a population of 62 people, while the census returns for Astee West recorded the same number of people. The electoral division of Astee (which spans 39 km^{2} (15 sq mi) and contains Astee East, Astee West and a number of other townlands) had a population of 496 as of the 2022 census.

== See also ==
- List of towns and villages in the Republic of Ireland
