= The O'Rahilly =

Irish republican (1875–1916)

Michael O'Rahilly
- Mícheál Ó Rathaille
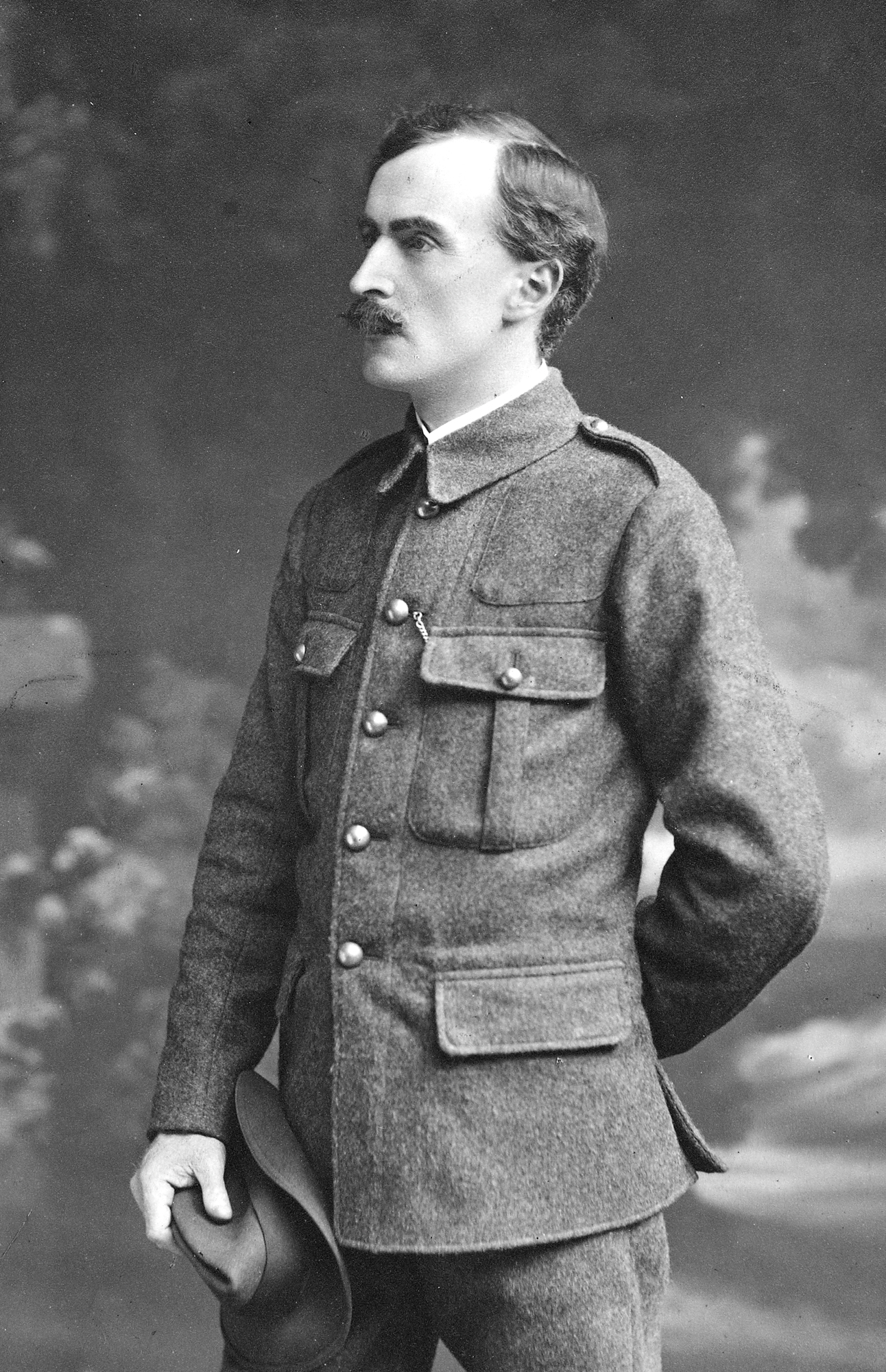
- The O'Rahilly, c. 1913–1916
- Born: Michael Joseph Rahilly; 22 April 1875; Ballylongford, County Kerry, Ireland
- Died: 29 April 1916 (aged 41); Dublin, Ireland
- Resting place: Glasnevin Cemetery
- Other names: The O'Rahilly, Ua Rathghaille
- Education: Clongowes Wood College
- Organizations: Irish Volunteers; Gaelic League
- Spouse: Nancy Brown (m. 1899)
- Children: 6
- Father: Richard Rahilly
- Relatives: Ronan O'Rahilly (grandson)
- Military career
- Allegiance: Irish Volunteers
- Service years: 1913–1916
- Rank: Director of Arms
- Conflicts: Easter Rising

Michael Joseph O'Rahilly (Irish: Mícheál Seosamh Ó Rathaille or Ua Rathghaille; 22 April 1875 – 29 April 1916), known as The O'Rahilly, was an Irish republican and nationalist. He was a founding member of the Irish Volunteers in 1913 and served as Director of Arms. Despite opposing the action, he took part in the Easter Rising in Dublin and was killed in a charge on a British machine gun post covering the retreat from the Dublin GPO during the fighting.

== Early life ==
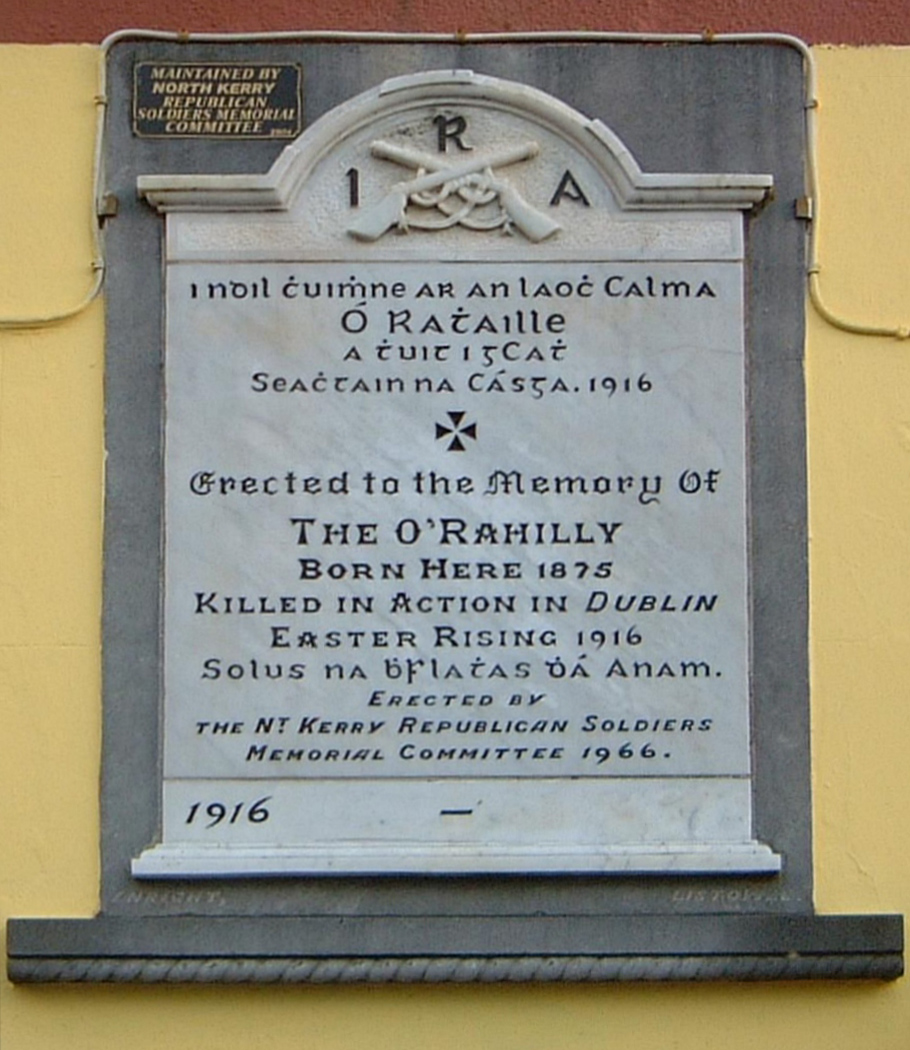
Plaque in Ballylongford, County Kerry

Michael Joseph Rahilly was born in Ballylongford, County Kerry, to Richard Rahilly, a grocer, and Ellen Rahilly (née Mangan). He was educated at Clongowes Wood College (1890–1893). He had two siblings who lived to adulthood, Nell Humphreys and Anno O'Rahilly, both of whom were active in the Irish revolutionary period. As an adult, he became a republican and a language enthusiast. He joined the Gaelic League and became a member of An Coiste Gnotha, its governing body. Prior to settling in Dublin he spent a decade travelling in the United States and Europe.

He married Nancy Brown on 15 April 1899 in New York and the couple had six sons together.

O'Rahilly was a founding member of the Irish Volunteers in 1913, who organized to work for Irish independence, and initially to defend the proposed Home Rule; he served as the Irish Volunteers' Director of Arms. He personally directed the first major arming of the Volunteers, the landing of 900 Mausers at the Howth gun-running on 26 July 1914.

O'Rahilly was a wealthy man; the Weekly Irish Times reported after the Easter Rising that he "enjoyed a private income of £900" per annum, plenty of which went to "the cause he espoused".

== Irish Volunteers ==
O'Rahilly was not party to the plans for the Easter Rising, nor was he a member of the Irish Republican Brotherhood (IRB), but he was one of the main people who trained the Irish Volunteers for the coming fight. The planners of the Rising went to great lengths to prevent those leaders of the Volunteers who were opposed to unprovoked, unilateral action from learning that a rising was imminent, including its Chief-of-Staff Eoin MacNeill, Bulmer Hobson, and O'Rahilly. When Hobson discovered that an insurrection was planned, he was kidnapped by the Military Council leadership.

Learning this, O'Rahilly went to Patrick Pearse's school, Scoil Éanna, on Good Friday. He barged into Pearse's study, brandishing his revolver as he announced "Whoever kidnaps me will have to be a quicker shot!" Pearse calmed O'Rahilly, assuring him that Hobson was unharmed, and would be released after the Rising began. O'Rahilly took instructions from MacNeill and spent the night driving throughout the country, informing Volunteer leaders in Cork, Kerry, Tipperary, and Limerick that they were not to mobilise their forces for planned manoeuvres on Sunday.

== Easter Rising ==
Arriving home, he learned that the Rising was about to begin in Dublin on the next day, Easter Monday, 24 April 1916. Despite his efforts to prevent such action (which he felt could only lead to defeat), he set out to Liberty Hall to join Pearse, James Connolly, Thomas MacDonagh, Tom Clarke, Joseph Plunkett, Countess Markievicz, Seán Mac Diarmada, Éamonn Ceannt and their Irish Volunteers and Irish Citizen Army troops. Arriving in his De Dion-Bouton motorcar, he gave one of the most quoted lines of the rising – "Well, I've helped to wind up the clock -- I might as well hear it strike!" Another famous, if less quoted line, was his comment to Markievicz, "It is madness, but it is glorious madness." His car was used to fetch supplies during the siege, and later as part of a barricade on Prince's Street, where it was burned out.

He fought with the GPO garrison during Easter Week. One of the first British prisoners taken in the GPO was Second Lieutenant AD Chalmers, who was bound with telephone wire and lodged in a telephone box by the young Volunteer Captain and IRB activist Michael Collins. Chalmers later recalled O'Rahilly's kindness to him. In a statement to a newspaper reporter, he said that he was taken from the phone box after three hours and brought up to O'Rahilly, who ordered: "I want this officer to watch the safe to see that nothing is touched. You will see that no harm comes to him".

On Friday 28 April, with the GPO on fire, O'Rahilly volunteered to lead a party of men along a route to Williams and Woods, a factory on Great Britain Street (now Parnell Street). A British machine-gun at the intersection of Great Britain and Moore streets cut him and several of the others down. O'Rahilly slumped into a doorway on Moore Street, wounded and bleeding badly but, hearing the British marking his position, made a dash across the road to find shelter in Sackville Lane (now O'Rahilly Parade). He was wounded diagonally from shoulder to hip by sustained fire from the machine-gunner. He bled to death slowly in a doorway in Moore Lane (latterly O'Rahilly Place) overnight alone. He managed to scribble off a farewell note to his wife and that night was heard crying for water.

According to ambulance driver Albert Mitchell (in a witness statement more than 30 years later), O'Rahilly still clung to life 19 hours after being severely wounded, long after the surrender had taken place on Saturday afternoon. The following is an extract:

While driving through Moore Street to Jervis Street Hospital one afternoon towards the end of the week the sergeant drew my attention to the body of a man lying in the gutter in Moore Lane. He was dressed in a green uniform. I took the sergeant and two men with a stretcher and approached the body which appeared to be still alive. We were about to lift it up when a young English officer stepped out of a doorway and refused to allow us to touch it. I told him of my instructions from H.Q. but all to no avail.

When back in the lorry I asked the sergeant what was the idea? His answer was – ‘he must be someone of importance and the bastards are leaving him there to die of his wounds. It's the easiest way to get rid of him.’

We came back again about 9 o'clock that night. The body was still there and an officer guarding it, but this time I fancied I knew the officer – he was not the one I met before. I asked why I was not allowed to take the body and who was it? He replied that his life and job depended on it being left there. He would not say who it was. I never saw the body again but I was told by different people that it was The O’Rahilly.

Desmond Ryan's The Rising maintains that it "was 2.30pm when Miss O'Farrell reached Moore Street, and as she passed Sackville Lane again, she saw O'Rahilly's corpse lying a few yards up the laneway, his feet against a stone stairway in front of a house, his head towards the street".

== Memorial ==
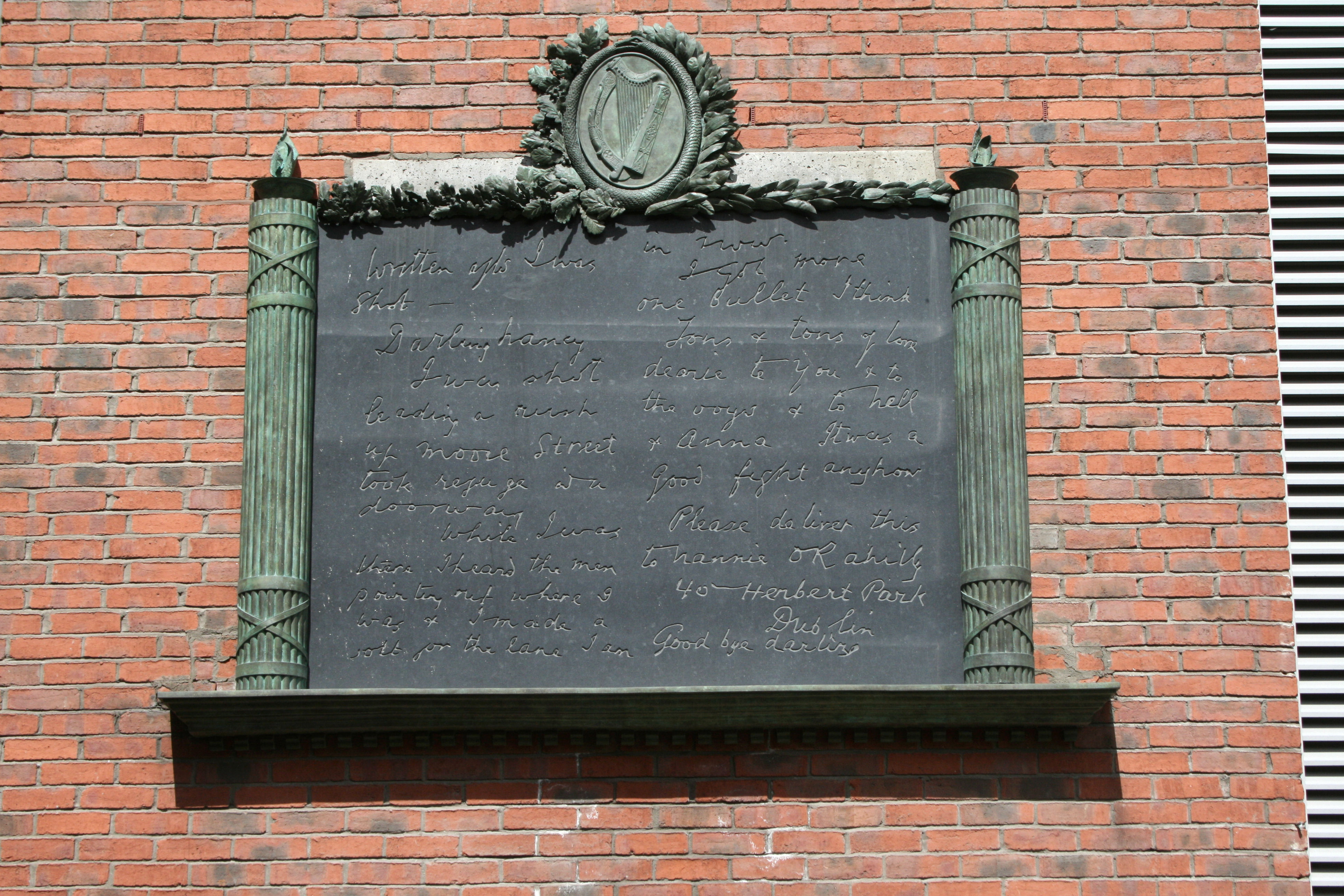
The memorial in O'Rahilly Parade, Dublin

O'Rahilly wrote a message to his wife on the back of a letter he had received in the GPO from his son. Shane Cullen etched this last message to Nannie O'Rahilly into his limestone and bronze memorial sculpture to The O'Rahilly. The text reads:

‘Written after I was shot. Darling Nancy I was shot leading a rush up Moore Street and took refuge in a doorway. While I was there I heard the men pointing out where I was and made a bolt for the laneway I am in now. I got more [than] one bullet I think. Tons and tons of love dearie to you and the boys and to Nell and Anna. It was a good fight anyhow. Please deliver this to Nannie O' Rahilly, 40 Herbert Park, Dublin. Goodbye Darling.’

== The O'Rahilly House ==
40 Herbert Park, before demolition

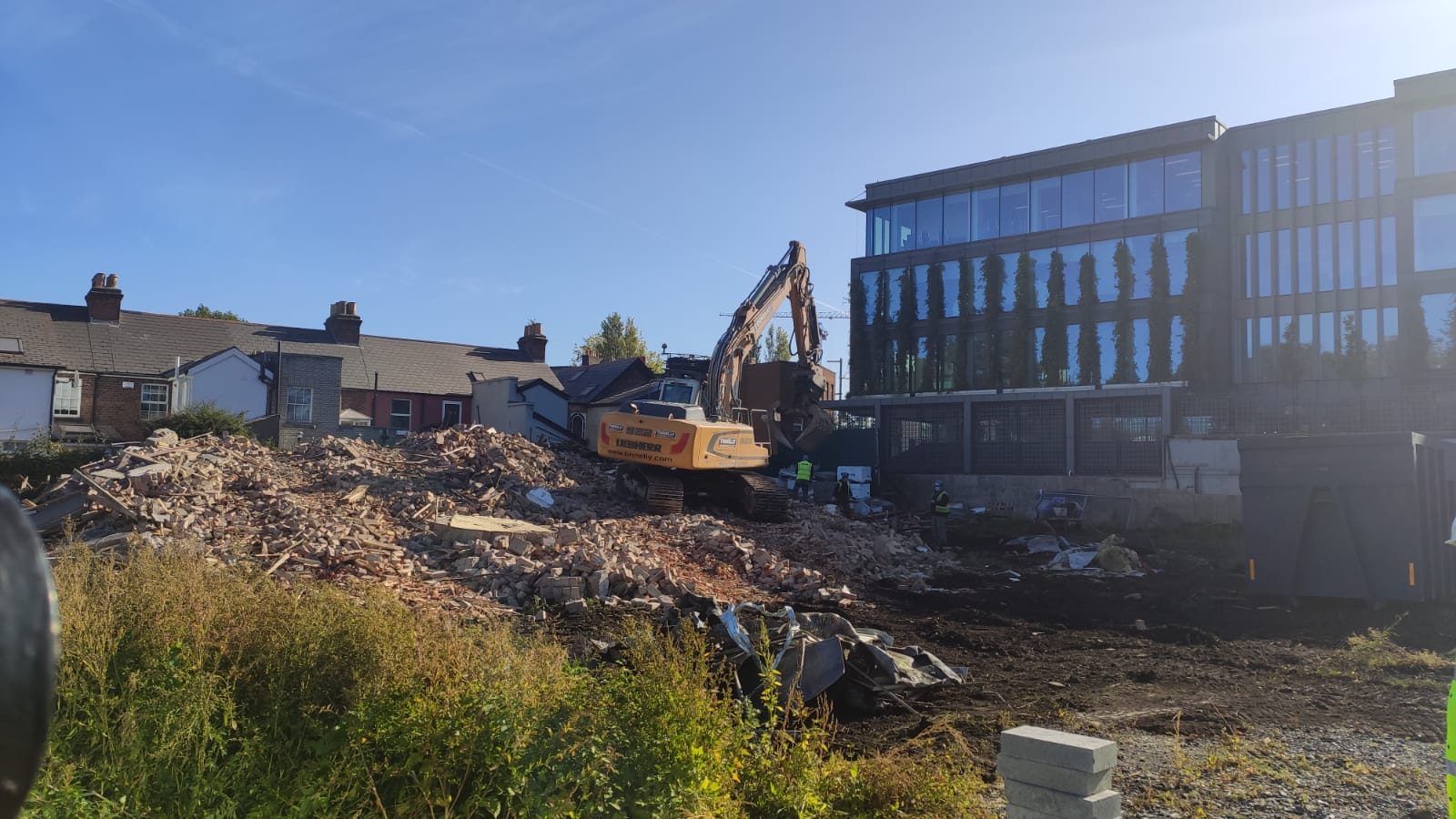
40 Herbert Park, after demolition

O'Rahilly's home between 1910 and 1916, at 40 Herbert Park, was contentiously demolished in September 2020. Permission for the Edwardian era building's demolition was given by An Bord Pleanála, despite calls from various political parties for its preservation on grounds of its connection to The O'Rahilly. The Department of Culture, Heritage and the Gaeltacht had also earlier voiced its support for the retention of the three adjoining properties for architectural reasons. The council's own conservation section had been assessing the building for listing on the Record of Protected Structures, having earlier passed over the building for protection on a number of occasions.

== Source of name ==
In Gaelic tradition, chiefs of a clan were called by their clan name preceded by the definite article, for example Robert the Bruce. O'Rahilly's calling himself "The O'Rahilly" was purely his own idea. In 1938, the poet W. B. Yeats defended O'Rahilly on this point in his poem "The O'Rahilly", which begins:

Sing of the O'Rahilly,

Do not deny his right;
Sing a 'the' before his name;
Allow that he, despite
All those learned historians,
Established it for good;
He wrote out that word himself,
He christened himself with blood.

How goes the weather?
