= Patrick Curtin =

Irish Gaelic footballer (1989–2015)

Personal information
- Native name: Padraig Mac Curtain (Irish)
- Born: 17 March 1989 Moyvane, County Kerry, Ireland
- Died: 29 December 2015 (aged 26) Miami, Florida, U.S.

Sport
- Sport: Gaelic football
- Position: Right corner-forward
Club
- Years: Club
- Moyvane
Inter-county*
Years	County	Apps (scores)
2012-2013	Kerry	6 (0-1)
Inter-county titles
- Munster titles: 0
- All-Irelands: 0
- NFL: 0
- All Stars: 0
- *Inter County team apps and scores correct as of 21:32, 29 December 2015.

Patrick Curtin (17 March 1989 – 29 December 2015) was an Irish Gaelic footballer who played as a left corner-forward for the Kerry senior football team.

== Career ==
Born in Moyvane, County Kerry, Curtin first played competitive Gaelic football in his youth. At club level he played with Moyvane. Curtin arrived on the inter-county scene when he first linked up with the Kerry minor team before later joining the under-21 and junior sides. He made his senior debut during the 2012 league. He would go on to play for Kerry for two seasons. He made a total of six championship appearances for Kerry. These included substitute appearances in two All-Ireland quarter-finals: in the 2012 loss to eventual champions Donegal, as well as the 2013 defeat of Cavan. His retirement came during the conclusion of the 2013 championship.

== Death ==
Just before Christmas in 2015, Curtin sustained serious head injuries after being involved in a car crash in Guatemala. After being transported to a Miami, Florida hospital, he died on 29 December 2015.
