= R553 road (Ireland) =

Regional road in Ireland

R553 road
- Bóthar R553

Route information
- Length: 14.1 km (8.8 mi)

Major junctions
- From: N69 at Church Street, Listowel, County Kerry
- R554 at Lisselton
- To: R551 at Gortnaskeha

Location
- Country: Ireland

Highway system
- Roads in Ireland; Motorways; Primary; Secondary; Regional
← R552	→ R554

The R553 road is a regional road in County Kerry, Ireland. It travels from the N69 road in Listowel to the R551 road near Ballybunion, via Lisselton. The road is 14.1 kilometres (8.8 mi) long.
