= Moyvane =

Village in County Kerry, Ireland

Moyvane Maigh Mheáin (Irish) Newtownsandes
- Village
- Location in Ireland
- Coordinates: 52°30′05″N 9°22′13″W
- Country: Ireland
- Province: Munster
- County: County Kerry
- Elevation: 63 m (207 ft)
- Irish Grid Reference: R069397

Moyvane (Irish: Maigh Mheáin, meaning 'main or middle plain'), also sometimes known as Newtownsandes, is a small village in County Kerry in the south west of Ireland. It is situated off the N69 road between Listowel to the southwest and Tarbert to the north. The village of Knockanure lies to the immediate south. The parish in which the village is located is now also known as the "Parish of Moyvane". It was originally called the parish of Murhur, which was part of the historic barony of Iraghticonnor.

== History ==
The name of "Moyvane", which in Irish is "Maigh Mheáin" meaning "the middle plain", was adopted by the village in 1939 when a plebiscite was held by Father O'Sullivan, who was the parish priest at the time. It is the name of a townland situated about two miles southwest of the actual village itself and this area resembles a flat plain landscape that extends for miles around.

Prior to 1939, the village had been called "Newtownsandes" and is even still referred to, by natives, as "Newtown" – which is especially true of the older generation. The village is still officially (on some maps and the register of electors, "but nowhere else") known as "Newtownsandes".

The name "Newtownsandes" comes from the village located on the lands of George Sandes when he was alive in the early 1880s. He was a notorious landlord (and agent of another) at that time and still tenaciously held on to his estates towards the end of the Land War when most of his peers had already given up theirs.

Around 1886, after a forceful eviction of some of his tenants, the name of the village was changed to "Newtowndillon" after John Dillon. However, this didn't stick, and the name remained unchanged until 1916 when another name-change was attempted: this time to "Newtownclarke" after the 1916 Easter Rising leader Thomas Clarke.

== Culture ==
=== Performance ===
Performances of music, drama, and storytelling are sometimes held in the Marian Hall. Past performances there have included the 'seanchaí' Eddie Lenihan, as well as recitals by other poets. A number of talent and comedy sketch shows have been held in the hall over the years. In 2004, Gabriel Fitzmaurice presented a radio show on Radio Kerry called 'The Boghole Boys'. The show, which aired each Monday night, sometimes included stories, music and poems performed by people from Moyvane and Knockanure.

=== Poetry ===
"The Village Hall" is a verse by Gabriel Fitzmaurice which tells the tale of the old shows that took place in the performance hall prior to the new one being established. "Willie's Car" is a poetic description of a popular village character written by Dan Keane.

== Sport ==
=== Gaelic games ===
The local Gaelic Athletic Association club, Moyvane GAA, won the North Kerry Senior Football Championship 18 times between 1925 and 2003. Moyvane also served as the setting for the 2005 championship final between Listowel Emmets and Ballyduff.

=== Soccer ===
Moyvane has a soccer club called Newtown Athletic. This club plays home games in Division 1 of the Kerry District League at a pitch in the centre of Moyvane.

=== Badminton ===
Badminton was first introduced to Moyvane in 1975. The first club was a juvenile club formed by Fr. Brosnan. It was played in the old Marian Hall. In 1976, Moyvane were among the prize winners in the County Championships held in Tarbert.

=== Basketball ===
Several basketball players, who have had victories at the county level and some international levels, have come from the village of Moyvane. Girls' school teams have represented the parish in All-Ireland competitions and have brought a number of All-Ireland medals to Moyvane.

== Nature trail ==
There is a nature walk in the area, the Moyvane Nature Trail, which was created to connect the woods where the Moyvane and Knockanure woods meet. It is situated about 11 km (7 mi) north east of Listowel and 8 km (5 mi) south of Tarbert. Originally proposed in early 1996 by the Moyvane Development Association, the project was part-funded by the North Kerry Walks Committee. With the help of 145 voluntary hours, the walk was open to the public in June 1996. The walk was later extended to include a route around the perimeter of the GAA pitch 1.5 km (0.9 mi), and to take in a river walk that passes a restored Limekiln.

== People ==
Notable people from/residents of Moyvane include:

- Fr Pat Ahern, founder of Siamsa Tíre
- Edmond Carmody, Bishop of San Antonio
- Patrick Curtin, Gaelic footballer
- Eoin Hand, footballer
- Tommy Stack, jockey and trainer
- Seán Walsh, footballer

== See also ==
- List of towns and villages in Ireland
- Market Houses in Ireland
