= Éamonn O'Donoghue (Gaelic footballer) =

Irish Gaelic footballer

Personal information
- Native name: Éamonn Ó Donnchú (Irish)
- Born: 1946 Asdee, County Kerry
- Died: 1983 (aged 36–37) Asdee, County Kerry
- Height: 5 ft 9 in (175 cm)

Sport
- Sport: Gaelic football
- Position: Left wing-forward
Club
- Years: Club
- 1960s-1980s: Shannon Rangers
Club titles
- Kerry titles: 3
- Munster titles: 1
Inter-county
| Years | County | Apps (scores) |
| 1967-1974 | Kerry | 24 (1-16) |
Inter-county titles
- Munster titles: 4
- All-Irelands: 2
- NFL: 5
- All Stars: 0

Éamonn O'Donoghue (born 1946 in Asdee, County Kerry) was an Irish former sportsperson. He played Gaelic football with his local club Ballylongford, divisional side Shannon Rangers and was a member of the Kerry senior inter-county team in the 1960s and 1970s. In 1983, shortly after his death, Castleisland Desmonds and Ballylongford jointly presented a Cup in his honour to the North Kerry Football Board to be presented to the winners of the North Kerry Senior Football Championship each year.
