= R551 road (Ireland) =

Road in Ireland

R551 road
- Bóthar R551
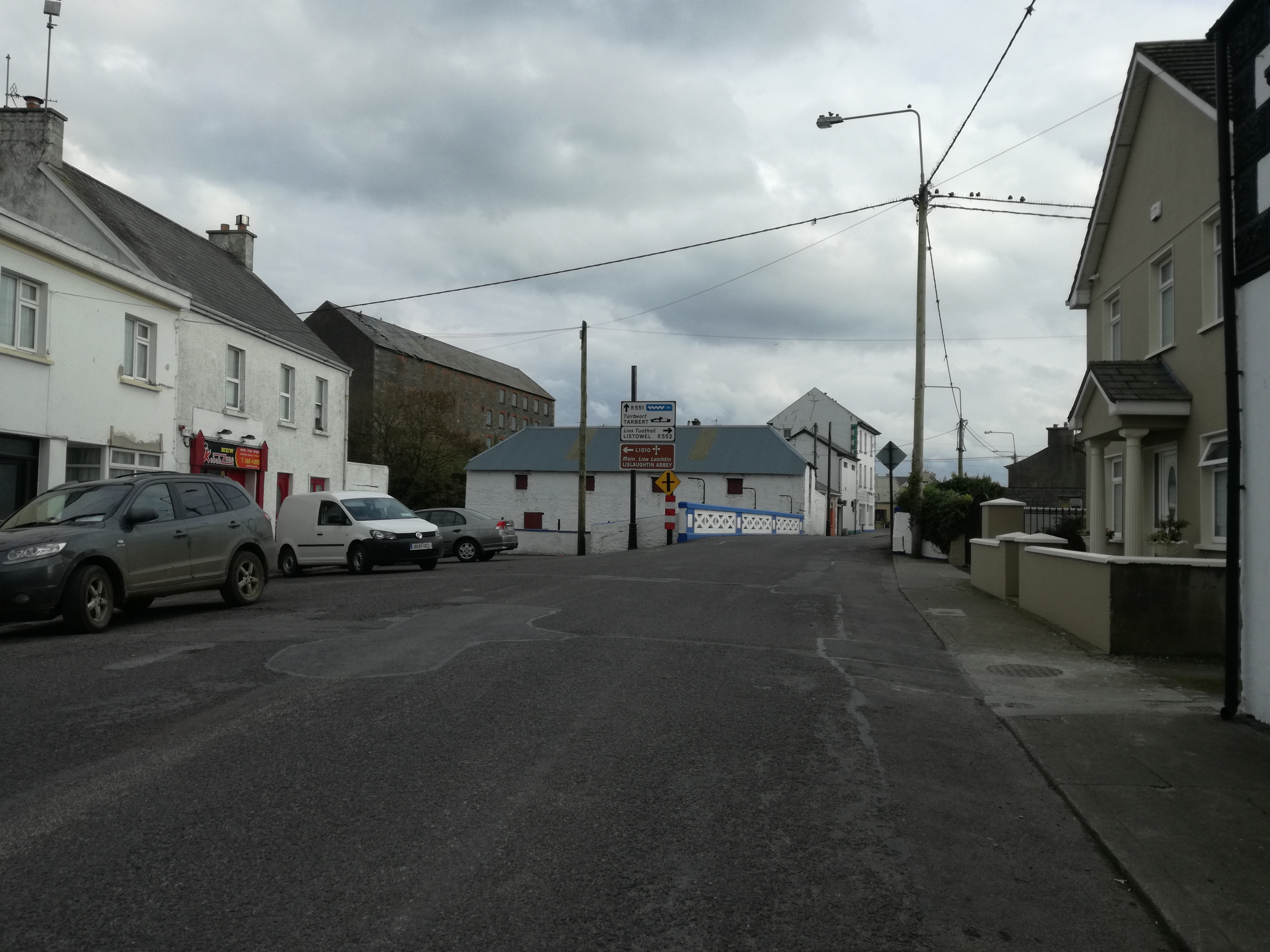
- Ballylongford on the R551

Location
- Country: Ireland

Highway system
- Roads in Ireland; Motorways; Primary; Secondary; Regional

The R551 road is a regional road in Ireland, linking Tarbert and Tralee in County Kerry.

== Route ==
It starts in Tarbert and runs via Ballylongford, Astee, Derra, Doon, Ballybunion, Gortnaskeha, Gortagurrane West, Ferry Bridge, Ballyduff, Glanerdalliv Bridge, Causeway, Dirtane, Ballyheigue and Ardfert to Tralee.

== See also ==
- Roads in Ireland
- National primary road
- National secondary road
