= Fort Shannon (Ireland) =

Coordinates: 52.5837°N 9.4348°W

Fort Shannon was a coastal artillery installation located at Ardmore Point, northwest of Tarbert, County Kerry, Ireland. The installation had two 6-inch guns, pillboxes and searchlight emplacements. Abandoned in 1946, a small number of concrete structures remain on the site.

== Location ==
Fort Shannon was constructed at Ardmore Point, west of Tarbert, County Kerry, overlooking the Shannon estuary. The installation is largely inaccessible by road. While described as a "fort", it is not a fortification in the strict military sense, and is rather a coastal artillery installation with a small bunker.

== History ==
In December of 1941, during The Emergency in Ireland, the Irish government, concerned at a possible invasion by either Britain or Nazi Germany, commissioned the installation of two 6-Inch guns to protect the Shannon Estuary. Following consideration and discussion of a possible location for the guns, a site at Ardmore Point was chosen due to its strategic location.

The installation was built along the coast, at the bottom of a steep slope. Much of the installation was invisible from the water and unless extensive reconnaissance was used, any approaching ships would be unaware of the guns until they were abreast of nearby Scattery Island.

The dispatch of the guns was authorised by Winston Churchill in December of 1941, though work did not begin until August of 1942, and was largely constructed by the 7th and 8th engineer companies.

The installation was manned by a unit of the Irish Army's coastal defence artillery under the Southern Command. The unit fielded a Gaelic football team that competed in the North Kerry Senior Football Championship.

Fort Shannon was evacuated on 31 May 1946 and the guns were seemingly removed sometime afterwards. As of 2023, the Fort Shannon site (comprising 0.81 acres (0.33 ha)) remained in the ownership of the Department of Defence.
