= Jason Foley (Gaelic footballer) =

Irish footballer

Jason Foley is an Irish Gaelic footballer who plays for the Ballydonoghue club and at senior level for the Kerry county team. He plays fullback for the Kerry team and his club Ballydonoghue.

== Kerry ==
In 2018 Foley made his Championship debut for Kerry against Clare.

In both 2022 and 2025 Foley won the All-Ireland Final with Kerry, starting both games at full back.

Following Kerry's 2026 All-Ireland Final loss to Mayo, Foley was selected at 3 in The Sunday Game 2026 Team of the Year.

== Honours ==
Ballydonoghue

- Kerry Premier Junior Football Championship: (1): 2020

Kerry

- All-Ireland Senior Football Championship (1): 2022

Individual

- All Star (1): 2022
