= Moyvane GAA =

Gaelic sports club in County Kerry, Ireland

- Maigh Mheáin
- County: Kerry
- Colours: Green and Gold
- Grounds: Moyvane
- Coordinates: 52°29′58.56″N 9°22′30.42″W

Playing kits
Standard colours

Moyvane GAA is a Gaelic Athletics Association club from Moyvane in north County Kerry, Ireland. They play in Division 5 of the County League, Kerry Novice Football Championship and North Kerry Senior Football Championship. They also participate in the Kerry Senior Football Championship through the divisional side Feale Rangers.

== Honours ==
- Kerry Novice Football Championship (1): 2006, 2021
- North Kerry Senior Football Championship (18): 1925,1927, 1928, 1929,1930, 1932, 1936, 1937, 1938, 1939, 1958, 1961, 1963, 1964, 1983, 1995, 1999, 2003

== Notable players ==
- Con Brosnan Six time All-Ireland Senior Football Championship winner. 1931 All-Ireland Senior Football Championship winning captain.
- Jim Brosnan Two time All-Ireland Senior Football Championship winner. Two time All-Ireland Minor Football Championship winner trainer. Former Kerry Senior Football team trainer.
- Patrick Curtin
- Bernie O'Callaghan
