= 1991–92 National Football League (Ireland) =

Gaelic football competition

League details
- Dates: October 1991 – 3 May 1992

League champions
- Winners: Derry (2nd win)
- Captain: Henry Downey
- Manager: Eamonn Coleman

League runners-up
- Runners-up: Tyrone

The 1991–92 National Football League, known for sponsorship reasons as the Royal Liver Assurance National Football League, was the 61st staging of the National Football League (NFL), an annual Gaelic football tournament for the Gaelic Athletic Association county teams of Ireland.

Derry defeated Tyrone in the final.

== Format ==
1991-92 saw a change in format, with a change in the number of divisions from three to two. The format proved unpopular and lasted for just one year. One of the main reasons that it became unpopular was that it guaranteed teams five games, whereas the previous format guaranteed seven.

=== Divisions ===
- Division One: 18 teams. Split into three groups of 6 teams each.
- Division Two: 14 teams. Split into two groups of 7 teams each.

=== Round-robin format ===
Each team played every other team in its division (or group where the division is split) once, either home or away.

=== Points awarded ===
2 points were awarded for a win and 1 for a draw.

=== Titles ===
Teams in both divisions competed for the National Football League title.

=== Knockout stage qualifiers ===
- Division One (A): top 2 teams
- Division One (B): top 2 teams
- Division One (C): top 2 teams
- Division Two (A): top team
- Division Two (B): top team

=== Promotion and relegation ===
There was no promotion or relegation, as the GAA decided to move to a "mixed ability" system on a one-off basis for 1992-93. This was to facilitate the re-structuring of the league into four divisions.

== Group stage ==
=== Division One ===
==== Group A play-off ====
22 March 1992 For 2nd Place	Dublin	2-8 — 0-8	Galway	Croke Park, Dublin

==== Group C play-offs ====
22 March 1992 For 3rd Place	Meath	1-11 — 0-9	Kildare	Croke Park, Dublin

29 March 1992 For 2nd Place	Meath	0-13 — 2-6	Kerry	Croke Park, Dublin

==== Group A Table ====
Team	Pld	W	D	L	Pts	Status
Tyrone	5	4	0	1	8	Advance to quarter-finals
Dublin	5	3	0	2	6	Advance to quarter-finals
Galway	5	3	0	2	6
Cork	5	2	1	2	5
Armagh	5	1	1	3	3
Mayo	5	1	0	4	2

==== Group B Table ====
Team	Pld	W	D	L	Pts	Status
Donegal	5	4	0	1	8	Advance to quarter-finals
Roscommon	5	4	0	1	8	Advance to quarter-finals
Wicklow	5	3	0	2	6
Longford	5	1	1	3	3
Antrim	5	1	1	3	3
Leitrim	5	1	0	4	2

==== Group C Table ====
Team	Pld	W	D	L	Pts	Status
Derry	5	5	0	0	10	Advance to quarter-finals
Meath	5	2	1	2	5	Advance to quarter-finals
Kerry	5	2	1	2	5
Kildare	5	2	1	2	5
Down	5	0	4	1	4
Offaly	5	0	1	4	1

=== Division Two ===
==== Group B play-off ====
22 March 1992 For 1st Place	Cavan	0-10 — 0-7	Monaghan	Navan

==== Group A Table ====
Team	Pld	W	D	L	Pts	Status
Clare	6	5	0	1	10	Advance to quarter-finals
Tipperary	6	5	0	1	10
Wexford	6	3	2	1	8
Limerick	6	3	0	3	6
Waterford	6	2	0	4	4
Carlow	6	1	1	4	3
Kilkenny	6	0	0	6	0

==== Group B Table ====
Team	Pld	W	D	L	Pts	Status
Cavan	6	5	0	1	10	Advance to quarter final
Monaghan	6	5	0	1	10
Fermanagh	6	3	1	2	7
Laois	6	3	0	3	6
Sligo	6	2	1	3	5
Louth	6	1	0	5	2
Westmeath	6	1	0	5	2

== Knockout stages ==
=== Finals ===
3 May 1992
Final

Derry	1-10 – 1-8	Tyrone

Croke Park, Dublin
