= Ballylongford =

Village in County Kerry, Ireland

Ballylongford Béal Átha Longfoirt
- Village
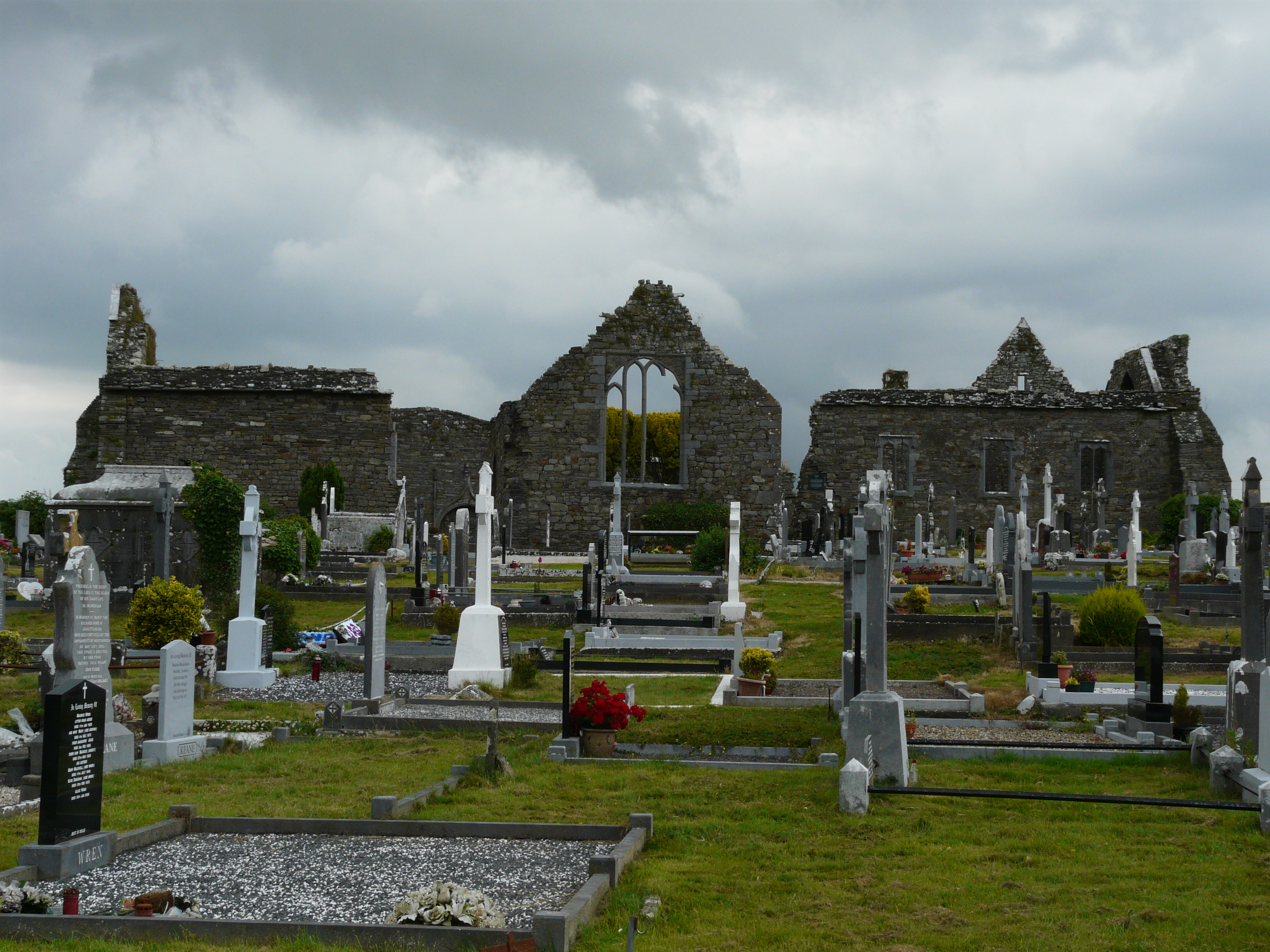
- Lislaughtin Abbey ruins and modern cemetery

- Location in Ireland
- Coordinates: 52.546°N 9.478°W
- Country: Ireland
- Province: Munster
- County: County Kerry
- Elevation: 4 m (13 ft)

Population (2022)
  - Total: 415
- Irish Grid Reference: Q996449

Ballylongford (historically Bealalongford, from Irish: Béal Átha Longfoirt, meaning 'ford-mouth of anchorage') is a village near Listowel in northern County Kerry, Ireland. As of the 2022 census, it had a population of 415.

== Geography ==
The village is situated near the estuary of the Ballyline River, on Ballylongford Bay, a tidal estuary of the River Shannon, close to Carrigafoyle Island and on the coast road between Tarbert and the seaside town of Ballybunion.

The farmland in the area is used primarily for dairying, a mainstay of the local economy.

Three kilometers to the north, on Carrigafoyle Island, stands the castle and anchorage commemorated in the village's name. For centuries, Ballylongford shared the castle's political, military and religious fate and the nearby Franciscan Lislaughtin Abbey.

== History ==
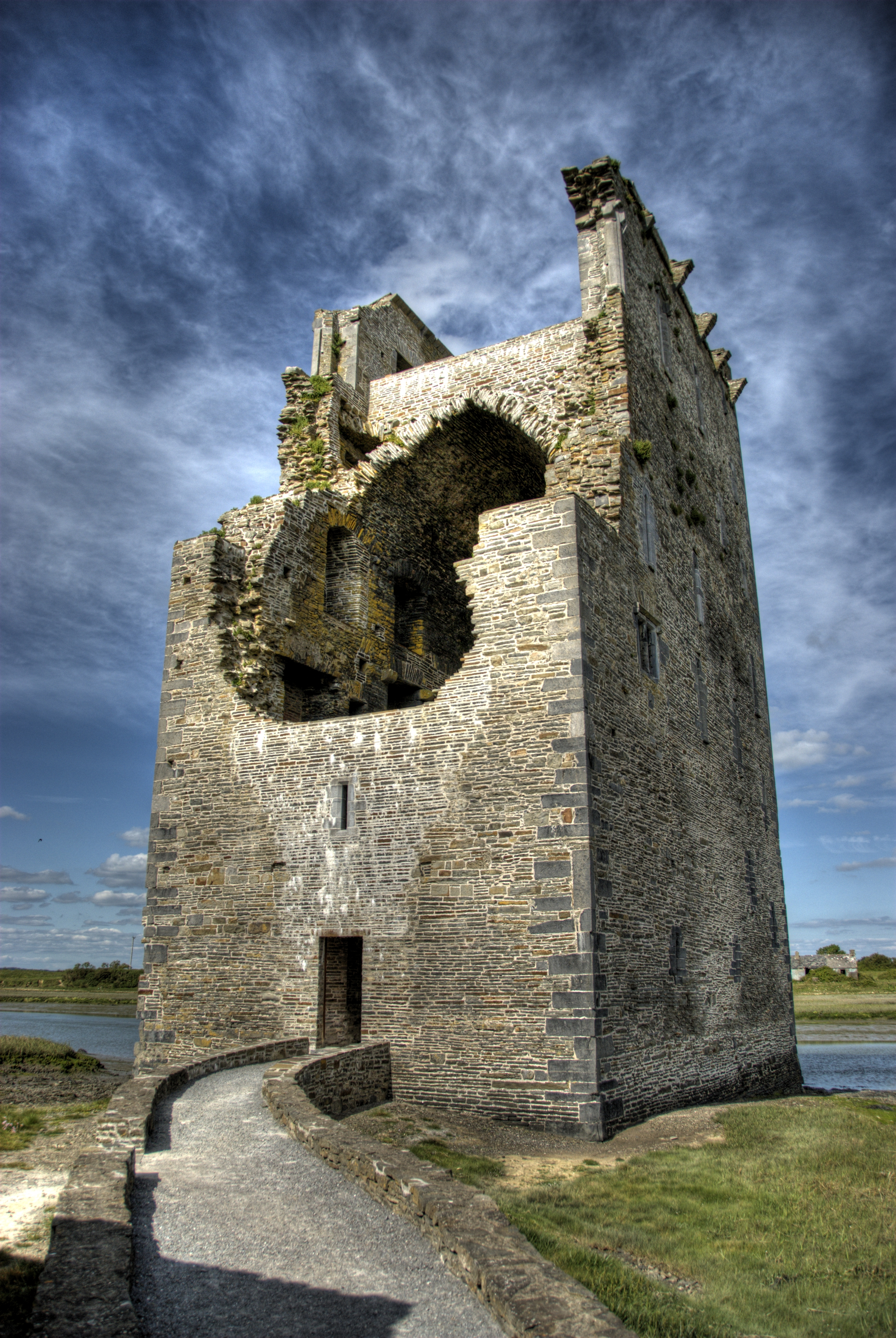
Carrigafoyle Castle

Carrigafoyle Castle was built between 1490 and 1500 by Conchuir Liath Uí Conchuir (Connor Liath O’Connor) using a design borrowed from the Normans. In addition to its windows and archways, it features a spiral staircase of 104 steps that visitors can climb today. The castle, now a listed National Monument, stands 100 feet (almost 30 m) high, and its battlements provide views of the estuary and the monastic Scattery Island in County Clare. The O'Connors of Kerry held political sway from this strategic base, allowing them to "inspect" ships passing to and from the port of Limerick. Thus, "taxation" and smuggling were the main sources of income. The castle was fortified, and the narrow spiral staircase ascended clockwise, thus disadvantaging any attacker.

In 1580, during the Second Desmond Rebellion, the castle was defended by a garrison composed of some 70 Irish, Italian and Spanish troops led by Captain Julian, an Italian. The Siege of Carrigafoyle Castle by Elizabethan forces under Lord Justice Sir William Pelham began on Palm Sunday. After two days, it was breached by cannon fire and taken, following which the surviving defenders were all hanged. The cannon breach remains visible to this day. Towards the end of the Nine Years War, taking advantage of the distraction of the English, Chieftain John O'Connor briefly re-occupied the castle only to be put out again in 1603 by George Carew, the Governor of Munster.

King James I restored the castle to the O'Connors in 1607, but in 1651 during the Cromwellian conquest of Ireland, it was again captured, this time by Cromwellian forces under Edmund Ludlow. Ludlow was Henry Ireton's second in command and, after Ireton's death, commander in chief in Ireland. Ludlow ensured the castle could never again be fortified and garrisoned by knocking the outer defensive walls.

The O'Connor lands were confiscated under the Act for the Settlement of Ireland of 1652 and given to William Sandes of Cumberland, who had arrived in Ireland with Oliver Cromwell in 1649. Following the restoration of the monarchy, the lands were subsequently granted to Trinity College Dublin in 1666. The college remained the principal landlord in the Ballylongford area until the Land Act 1903 was passed. Some land titles are still vested in the college to this day.

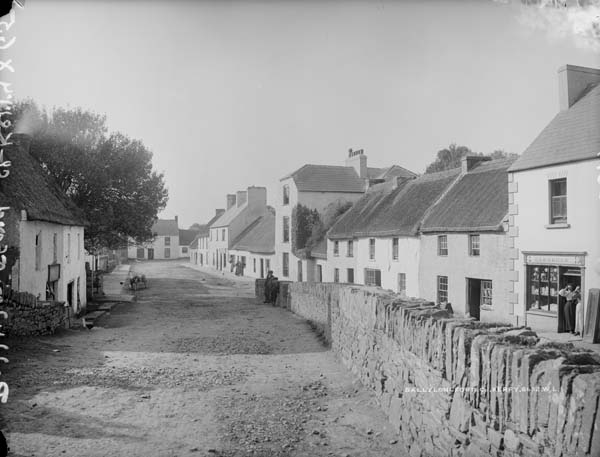
Ballylongford in the late 19th century

On the other side of the creek, the O'Connors built the Friary of Lislaughtin in 1478, known locally as Lislaughtin Abbey (Lios Laichtin, meaning Lachtin's Enclosure). St Lachtin was the first to preach Christianity in the area. Two of the O'Connor chiefs are buried within its walls. English forces raided the abbey twice, coinciding with the military action against Carrigafoyle Castle. The abbey was dissolved in the 17th century. A processional cross, possibly buried by the friars for safekeeping, survived the raids and was later discovered by a farmer. This processional cross, known as Lislaughtin Cross, is now on display in the National Museum in Dublin. Since at least 2012, there has been no space for new graves at Lislaughtin Abbey, and a new graveyard was commissioned at Aghavallen in 2013.

The village in its present form dates from the end of the eighteenth century, though a bridge over the ford existed long before. The old bridge was destroyed by flood in 1926. A reinforced concrete bridge was completed in 1930 and stands to this day. Photographs taken at the turn of the century show the village largely made up of thatched houses, but many of these were burned by the Black and Tans during the War of Independence.

Fort Shannon, a concrete coastal artillery fort, is located six kilometers from the village. Constructed in 1940, it is the only fortified installation built by the Irish Defence Forces during World War II, termed the Emergency in Ireland.

== Economy and amenities ==
Farming, fishing and tourism are key contributors to the local economy. As of August 2018, there were renewed proposals to open a liquefied natural gas terminal in the area.

Ballylongford parish is within the Roman Catholic Diocese of Kerry and is served by the church of St Mary, Asdee, and the church of St Michael the Archangel, Ballylongford. The latter church was built in the 1870s to a Hiberno Romanesque style. A former church in the area, Aghavallin church, on the edge of Ballylongford, dates from the 14th century. Now in ruin, at different times, it served both the Roman Catholic and Church of Ireland adherents of the area before it was closed in 1829, and a new church was built on the opposite side of the road.

== People ==
- Brendan Kennelly, poet and novelist, was born in Ballylongford in 1936, and a festival celebrating his work is held annually.
- Horatio, and later Lord Kitchener, was born in Ballylongford in 1850.
- Father Malachi Martin, a Roman Catholic priest, former Jesuit and author.
- Detective Garda Jerry McCabe of the Garda Síochána was born in Ballylongford. He was killed in 1996 by members of the Provisional IRA during the attempted robbery of a post office in Adare, County Limerick.
- Michael O'Rahilly ("The O'Rahilly"), a member of the Gaelic League and one of the founders of the Irish Volunteers, was born in the village in 1875. Ballylongford's local Gaelic football Club is known as "O'Rahilly's Gaelic Football Club".

== See also ==
- Ballylongford GAA
- List of abbeys and priories in Ireland (County Kerry)
- List of towns and villages in Ireland
