= Lisselton =

Village in County Kerry, Ireland

Lisselton Lios Eiltín
- Village
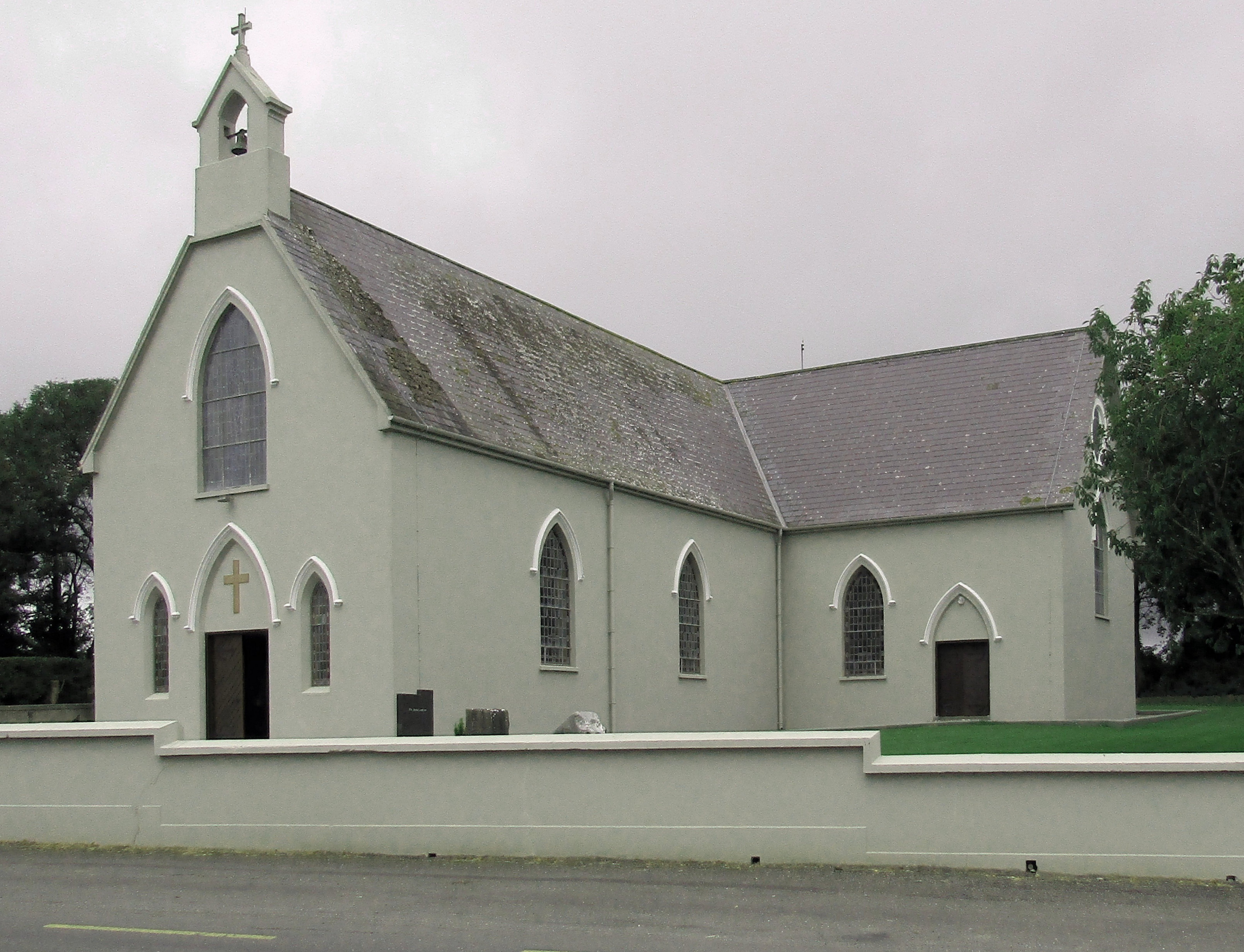
- Saint Teresa's Church

- Location in Ireland
- Coordinates: 52°29′17″N 09°34′35″W
- Country: Ireland
- Province: Munster
- County: County Kerry

Lisselton (Irish: Lios Eiltín, meaning 'ring-fort of Eiltín') is a village in County Kerry, Ireland. It is located 8 km northwest of Listowel on the R553 road to Ballybunion. The village is part of the parish of Ballydonoghue, which is located in the north of the county. The village contains three pubs, several shops and there are two primary schools in the parish.

== Sport ==
The parish Gaelic Athletic Association club is Ballydonoghue GAA club. The club, which has its grounds at Coolard townland, has contributed players on the Kerry inter-county team on a number of occasions. Three members of the club played were members of the 1947 Kerry team that played in the only All Ireland final ever held outside Ireland - the Kerry-Cavan final played in the Polo Grounds in New York.

The local association football (soccer) club, Lisselton Rovers, was previously based in Lisselton and played in the Kerry District League. The club relocated to Ballybunion and renamed themselves LB Rovers in 2012.

== Transport ==
The Lartigue Monorail passed through Lisselton between 1888 and 1924. The village now has a taxi and bus service.

== Education ==
Lisselton National School opened in 1983. The school has approximately 134 students, five class teachers, a learning support teacher, a resource teacher and two special needs assistants. Coolard National School is the second school. Dromerin National School was the third, but it was closed in September 2012 due to dwindling numbers.

== Literature ==
Lisselton was the birthplace of the novelist Maurice Walsh, whose most famous work was The Quiet Man. John B. Keane's family were also from the area and he once remarked that it was a "throbbing vein of literary genius" running through the locality that made it easier to write than not to write.

The Ballydonoghue Parish Magazine was established in the 1980s and each annual edition has articles covering issues of local relevance, including Gaelic games.

== See also ==
- List of towns and villages in Ireland
